= Rip Van Dam =

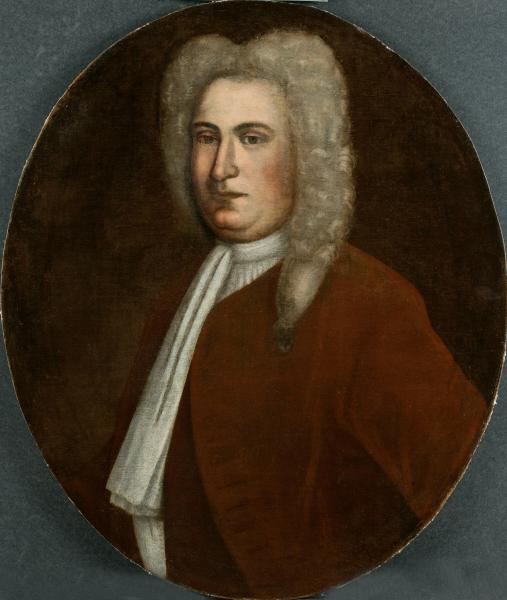
- Portrait from c. 1720

Governor of New York (acting)
- In office 1731–1732
- Monarch: George II
- Preceded by: John Montgomerie
- Succeeded by: William Cosby

Personal details
- Born: c. 1660 Beverwyck, Albany, New York
- Died: 10 June 1749 Manhattan, New York
- Political party: Republican Liberal
- Spouse: Sarah Van Der Spiegle
- Profession: Merchant, colonial administrator

Rip Van Dam (c. 1660 – 10 June 1749) was an American merchant and colonial administrator who served as the acting governor of New York from 1731 to 1732. As one of the leaders of the republican liberal (or "country") party, Van Dam led confrontations against Governor William Cosby.

== Early life ==
Rip Van Dam was born, about 1660, at Beverwyck, Albany, New York, where he was raised. He was the son of Maria Bords and Claes Ripse Van Dam, a middle class local socialite who traded through his carpentry business and operated as a contractor. By him, Van Dam was related to the Dutch Church of Albany.

== Career ==
In Albany, Van Dam was employed since his adolescence by Robert Story, a businessman of Manhattan, New York City, who was trading around. Subsequently, Van Dam was sent to New York, to study business management earnestly, and he became a prominent merchant, running his own business. He invested in the Atlantic slave trade as part of his mercantile career.

During the royal governance of Lord Bellomont, Van Dam resisted his enforcement of the Navigation Acts and Bellomont reacted by confiscating some of Van Dam's vessels, alleging violations of those acts. By such struggle, Van Dam became engaged into politics. In 1699, Van Dam was elected to represent New York City in the Province of New York Assembly in Albany, and he became the opposition leader. In 1715, he and three others hired Thomas Jacobs to take the Anne and Mary to the Gold Coast where Jacobs returned with 38 slaves. That same year, Van Dam, and three other merchants, invested in a second trip under Captain John Browne, which resulted in a return to New York with 43 slaves. In 1723, Van Dam, his son-in-law Walter Thong, and two others sent Alan Jarrett, captaining the Burnet to Africa to obtain slaves and sell them in Jamaica.

=== Councilman of the Royal Governor ===
Van Dam rallied those merchants who had been affected by Bellomont's restrictions and together they issued a complaint to King William III. Effectively, in response, the new royal governor Lord Cornbury removed some councilmen, in 1701, accusing them with promotion of political disorder. Into one of the vacancies of councilman, Van Dam was appointed instead, in 1702. It was uncommon that a native of Albany became a member of the governor's council as it was an office which was usually reserved for prominent noble figures and wealthy New Yorkers. It functioned in New York City.

Van Dam served as a councilman for 30 years. As a councilman's rank was determined by the length of his tenure, eventually Van Dam reached the presidency of the council as the oldest member and, often, he represented the royal governor. For instance, Van Dam travelled annually to Albany, to renew the English-Iroquoian alliance on the governor's behalf.

=== Acting Governor ===
After the royal governor John Montgomerie's death in 1731, Van Dam, who was the council president, was appointed acting governor of New York Province.

=== Against the new Royal Governor ===
By opposing the Molasses act, Van Dam was rewarded, receiving 1,000 pounds by the assembly. Besides, the assembly had disposed a bill through which the liberal institutions of New York got much money. In April 1732, the designated royal governor William Cosby arrived. Disliking such liberal manoeuvres, Cosby decided that Van Dam should restore half of his salary of interim governor. Van Dam durst replying that, before he might comply for such demands, Cosby should return the privilege fortunes, which were being defalcated out of the English treasury for fake provincial expenditures, by Cosby since his appointment. Cosby assumed in August 1732 but Van Dam refused to take his corresponding oath of councilman.

Cosby was enraged by Van Dam's stubbornness so he filed a lawsuit against him to despoil the half of his acting governor salary. Van Dam was processed through a chancery court (with neither a jury nor a faithful following of the law texts) whereas his defence was taken by William Smith and James Alexander. The court of chancery was quite unpopular amongst the New Yorkers. Nonetheless, it was upheld although one of the three Supreme Court judges, the Chief Justice Lewis Morris, voted against it, in 1733, arguing the illegality of such type of chambers of justice. Despite his judicial victory, Cosby reacted so Van Dam was dismissed off the governor council and Morris was ousted. Nonetheless, Morris' liberal party won the elections in that same year, against the royal party.

In 1734, Van Dam's Heads of Articles of Complaint Against governor Cosby was published, at Boston, Massachusetts. Under the appellative of The Morrisites, the liberal party of New York aligned for Van Dam's claims, with his active participation. Oppositely, the royal loyalists, The Court Party, stood with Cosby.

John Peter Zenger's aggressively liberal New York Weekly Journal newspaper, of which Van Dam had been a founder (1733), used the Van Dam case much in its every day crusade of free government. Usually, like the other liberal figures of New York, Van Dam wrote unsigned articles which were published by Zenger. In 1734, Cosby burned piles of the publication, prosecuting Zenger in the historical Zenger's trial of 1735.

=== The Successor ===
Usually, Van Dam was absent, off the regular sessions of the governor's council. By this reason, Van Dam was suspended by Cosby, who issued this secret order during his deathbed. Therefore, Van Dam did not assume the New York governorship after Cosby's decease (1736). Instead, the corresponding councilman George Clarke, who was of the royal party actually, did. Van Dam demanded the office and, when Clarke refused, the two of them called for respective council sessions. Van Dam was supported by the Chief Justice James DeLancey and his adherents were ready to use the weapons to defend Van Dam's claim. Nonetheless, the conflict ended because, from London, several communiques endorsed Clarke's interim governorship.

== Personal life ==
In 1684, Van Dam married Sarah Van Der Spiegle of New York. Together they had:

- Maria Van Dam (b. 1685), who died young
- Sara Van Dam (b. 1686), who married Walter Thong
- Nicolaes Rips Van Dam (b. 1688)
- Maria Rips Van Dam (b. 1690), who married Nicholas Parcell
- Catharina Van Dam (b. 1692)
- Rip Van Dam Jr. (b. 1694) who married Judith Bayard, the daughter of Samuel Bayard and Margaret Van Cortlandt, on 18 September 1719.
- Margareta Van Dam (b. 1695)
- Louwrens Van Dam, (b. 1697)
- Debora Van Dam (b. 1699)
- Richard Van Dam (b. 1700), who married Cornelia Beekman on 1 March 1724
- Jacob Van Dam (b. 1702), a twin
- Rachel Van Dam (b. 1702), a twin
- Isaac Van Dam (b. 1703/4)
- Elizabeth Van Dam (1706–1778), who married John Sybrandt (1701–1734)
- Catharina Van Dam, (b. 1707)

Van Dam died in New York City on 10 June 1749. He had filed his will in 1746 which detailing his own estate extensively.

Government offices
Preceded by John Montgomerie	Governor of the Province of New York (acting); 1731–1732	Succeeded by William Cosby
