= SS Peter Zenger =

Liberty ship of WWII

History

United States
- Name: Peter Zenger
- Namesake: Peter Zenger
- Owner: War Shipping Administration (WSA)
- Operator: A.H. Bull & Co. Inc.
- Ordered: as type (EC2-S-C1) hull, MC hull 1527
- Builder: J.A. Jones Construction, Panama City, Florida
- Cost: $1,852,957
- Yard number: 9
- Way number: 3
- Laid down: 31 March 1943
- Launched: 4 July 1943
- Completed: 31 July 1943
- Identification: Call Signal: KORL
- Fate: Laid up in the National Defense Reserve Fleet, Astoria, Oregon, 11 October 1946; Sold for scrapping, 19 July 1966

General characteristics
- Class & type: Liberty ship; type EC2-S-C1, standard
- Tonnage: 10,865 LT DWT; 7,176 GRT
- Displacement: 3,380 long tons (3,434 t) (light); 14,245 long tons (14,474 t) (max)
- Length: 441 feet 6 inches (135 m) oa; 416 feet (127 m) pp; 427 feet (130 m) lwl
- Beam: 57 feet (17 m)
- Draft: 27 ft 9.25 in (8.4646 m)
- Installed power: 2 × Oil fired 450 °F (232 °C) boilers, operating at 220 psi (1,500 kPa); 2,500 hp (1,900 kW)
- Propulsion: 1 × triple-expansion steam engine, (manufactured by Vulcan Iron Works, Wilkes-Barre, Pennsylvania); 1 × screw propeller
- Speed: 11.5 knots (21.3 km/h; 13.2 mph)
- Capacity: 562,608 cubic feet (15,931 m^{3}) (grain); 499,573 cubic feet (14,146 m^{3}) (bale)
- Complement: 38–62 USMM; 21–40 USNAG
- Armament: Varied by ship; Bow-mounted 3-inch (76 mm)/50-caliber gun; Stern-mounted 4-inch (102 mm)/50-caliber gun; 2–8 × single 20-millimeter (0.79 in) Oerlikon anti-aircraft (AA) cannons and/or, 2–8 × 37-millimeter (1.46 in) M1 AA guns

SS Peter Zenger was a Liberty ship built in the United States during World War II. She was named after John Peter Zenger, a printer and journalist in New York City that printed The New York Weekly Journal. He was accused of libel in 1734, by William Cosby, the governor of New York, but the jury acquitted Zenger, who became a symbol for freedom of the press.

== Construction ==
Peter Zenger was laid down on 31 March 1943, under a United States Maritime Commission (MARCOM) contract, MC hull 1527, by J.A. Jones Construction, Panama City, Florida; she was launched on 4 July 1943.

== History ==
She was allocated to A.H. Bull & Co. Inc., on 31 July 1943. On 11 October 1946, she was laid up in the National Defense Reserve Fleet, in Astoria, Oregon. On 22 July 1954, she was withdrawn from the fleet to be loaded with grain under the "Grain Program 1954", she returned loaded with grain on 4 August 1954. She was withdrawn from the fleet on 20 May 1963, to have the grain unloaded, she returned empty on 25 May 1963. On 19 July 1966, she was sold for $45,355.55 to American Ship Dismantlers, Inc., for scrapping. She was removed from the fleet on 5 August 1966.

== See also ==
- Convoy UGS-40

== Bibliography ==
- "Jones Construction, Panama City FL". ShipbuildingHistory.com. 13 October 2010.
- Maritime Administration. "Peter Zenger". Ship History Database Vessel Status Card. U.S. Department of Transportation, Maritime Administration.
- Davies, James (May 2004). "Specifications (As-Built)" (PDF). p. 23.
- "SS Peter Zenger".
