= George Clinton (Royal Navy officer) =

Royal Navy admiral, governor of the Province of New York

Admiral of the Fleet The Honourable George Clinton
- Born: c. 1686; Stourton Parva, Lincolnshire, England
- Died: 10 July 1761 (aged 74–75)
- Military career
- Allegiance: Kingdom of Great Britain
- Branch: Royal Navy
- Service years: 1708–1761
- Rank: Admiral of the Fleet
- Commands: HMS Speedwell; HMS Monck; HMS Nottingham; HMS Colchester; HMS Sunderland; HMS Namur; HMS Berwick; HMS Expedition; HMS St Michael; Newfoundland Station; Mediterranean Fleet
- Conflicts: War of the Spanish Succession; War of the Austrian Succession

Signature
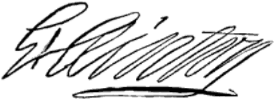

Viceregal styles of George Clinton
- Reference style: His Excellency
- Spoken style: Your Excellency

Admiral of the Fleet George Clinton (c. 1686 – 10 July 1761) was a Royal Navy officer and politician. Benefiting from the patronage of Thomas Pelham-Holles, 1st Duke of Newcastle, he served as a naval captain during the 1720s and 1730s.

Clinton went on to be Governor of the Colony of Newfoundland, Commodore and Commander-in-Chief of the Mediterranean Fleet and then Governor of the Province of New York where he had to deal with the threat of a French attack during King George's War. He could not cope with the liberal politicians of the New York assembly who were led by James De Lancey and resigned in 1753.

Clinton also served as Member of Parliament for Saltash, a rotten borough in Cornwall, from March 1757 until his death in July 1761.

== Early career ==
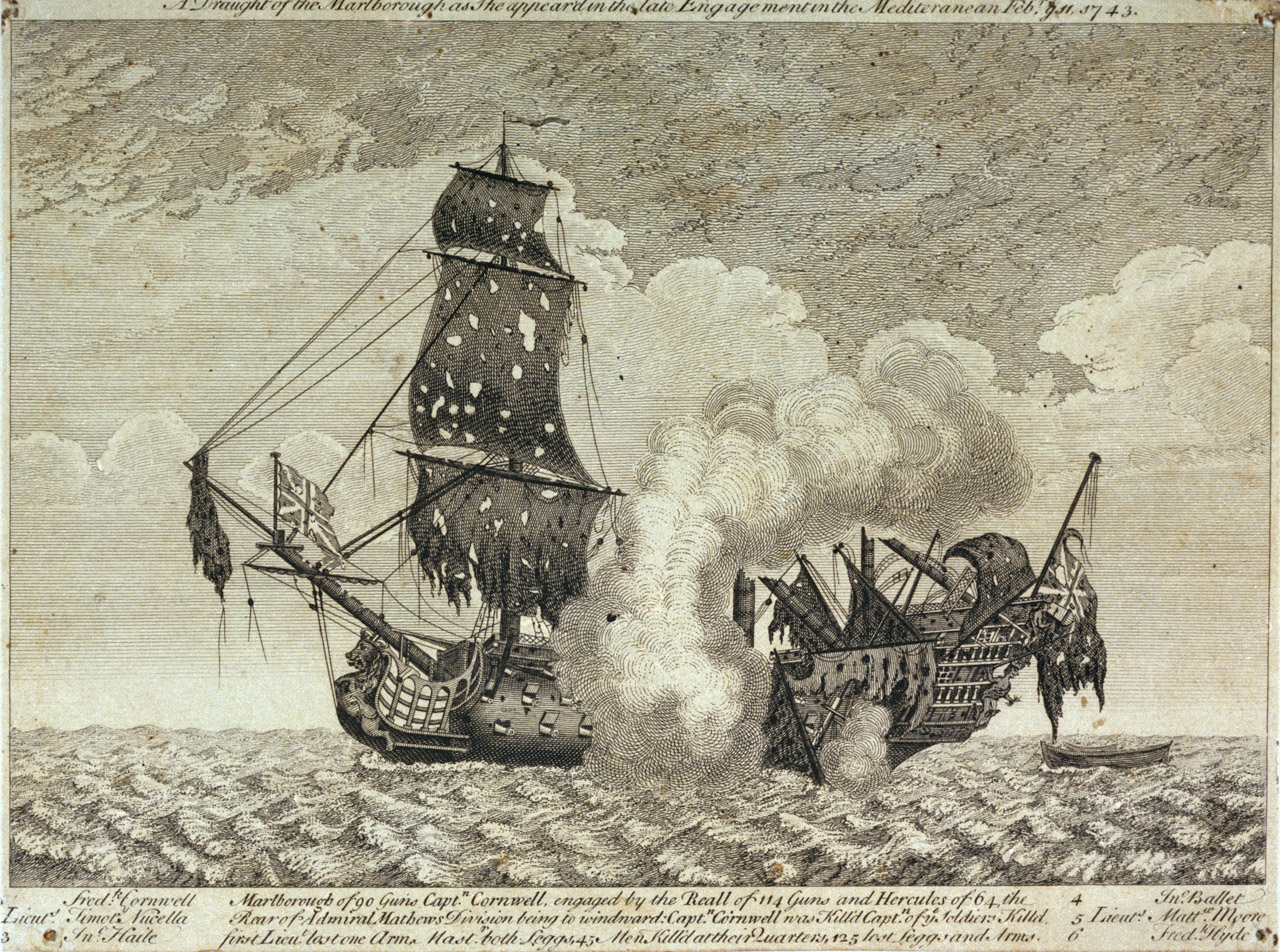
The second-rate HMS St Michael which Clinton commanded during the War of the Austrian Succession

Born the second son of Francis Clinton, 6th Earl of Lincoln, and Susan Clinton (née Penninston), Clinton joined the Royal Navy in 1708 during the War of the Spanish Succession. Clinton enjoyed the patronage of Thomas Pelham-Holles, 1st Duke of Newcastle, who was his sister-in-law's brother, and, having been promoted to captain on 16 June 1716, he was given command of the fifth-rate HMS Speedwell. He transferred to the command of the fourth-rate HMS Monck in 1720 and served in the Baltic Sea under Admiral Sir John Norris: the ship was lost during the return journey to England, but Clinton was acquitted at the subsequent court-martial. He was given command of the fourth-rate HMS Nottingham in 1721 and sailed to the Baltic Sea to carry out patrols before returning home again in 1722.

After four years of inactivity, Clinton was given command of the fourth-rate HMS Colchester in the Mediterranean Sea in 1726 and saw action escorting merchant shipping, attacking Spanish batteries and blockading the Spanish coast before transferred to the command of the fourth-rate HMS Sunderland in July 1727. In 1732, Clinton was appointed commodore of a squadron of ships which was despatched to Newfoundland where he also became governor of the colony. In that role he supervised the newly appointed local magistrates and protected the local fishing industry.

Clinton took command of the second-rate HMS Namur as flag captain to Admiral Sir Charles Wager in June 1732 and then transferred to the command of the third-rate HMS Berwick in the Channel Fleet in 1734. He went on to be Commodore and Commander-in-Chief of the Mediterranean Fleet in 1736 but, with the War of Jenkins' Ear looming, he stepped down to take command of the third-rate HMS Expedition in 1739 and of the second-rate HMS St Michael in 1740 during the War of the Austrian Succession.

== Governor of New York ==
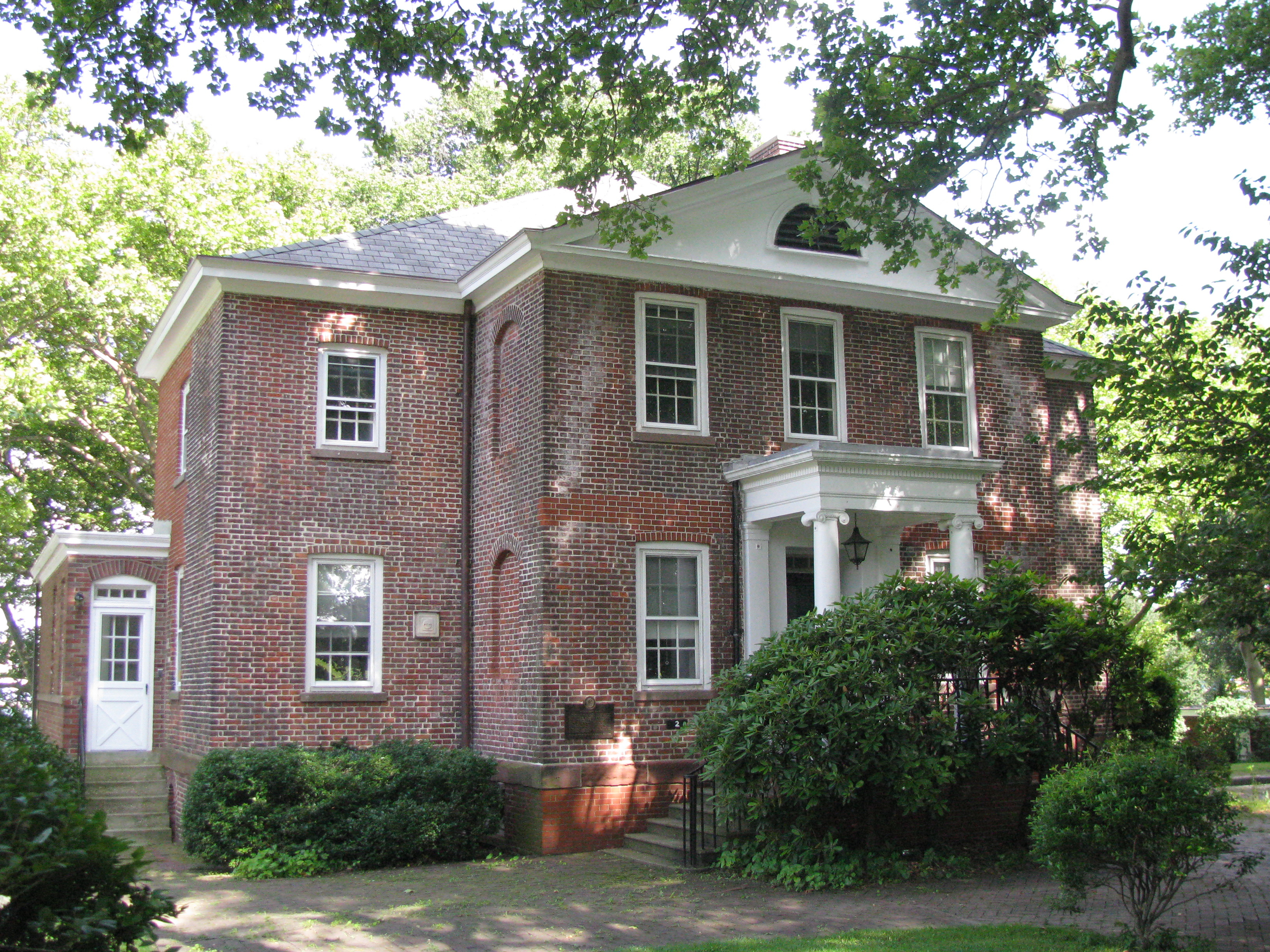
The Governor's House on Governors Island, New York

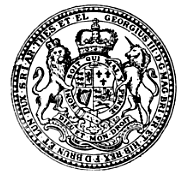
Seal of the Province of New York

Heavily in debt, Clinton lobbied the Duke of Newcastle for profitable employment as an American governor: he was appointed Governor of the Province of New York in July 1741 and arrived in New York in September 1743 to take up his position. Promoted to rear-admiral on 10 December 1743 and vice-admiral on 23 June 1744, he sought to protect New York's northern border from attack by the French: however liberal members of the New York assembly resisted his proposals as they wanted to maintain trade links with the French and with the Native Americans who were under French influence.

James De Lancey, who had initially been his main adviser, turned against him and sought to block the governor's salary. Clinton therefore invited Sir William Johnson to take over responsibility for Native American affairs in 1746 and appointed Cadwallader Colden to be his advisor. Clinton was promoted to full admiral on 15 July 1747. Working with the Mohawk chief Hendrick Theyanoguin, Johnson was able to recruit Mohawk warriors to fight on the side of the British in 1747 during King George's War. After continuing disputes with the assembly over military expenditure and payment of the governor's salary, Clinton resigned as governor in October 1753.

== Later career ==
Clinton was elected member of parliament for Saltash, a rotten borough in Cornwall, in May 1754. Promoted to Admiral of the Fleet in March 1757, he died on 10 July 1761.

== Family ==
Clinton married the heiress, Anne Carle on 19 December 1727, at St James, Westminster, London: their children included General Sir Henry Clinton, who became a British commander in the American Revolutionary War, and Lucy Mary Clinton, who married Admiral Robert Roddam.

Clinton was "a distant relative" of Charles Clinton, patriarch of a line of Clintons later prominent in New York. George Clinton, as Governor of the Province of New York, politically patronized Charles Clinton and Charles Clinton's eponymous son George Clinton, who would later become the first Governor of the State of New York and Vice President of the United States. Another son of Charles Clinton was James Clinton; both James and George served as Revolutionary War generals under George Washington opposite their distant cousin Sir Henry Clinton.

== See also ==
- Governors of Newfoundland
- List of people from Newfoundland and Labrador

== Sources ==
- Heathcote, Tony (2002). The British Admirals of the Fleet 1734–1995. Pen & Sword. p. 44. ISBN 0-85052-835-6.
- Shannon, Timothy J. (2008). Iroquois Diplomacy on the Early American Frontier. New York: Viking. p. 122. ISBN 978-0-670-01897-0.

Parliament of Great Britain
Preceded by Stamp Brooksbank; George Brydges Rodney	Member of Parliament for Saltash; 1754–1761; With: Viscount Duncannon 1754–1756; Charles Townshend 1756–1761	Succeeded by John Clevland and George Adams
Government offices
Preceded by Henry Osborn	Commodore Governor of Newfoundland; 1731–1731	Succeeded by Edward Falkingham
Preceded by George Clarke (acting)	Governor of the Province of New York; 1741–1753	Succeeded by Sir Danvers Osborn
Military offices
Preceded by James Steuart	Admiral of the Fleet; 1757–1761	Succeeded by Lord Anson
