= John Peter Zenger =

Printer, journalist and defender of freedom of the press in early America (1697–1746)

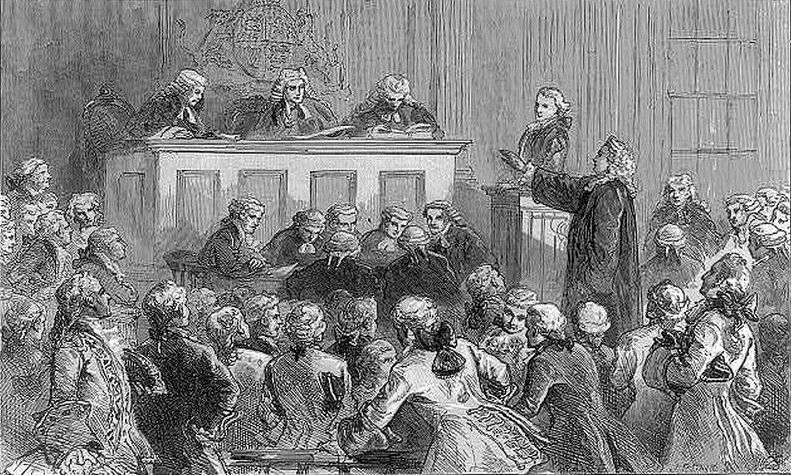
- Andrew Hamilton defending John Peter Zenger in court, 1734–1735
- Born: October 26, 1697; Impflingen, or Rumbach; Rhenish Palatinate
- Died: July 28, 1746 (aged 48); New York, Province of New York
- Citizenship: British
- Occupation: Newspaper writer
- Years active: 1720–1746
- Known for: Zenger trial
- Notable work: The New York Weekly Journal

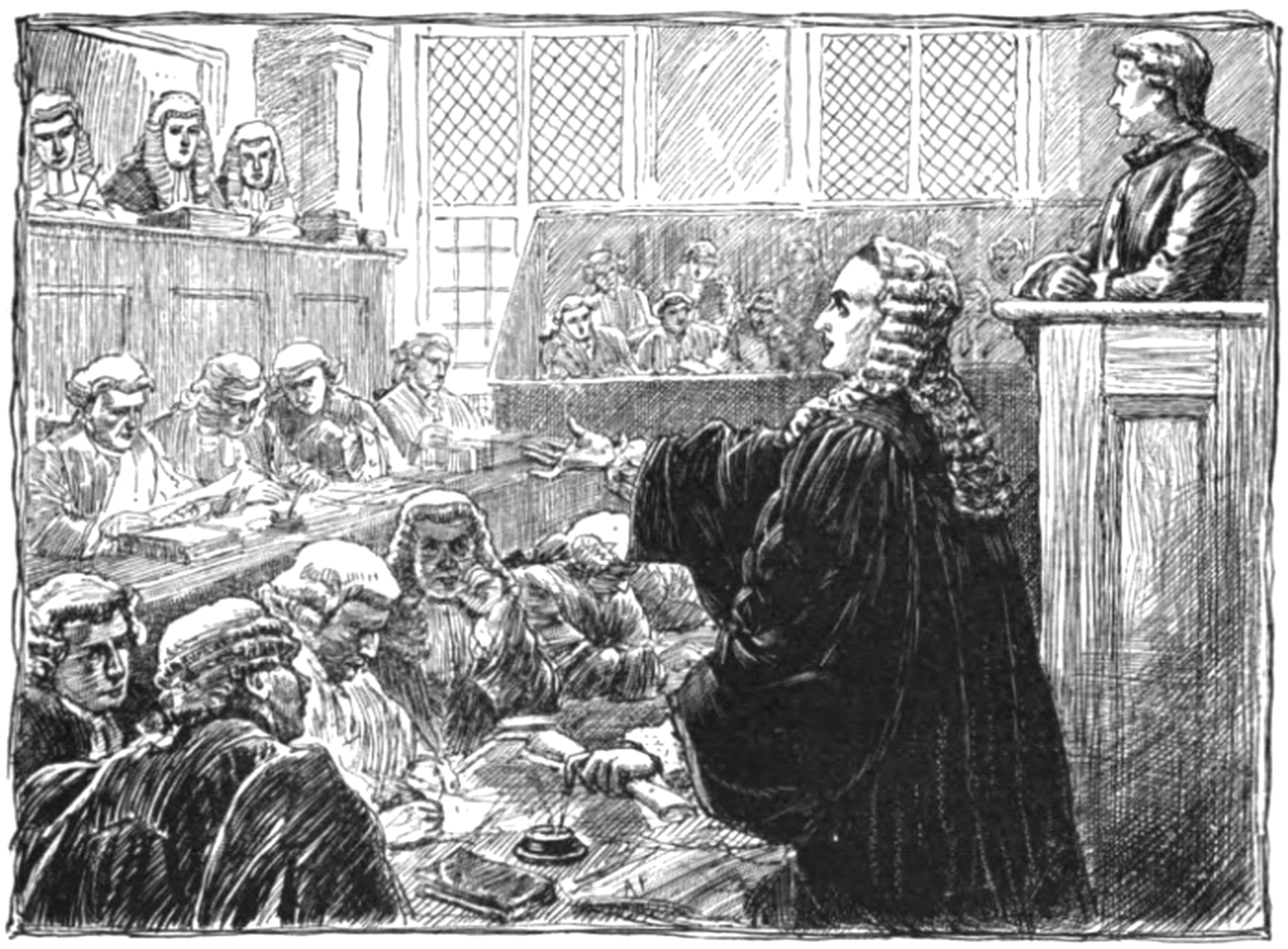
The trial, as imagined by an illustrator in the 1883 book Wall Street in History

John Peter Zenger (October 26, 1697 – July 28, 1746) was a German printer and journalist in New York City. Zenger printed The New York Weekly Journal. He was accused of libel in 1734 by William Cosby, the royal governor of New York, but the jury acquitted Zenger, who became a symbol for freedom of the press.

In 1733, Zenger began printing The New York Weekly Journal, which voiced opinions critical of the colonial governor, William Cosby. On November 17, 1734, on Cosby's orders, the sheriff arrested Zenger. After a grand jury refused to indict him, the Attorney General Richard Bradley charged him with libel in August 1735. Zenger's lawyers, Andrew Hamilton and William Smith, Sr., successfully argued that truth is a defense against charges of libel.

== Early life ==
Peter Zenger was born in 1697 in the German Palatinate. Most of the details of his early life are obscure. He was the son of Nicolaus Eberhard Zenger and his wife Johanna. His father was a school teacher in Impflingen in 1701. The Zenger family had other children baptized in Rumbach in 1697 and in 1703 and in Waldfischbach in 1706. The Zenger family immigrated to New York in 1710 as part of a large group of German Palatines, and Nicolaus Zenger was one of those who died before settlement. The governor of New York had agreed to provide apprenticeships for all the children of immigrants from the Palatinate, and John Peter was bound for eight years as an apprentice to William Bradford, the first printer in New York. By 1720, he was taking on printing work in Maryland, though he returned to New York permanently by 1722.

When in 1725 William Bradford began publishing the New York Gazette, the first and only newspaper in New York at the time, John Peter Zenger was directly responsible for its production and also became a partner in Bradford's business.

After a brief partnership with Bradford in 1725, Zenger set up as a commercial printer on Smith Street in New York City. In 1730, Zenger published Peter Venema's Arithmetica, considered the first arithmetic text printed in New York. By 1731, his printing house on Smith Street had released 21 titles, while his main competitor and former employer, Bradford, had printed 50.

On 28 May 1719, Zenger married Mary White in the First Presbyterian Church, Philadelphia. On 24 August 1722, widower Zenger married Anna Catharina Maul in the Collegiate Church, New York. He was the father of many children by his second wife, six of whom survived.

== Libel case ==
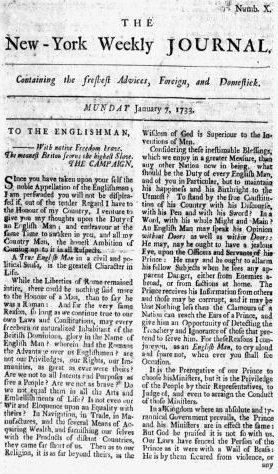
A page from Zenger's New-York Weekly Journal, 7 January 1733

In 1733, Zenger was hired by New York politicians, Rip Van Dam and Lewis Morris, to print a newspaper, The New-York Weekly Journal, opposing the actions of the newly appointed colonial governor, William Cosby. On his arrival in New York City, Cosby had plunged into a rancorous quarrel with the colony council over his salary, trying to recoup half of the salary of the previous acting governor, Rip Van Dam. Unable to control the colony's Supreme Court, which had ruled against Cosby in the dispute, Cosby removed Chief Justice Lewis Morris, replacing him with the royalist justice James DeLancey.

The first issue of Zenger's New-York Weekly Journal carried a lengthy report on the election for an open seat in the New York General Assembly, held in Eastchester on October 29, 1733; the election was won by Lewis Morris over Cosby's candidate. Zenger's newspaper continued to publish articles critical of the royal governor. Finally, Cosby issued a proclamation condemning the newspaper's "divers scandalous, virulent, false and seditious reflections," and Zenger was charged with libel.

James Alexander was Zenger's first counsel, but the court found him in contempt and disbarred him, removing him from the case. After more than eight months in prison, Zenger went to trial, defended by the Philadelphia lawyer Andrew Hamilton and the New York lawyer William Smith, Sr. The case was now a cause célèbre, with the public interest at fever-pitch. Rebuffed repeatedly by chief justice James DeLancey during the trial, Hamilton decided to plead his client's case directly to the jury. After the lawyers for both sides finished their arguments on August 5, 1735, the jury retired only to return in ten minutes with a verdict of not guilty, a famous example of jury nullification.

In defending Zenger in this landmark case, Hamilton and Smith attempted to establish the precedent that a statement, even if defamatory, is not libelous if it can be proved, thus affirming freedom of the press in America; however, succeeding royal governors clamped down on freedom of the press until the American Revolution. This case is the groundwork of freedom of the press, not its legal precedent. As late as 1804, the journalist Harry Croswell lost a series of prosecutions and appeals because truth was not a defense against libel, as decided by the New York Supreme Court in People v. Croswell. It was only the following year that the assembly, reacting to this verdict, passed a law that allowed truth as a defense against a charge of libel.

=== "Cato" article ===
In the February 25, 1733 issue of The New York Weekly Journal an opinion piece was written under the pseudonym "Cato." This was a pen-name used by British writers John Trenchard and Thomas Gordon, whose essays were published as Cato's Letters (1723). Jeffery A. Smith writes that "Cato" was "The leading luminary of the 18th century libertarian press theory...Editions of Cato's Letters were published and republished for decades in Britain and were immensely popular in America." This article gave its readers a preview of the same argument attorneys Hamilton and Smith presented 18 months later in the government's libel case against Zenger – that truth is an absolute defense against libel. The words are reprinted from Cato's essay "Reflections Upon Libelling":

A libel is not less the libel for being true...But this doctrine only holds true as to private and personal failings; and it is quite otherwise when the crimes of men come to affect the publick…Machiavel says, Calumny is pernicious, but accusation beneficial, to a state; and he shews instances where states have suffered or perished for not having, or for neglecting, the power to accuse great men who were criminals, or thought to be so…surely it cannot be more pernicious to calumniate even good men, than not to be able to accuse ill ones.

== Death ==
Zenger died in New York on July 28, 1746, at the age of 48 years old with his wife continuing his printing business.

== Legacy and honors ==
During World War II, the Liberty ship SS Peter Zenger was named in his honor.

Zenger was a Madison, Wisconsin, based underground newspaper that operated during the late 20th century.

Zenger News is a wire service owned and operated by journalists.

A ten foot high limestone statue of John Peter Zenger is mounted on the brick wall of P.S. 18 in the Bronx in New York City. The sculpture was created by sculptor Joseph Kiselewski.

== See also ==
- Early American publishers and printers
- Areopagitica
- Federal Hall
- Freedom of the press
- Freedom of speech in the United States
- People v. Croswell
- Saint Paul's Church National Historic Site
- The New York Weekly Journal

== Bibliography ==
- Burrows, E. G.; Wellace, M. (1998). "Chapter 11: Recession, Revival, and Rebellion". Gotham: A History of New York City to 1898. Oxford University Press. ISBN 978-0-19-511634-2.
- Copeland, David. "The Zenger Trial." Media Studies Journal 14#2 (2000): 2–7.
- Covert, Cathy. "'Passion Is Ye Prevailing Motive': The Feud Behind the Zenger Case." Journalism & Mass Communication Quarterly (1973) 50#1 pp: 3–10.
- Eldridge, Larry D. "Before Zenger: Truth and Seditious Speech in Colonial America, 1607–1700." American Journal of Legal History (1995): 337-358. in JSTOR
- Lawson, John Davidson (1914). American state trials. Vol. XVI. St. Louis : Thomas Law Books.
- Levy, Leonard W. (January 1960). "Did the Zenger Case Really Matter? Freedom of the Press in Colonial New York". The William and Mary Quarterly. 17 (1). Omohundro Institute of Early American History and Culture: 35–50. doi:10.2307/1943478. JSTOR 1943478.
- Levy, Leonard Williams, ed. Freedom of the press from Zenger to Jefferson: early American libertarian theories (Irvington Publishers, 1966)
- Olsen, Alison (2000). "The Zenger Case Revisited: Satire, Sedition and Political Debate in Eighteenth Century America". Early American Literature. 35 (3). University of Maryland: 223–245. doi:10.1353/eal.2000.0009. S2CID 153329184.
- Pasley, Jeffrey L. (2003). "The tyranny of printers": newspaper politics in the early American republic. Charlottesville; London : University Press of Virginia. ISBN 978-0-8139-21891.

== Primary sources ==
- John Peter Zenger; his press, his trial, and a bibliography of Zenger imprints ... also a reprint of the first edition of the trial by Livingston Rutherfurd, New York : Dodd, Mead & company, 1904
- The tryal of John Peter Zenger, of New-York, printer, who was lately try'd and acquitted for printing and publishing a libel against the government: with the pleadings and arguments on both sides London : Printed for J. Wilford 1738
