= New-York Gazette =

American newspaper

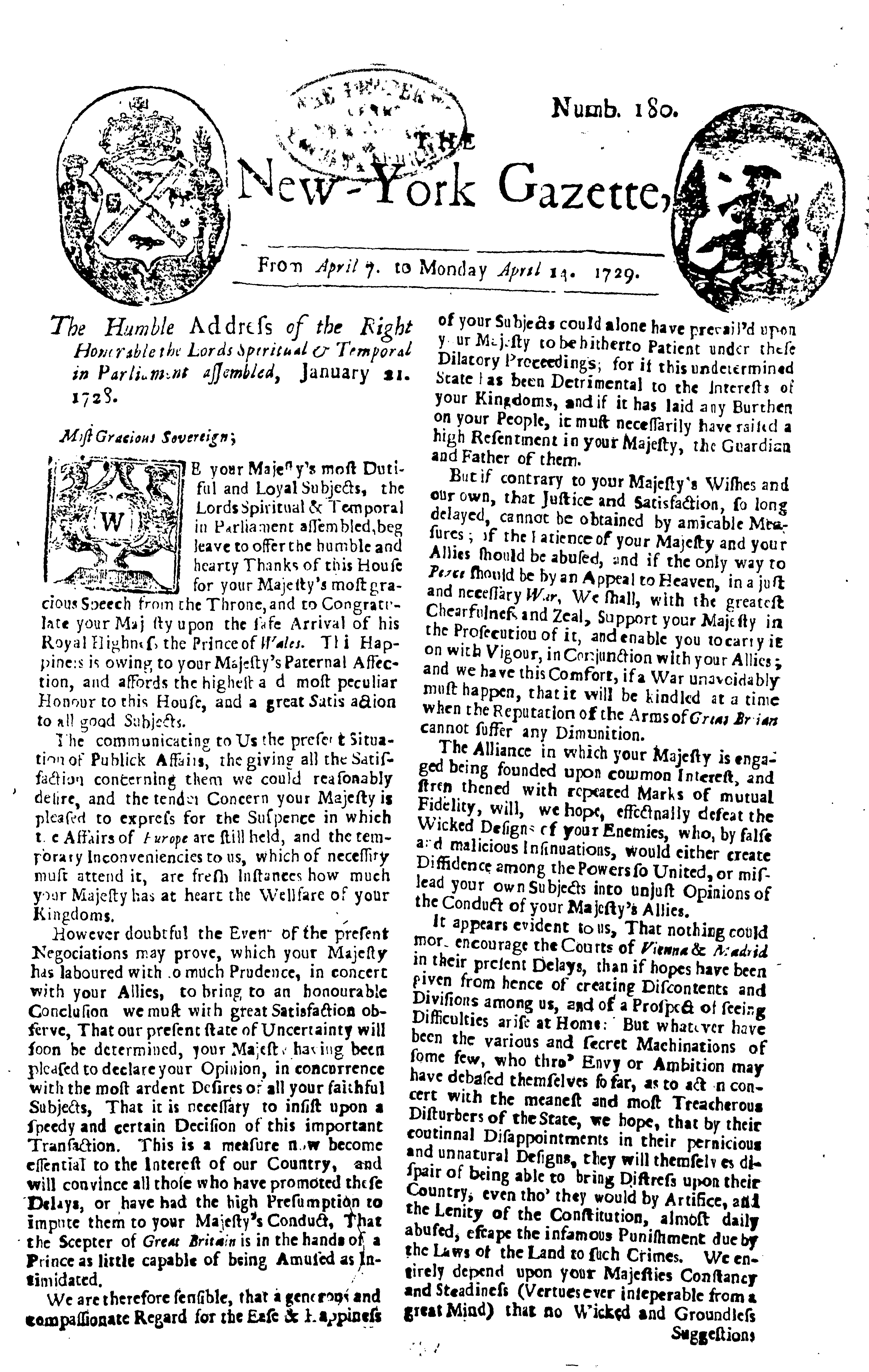
- Front page of the New-York Gazette issue for April 7–14, 1729.
- Type: Weekly newspaper
- Publisher: William Bradford
- Founded: November 8, 1725
- Ceased publication: November 19, 1744 (continued as New-York Evening Post)
- Headquarters: Manhattan, Province of New York, British America
- OCLC number: 1695482

The New-York Gazette (1725–1744) was the first newspaper published by William Bradford in the Province of New York.

== History ==
The newspaper was founded by printer William Bradford in 1725. Though it was first, it was not distinguished. Historian Frank Luther Mott has described the paper as a "small two-page paper, poorly printed, and containing chiefly foreign news from three to six months old, state papers, lists of ships entered and cleared, and a few advertisements."

Bradford had been a printer in Philadelphia, and he was induced to move to New York in 1693 to become the public printer. He was in his 60s when he first issued the weekly Gazette in early November 1725, and he supported the provincial governor William Cosby upon which his livelihood depended.

Public discontent with some of Cosby's actions, which the Gazette did not cover, led to the founding of a second newspaper in 1733, The New York Weekly Journal. The printer of that paper was Bradford's former apprentice John Peter Zenger, who the governor sued for libel, but was acquitted at trial. This was a critical incident in the development of the American conception of the freedom of the press. Bradford remained neutral over the case, and defended himself in a statement in the Gazette in 1736, though acknowledging that he had felt compelled at times to print observations favorable to the Governor, which had caused anger from Zenger and others.

Subscriptions to the paper do not seem to have been plentiful. In the June 17, 1728 issue, Bradford appealed for more subscribers, and for delinquent accounts to pay up, reporting that he had lost 35 pounds on the paper in the two and half-years since starting the venture.

The New-York Gazette was printed on paper produced in the paper mill of William Rittenhouse, the first paper mill established in the Thirteen Colonies, which has the Rittenhouse watermarks.

Over its history the paper varied in length, rising from an initial two pages to four pages, and occasionally running as high as six pages. The Gazette ceased publication November 1744 upon Bradford's retirement.

Henry De Forest had been co-publishing the paper in its later years with Bradford, and he continued a paper under the title New-York Evening Post, which likely lasted until late 1752 or early 1753, and is unrelated to the current New York Post, founded in 1801.

== Other Gazettes ==
After De Forest dropped the Gazette title, others took it on, though without any official connection. This can cause confusion in newspaper bibliographies. The first to take the name was James Parker, another former Bradford apprentice, although he had fled his indenture early. In 1743 he had founded the Weekly Post Boy with backing from Benjamin Franklin, to compete with Bradford.

In 1747, he renamed his paper The New-York Gazette, revived in the Weekly Post-Boy. William Weyman joined Parker as a partner in 1753.

== See also ==
- Early American publishers and printers
