= John Montgomerie =

British military officer, colonial governor of New York and New Jersey (1680–1731)

5th Royal Governor of New Jersey
- In office 1 April 1728 – 1 July 1731
- Monarch: George II
- Preceded by: William Burnet
- Succeeded by: Lewis Morris, President of Council

22nd Colonial Governor of New York
- In office 1728–1731
- Monarch: George II
- Preceded by: William Burnet
- Succeeded by: Rip Van Dam

Personal details
- Born: unknown Beith, Scotland
- Died: 1 July 1731 New York City
- Occupation: Colonial administrator
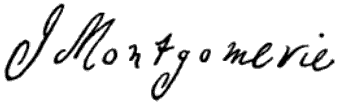
- Signature

Colonel John Montgomerie (died 1731) was colonial governor of New York and New Jersey from 1728 to 1731.

== Life ==
Montgomerie was born in the parish of Beith in Scotland. His father, Francis Montgomerie, was a member of the Privy Council under William III and Mary II and Queen Anne, and lord of Castle Giffen in Beith. When John Montgomerie married, his father gave him the estate at Hessilhead, which was auctioned off in 1722 to pay off accumulated debts.

Montgomerie served in the 3rd Foot Guards, and was elected to Parliament for Ayrshire between 1710 and 1722. When George II ascended the throne in 1727 he rewarded Montgomerie for his service with the governorship of New York and New Jersey, a position Montgomerie may have sought on account of his financial difficulties.

During Montgomerie's term in New York he presided over the issuance of what became known as the Montgomerie Charter for New York City. This served as the city's governing charter for more than a century, even though it was never formally approved by the crown. The city appropriated a sum of £1,000 at the times which may have served as a bribe to various colonial officials, including Montgomerie. His tenure in office saw the city's export exceed those of Boston and Philadelphia, which had until then been the major trade centers in the North American colonies. He also oversaw the final agreement of the borders between New York and the neighboring Connecticut Colony.

Montgomerie served as governor until 1 July 1731, when he died of an epileptic seizure. He was replaced on an acting basis by Rip Van Dam in New York and Lewis Morris in New Jersey, who served until his official replacement, William Cosby, arrived to assume the office.

== See also ==
- List of colonial governors of New Jersey
- List of colonial governors of New York

== Notes ==
Political offices
Parliament of Great Britain
Preceded by Francis Montgomerie	Member of Parliament for Ayrshire; 1710–1722	Succeeded by James Campbell
Government offices
Preceded by William Burnet	Governor of the Province of New York; 1728–1731	Succeeded by Rip Van Dam (acting)
Preceded by William Burnet	Governor of the Province of New Jersey; 1728–1731	Succeeded by Lewis Morris (acting)
