= John Nanfan =

Politician

Coat of Arms of John Nanfan

Approximate area deeded by the Iroquois in the Nanfan Treaty

John Nanfan (1634–1716) was a Lieutenant Governor of the Province of New York from 1698 to 1702. He served as acting governor for about a year between the death of the Earl of Bellomont and the arrival of Bellomont's successor, Lord Cornbury. During the Glorious Revolution in 1688 he served as a captain in William of Orange's invasion army with Bellomont, who was his uncle by marriage.

Nanfan was born in Birtsmorton, Worcestershire, joined the British Army, rising to rank of captain.

While Nanfan was acting as governor of New York in 1701, he made a peace treaty with the Iroquois. According to the text, the Five Nations formally deeded what they considered to be their western lands, extending from present-day western New York to Chicago, Illinois, to King William of England. The Five Nations had conquered much of this area in the 1670s with firearms during the later Beaver Wars, although in fact by 1701, had already lost effective control of most of it again to Algonquian tribes assisted by the French, who then had the strongest actual military presence in the region. Despite this Iroquois sale of all the lands they had recently lost, the English made no practical attempt to settle them, although the treaty was later used in conflicts with the French to assert British sovereignty in them.

Nanfan married a woman from Barbados. Upon the arrival of Lord Cornbury in 1702, Nanfan's political enemies had him arrested for alleged malfeasance in office. He was ordered released by the king after a year and a half in prison, after which he managed to again evade arrest and make his way to England by 1705 and died in Greenwich in 1716.

Government offices
Preceded by Earl of Bellomont	Governor of the Province of New York (acting); 1701–1702	Succeeded by Viscount Cornbury
