= Godfridius Dellius =

Dutch missionary (1654–1738)

- Born: Cothen, Netherlands
- Baptised: 28 October 1654
- Died: 1738
- Occupation: clergyman

Godefridus Dellius (baptized 28 October 1654 – 1738) was a clergyman of the Dutch Reformed Church active in and around Albany, New York during the late 17th century and up to 1699. He also served as a missionary to the Mohawk people in what the English claimed as the Province of New York (the former New Netherland).

Dellius became involved in provincial politics in Albany and opposed Jacob Leisler in 1689, who had usurped power in New York. For a time he had to flee New York to other colonies but was recalled to Albany in 1691 by a new governor. After England and France had made peace, Dellius was delegated with a party to take the news to New France, while escorting the return of nineteen French prisoners. In the exchange, he accompanied English colonists back to Albany. Dellius' work in New York ended in disgrace after Indians complained of being forced to convey a large piece of land near Albany to him and other prominent men in the city; the governor gained approval of a bill to vacate the conveyance. Dellius went to England in his defense in 1699, then he returned to the Netherlands, where he served in Antwerp and Halsteren before his death.

== Biography ==
Godefridus Dellius was the son of a preacher, Godefridus Dellius Sr (ca. 1613–1687), and his wife in a small town near Wijk bij Duurstede. His older brothers Johannes (1651–1691) and Cornelis (1652–1740) also became clergymen. The family's name may be a Latinized version of "van Dellen". He entered Leyden University in 1672 to study philosophy. Dellius was licensed by the classis of Wijk bij Duurstede about 1680 and ordained by the classis of Amsterdam in 1682.

He became involved in provincial politics and opposed Jacob Leisler in 1689, who had usurped power in New York. For a time Dellius had to flee New York to other colonies but was recalled to Albany by a new governor in 1691. After England and France had made peace, he was delegated with a party to take the news to New France, while escorting the return of nineteen French prisoners. In the exchange, he accompanied English colonists out of New France back to Albany. His work in New York ended in disgrace after Indians complained of being forced to convey a large plot of land to him and other prominent men in Albany; the governor gained approval of a bill to vacate the conveyance. Dellius went to England in his defense in 1699, then he moved to Europe for the remainder of his life, serving in the Netherlands.

=== To the New World ===
On April 10, 1683, Dellius married Isabella de Ridder in Cothen, and they emigrated to North America the same year. They settled at Albany, where he served as assistant to Gideon Schaats, pastor of the Reformed Church there. He also preached to ethnic Dutch at Schenectady, about 30 miles west of Albany. He continued in this service about sixteen years.

In common with all the Reform clergy, Dellius refused to recognize Jacob Leisler's usurpation of power in 1689. The latter charged Dellius with being a principal actor in the French and English tensions during King William's War, which played out in the colonies. Leisler said that Dellius was an enemy to the William III, Prince of Orange, who had succeeded King James II. Dellius was commanded to appear in New York City to answer Leisler's accusations, but he hid in New Jersey and Long Island. Later he fled to Boston. He wrote to England describing his perception of Leisler's character.

After the execution of Leisler in May 1691, Gov. Sloughter recalled Dellius, who was on the point of embarking for Europe. He returned to Albany. The government paid Dellius £60 for teaching Indians, primarily Mohawk whose territory was west of Albany. In 1693 he had three Indian boys boarding with him. He greatly restrained the Mohawk from practicing their ritual torture of French prisoners taken in warfare.

On the conclusion of peace between England and France, Dellius and Peter Schuyler were sent as agents, in April 1698, to Count de Frontenac, in Canada, to announce the peace, and bring to an end the provincial hostilities. Acting under the authority of Governor Bellomont, they took nineteen French prisoners to Canada, and obtained the exchange of English colonists held as prisoners by the French.

Soon after Dellius' return from this mission, two Christian Indians declared on oath that Dellius, Peter Schuyler, Evert Bancker, and Dirck Wessels had, in 1696, fraudulently obtained a deed for a large tract of land from the Indians. This land, the deed of which was confirmed by Governor Benjamin Fletcher, was on the eastern side of the Hudson, north of Albany, and was seventy miles in length and twelve in breadth. Dellius also obtained a large tract of land in the valley of the Mohawk, fifty miles by four.

In an interview, the Indians told Bellomont the details of how the deed was conveyed. In the spring of 1699, the governor secured a bill from the colonial legislature to vacate the lands, and also a vote to suspend Dellius from ministerial duty in Albany county. The classis of Amsterdam, Netherlands, complained to the bishop of London about Bellomont's action. Albany and New York contributed £700 to enable Dellius to go to England in order to defend himself against the vacating bill before it received the king's signature. The Indians who had sworn against him afterward took counter-oaths, and, just before his departure, asked Dellius to forgive them. But, they were his converts, and he was known to have great power over them, so their recanting of their statement was not accepted. His deed was vacated.

Dellius remained in Europe. From 1700 he preached in Antwerp; in 1705 he moved to Halsteren. At his death in 1738, his brother Cornelius inherited his accumulated wealth.

Cornelis used it to start a trust fund for the poor. This fund still exists under the name Stichting Boedel Dellius; it helps support an orphanage in Culemborg.
