= Samuel Allen (New Hampshire governor) =

American pioneer, politician (1636–1705)

Samuel Allen (1635–1705) was an English proprietor and governor of the Province of New Hampshire. Born in London, he was a successful merchant, who in 1691 purchased the proprietary claims of the heirs of the colony's founder, John Mason. He was commissioned governor of the province in 1692 by William III and Mary II, a post he held until 1699. He upset local landowners and the colonial bureaucracy in London with his pursuit of territorial claims, which were largely unsuccessful. He died in 1705, before his claims had been resolved.

Allenstown, New Hampshire is named in his memory.

Government offices
Preceded by Simon Bradstreet as Governor of Massachusetts Bay Colony	Governor of the Province of New Hampshire; 1692-1700	Succeeded by Earl of Bellomont
