= Rumbach =

- Municipality
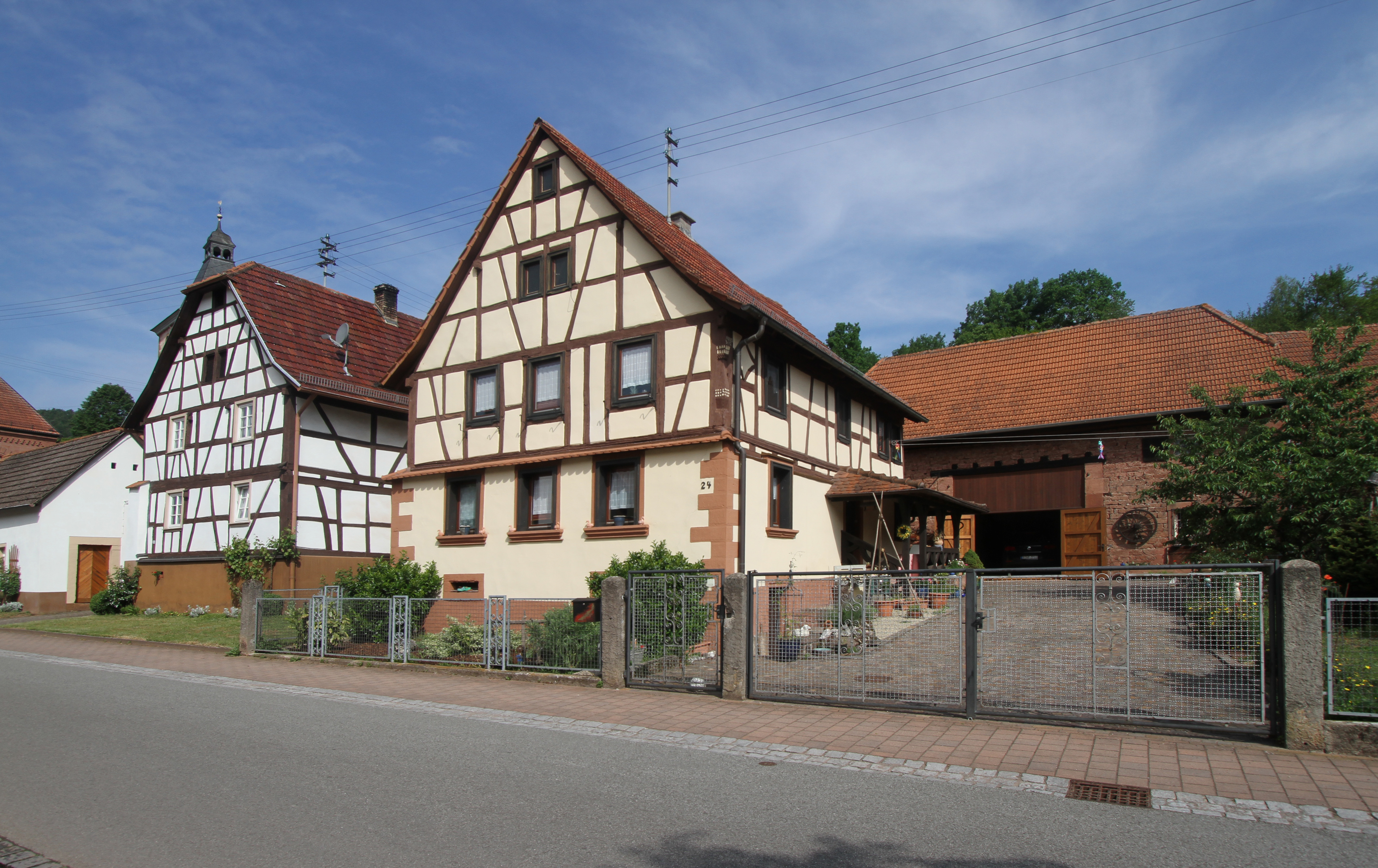

- Coat of arms

- Location of Rumbach within Südwestpfalz district
- Interactive map of Rumbach
- Location within Germany Location within Rhineland-Palatinate
- Coordinates: 49°5′45″N 7°47′14″E
- Country: Germany
- State: Rhineland-Palatinate
- District: Südwestpfalz
- Municipal assoc.: Dahner Felsenland

Government
  - Mayor (2019–24): Ralf Weber

Area
  - Total: 14.79 km^{2} (5.71 sq mi)
- Elevation: 233 m (764 ft)

Population (2025-12-31)
  - Total: 384
  - Density: 26.0/km^{2} (67.2/sq mi)
- Time zone: UTC+01:00 (CET)
  - Summer (DST): UTC+02:00 (CEST)
- Postal codes: 76891
- Dialling codes: 06394
- Vehicle registration: PS
- Website: www.rumbach-pfalz.de

Rumbach is a municipality in Südwestpfalz district, in Rhineland-Palatinate, western Germany.

== Notable people ==
- John Peter Zenger (1697–1746), German printer
