= Impflingen =

- Municipality
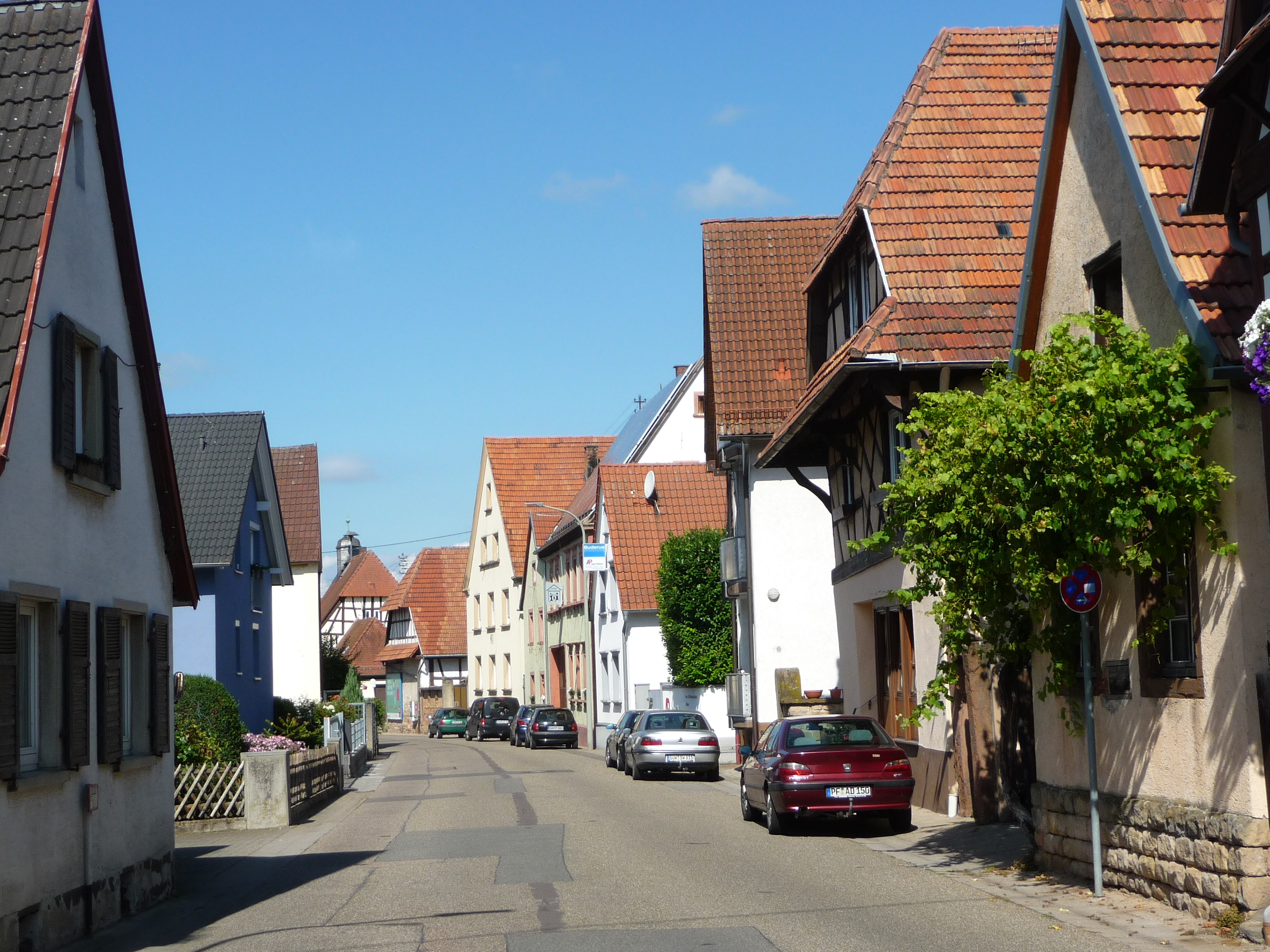

- Coat of arms

- Location of Impflingen within Südliche Weinstraße district
- Interactive map of Impflingen
- Location within Germany Location within Rhineland-Palatinate
- Coordinates: 49°09′51″N 8°06′51″E
- Country: Germany
- State: Rhineland-Palatinate
- District: Südliche Weinstraße
- Municipal assoc.: Landau-Land

Government
  - Mayor (2019–24): Holger Kurz (FW)

Area
  - Total: 5.18 km^{2} (2.00 sq mi)
- Elevation: 157 m (515 ft)

Population (2025-12-31)
  - Total: 1,015
  - Density: 196/km^{2} (507/sq mi)
- Time zone: UTC+01:00 (CET)
  - Summer (DST): UTC+02:00 (CEST)
- Postal codes: 76831
- Dialling codes: 06341
- Vehicle registration: SÜW
- Website: www.impflingen.de

Impflingen (German pronunciation: [ˈɪmpflɪŋən]) is a municipality in Südliche Weinstraße district, in Rhineland-Palatinate, western Germany.
