= Nanfan Treaty =

1701 land cession by the Haudenosaunee Confederacy to the British Crown

Deed from the Five Nations to the King, of their Beaver Hunting Ground
- Map showing the approximate range of the "Beaver Hunting Grounds" described in the Nanfan Treaty.
- Signed: July 19, 1701
- Location: Albany, New York
- Amendment: September 14, 1726
- Parties: Haudenosaunee; Kingdom of England

Full text
- Nanfan Treaty at Wikisource

Deed from the Five Nations to the King, of their Beaver Hunting Ground, more commonly known as the Nanfan Treaty, was an agreement made between representatives of the Haudenosaunee Confederacy with John Nanfan, the acting colonial governor of New York, on behalf of The Crown. The treaty was conducted in Albany, New York, on July 19, 1701, and amended by both parties on September 14, 1726.

The Five Nations (which became the 'Six Nations' after 1720) granted "after mature deliberation out of a deep sense of the many Royal favours extended to us by the present great Monarch of England King William the Third" the title to a vast area of land, covering significant portions of the present-day Midwestern United States and southern Ontario that they had claimed as a hunting ground, as far west as 'Quadoge' (now Chicago), by right of conquest during the later Beaver Wars of the 17th century.

As the vast majority of the Beaver Hunting Grounds described in the Nanfan Treaty were also claimed by New France or its Algonquian Indian allies, the French did not recognize the treaty (they did, however, recognize the suzerainty of the British crown over the Haudenosaunee in the 1713 Treaty of Utrecht) and the English made no real attempt to settle these parts for the time being. In the amended agreement 25 years later, the strip of land 60 miles wide adjoining Lakes Erie and Ontario, starting at Sandusky Creek, was reserved for continued Six Nations occupation and use, with the permission of its owner under the 1701 agreement, the King of Great Britain.

A copy of the treaty, containing the totem images of more than a dozen Haudenosaunee chiefs, is part of the collections of the British National Archives.

== See also ==
- Ohio Country

== Other sources ==
- "Deed from the Five Nations to the King, of their Beaver Hunting Ground," in A Century of Lawmaking for a New Nation: U.S. Congressional Documents and Debates, 1774–1875
- Copy of the Nanfan Treaty
