= William Cosby =

British Army officer and colonial administrator

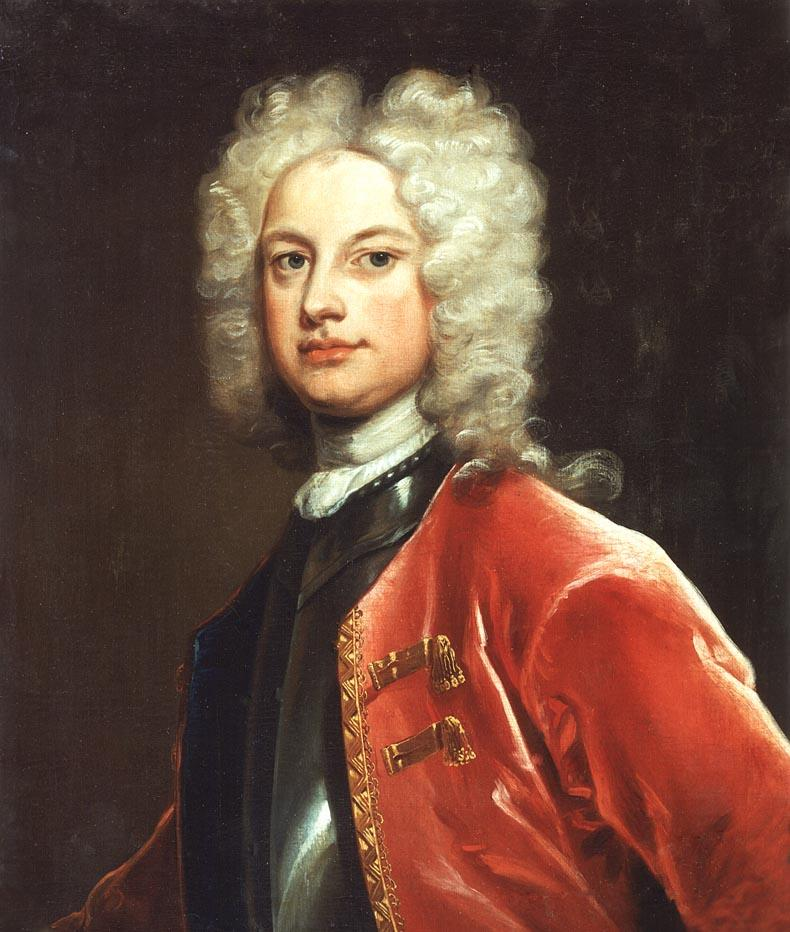
- Portrait by Charles Jervas, 1710

Governor of New York
- In office August 1732 – March 1736
- Monarch: George II
- Preceded by: Rip Van Dam
- Succeeded by: George Clarke

6th Colonial Governor of New Jersey
- In office August 1732 – March 1736
- Monarch: George II
- Preceded by: Lewis Morris, President of Council
- Succeeded by: John Anderson President of Council

Personal details
- Born: 1690 Stradbally Hall, Queen's County, Ireland
- Died: 10 March 1736 (aged 45–46) New York City
- Spouse: Grace Montagu
- Children: William, Grace, Elizabeth, Grace, Henry
- Profession: Army Colonel, Governor

Brigadier-General William Cosby (1690 – 10 March 1736) was a British Army officer and colonial administrator who served as the governor of New York from 1732 to 1736. During his short tenure as governor, Cosby was portrayed as one of the most oppressive governors in the Thirteen Colonies. In 1735, Cosby accused publisher John Peter Zenger of sedition and libel for publishing unflattering reports about him. In spite of Cosby's efforts, Zenger was acquitted of all charges and the case helped to establish the concept of freedom of the press.

== Early life and military career ==
William Cosby was born in Stradbally Hall, Queen's County, Ireland, in 1690. His father, Alexander Cosby of Stradbally, stemmed from an English family that emigrated to Ireland in 1590, by the first Alexander Cosby. His mother, Elizabeth L'Estrange, was from another family of the Protestant Ascendancy.

In 1709, 19-year-old William Cosby travelled to Italy and earned money by gambling in card games. The next year he enlisted in the British Army at Spain, under General Stanhope's command. In successive years, his military career progressed: cornet of the 5th Dragoon Guards (24 August 1705), captain of the 2nd Dragoon Guards, Harvey's Regiment of Horse (15 April 1711) and colonel of the Royal Regiment of Ireland (24 December 1717 to 1732).

In 1711, Cosby married Grace Montagu, a lady with connections at the British court as a sister of George Montagu, 1st Earl of Halifax. They had five children: William (1713), Grace (1716), Elizabeth (1721, married Lord Augustus FitzRoy in 1734), Grace (1723) and Henry (1719). All of them were born in Britain, most within Westminster. Both sons followed careers in the military afterwards. A third son, Alexander, born 1717, is not recorded as a son of William in contemporary documents but was a son of Grace.

Cosby had a home in Soho Square and one in St. Leonard's Hill near Windsor, Berkshire.

== Balearic Islands ==
In 1717, Cosby was promoted to colonel of the Royal Regiment of Ireland. The next year, this regiment was transferred to Menorca, in the Balearic Islands. Cosby acted as governor of Menorca from 1718. His administration was unremarkable in most respects, but he ran into difficulties when he illegally seized a Portuguese ship and attempted to appropriate its valuable cargo of snuff for his own benefit.

== Governor of New York and New Jersey ==
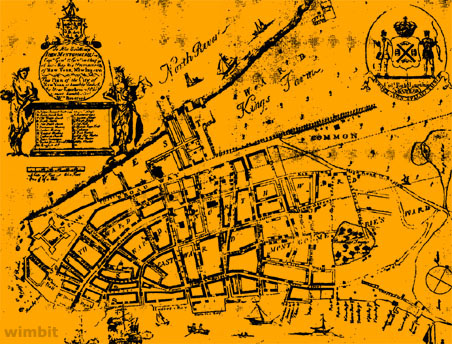
Manhattan Island in 1731

When George II of Britain was crowned, he transferred New York's governor, William Burnet, to be the governor of Massachusetts and New Hampshire. Burnet's successor, John Montgomerie, died soon after taking office. On 13 January 1732, George II appointed Cosby as "Captain General & Governor in Chief of the Provinces of New York, New Jersey and Territories depending thereon in America". The interim governor, who would serve until Cosby arrived in North America, was Rip Van Dam.

Thirteen months elapsed between Cosby's appointment and his arrival in New York. At the time, the colony of New York had 50,000 inhabitants, and the city only 9,000, but its port activity was booming with docks and shipyards.

=== Cosby's Manor ===
On 2 January 1734, King George II granted Cosby 22,000 acres on the Mohawk River, in what is now Herkimer County, New York. The land was named Cosby's Manor in 1736, and sold in 1772 to Philip Schuyler and four other proprietors. It included the later sites of Utica and Schuyler, New York.

Cosby was promoted to vice admiral on 29 September 1735, and to brigadier general on 30 November 1735, while serving as governor.

=== Salary disputes ===
The salaries of British colonial governors were always a contentious issue in eighteenth-century British America. When Cosby arrived in New York, he demanded that the acting governor, Van Dam, turn over half the salary he had received during his term to Cosby. Van Dam replied that he would not do so unless Cosby turned over half of the (presumably much larger) fees he had reaped from the office while in England. Cosby responded by taking Van Dam to court. Moreover, he insisted that the court proceed through equity jurisdiction, thus obviating the need for a jury. Equity proceedings were extremely unpopular in colonial America, especially if the equity courts were constituted without the colonial legislature's consent. Colonists saw them as a form of tyranny. Chief Justice Lewis Morris, aware of public opinion, dismissed Cosby's case on legal grounds on 9 April 1733. Cosby retaliated by removing Morris from office. He also dismissed Van Dam from the provincial council and named loyalist James De Lancey the new chief justice. Afterwards, Morris justified his decision in The New York Weekly Journal, an opposition newspaper. This episode was significant both because it was the precursor to the Zenger trial and because it augmented Cosby's reputation for arbitrary, tyrannical rule.

Meanwhile, Cosby secured an adequate salary for himself by refusing to call for new elections to the New York General Assembly. The grateful assemblymen willingly voted him five years of support.

=== Court party vs Country party ===
As a direct consequence of the removal of Lewis Morris, two political forces were consolidated:

- The court party or Tory faction. Its partisans included Adolphe Philipse, son of Frederick Philipse I of Philipse Manor, and Philip Van Cortlandt, son of Stephanus Van Cortlandt who was a father-in-law of Frederick Philipse I. This faction was led by De Lancey.
- The country party, or Morrisites. Its partisans included Lewis Morris, Rip Van Dam, James Alexander, William Smith (a lawyer disbarred by Cosby from the government), and others.

While these two parties did not include the whole of colonial New York's political spectrum, the conflict between them became one of the central axes of New York political life. Both parties were dominated by wealthy, land-owning clans, but the court party was more cosmopolitan than the country party, which focused on provincial economic development.

In 1735–1736, Morris visited London to plead his case directly to the crown. He failed either to secure Cosby's dismissal as governor or to secure his own reappointment as chief justice. Nevertheless, Morris was ultimately appointed governor of New Jersey. In New York, the Septennial Act of 1743 ensured that assembly elections would henceforth be held at regular intervals, no less than once every seven years.

=== Hopewell encroaching ===
As governor, Cosby illegally seized lands owned by colonists in Hopewell, New Jersey, awarding them to his royalist allies, Dr Daniel Coxe and his son. Cosby pushed out the settlers, forcing them to repurchase their properties, and then, as supreme judicial official of the colony, rejected the popular pleas led by Lewis Morris.

Before leaving for North Carolina, the former settlers retaliated. Armed with tar and feathers, they attacked the new householders and many government functionaries. Cosby's subsequent official proclamation stated that "...he or they may be brought to condign Punishment... (so) I do hereby promise to Pay to the Discovered the Sum of Thirty Pounds Proclamation Money...(as reward)" (1735).

=== Native American relations ===
Ensconced in his own world of self-enrichment and political repression, Cosby neglected his duties in frontier affairs. Military expeditions were easily defeated by Chickasaws, Catawbas, and Cherokees. The Iroquois tribes benefited from Cosby's dereliction, reorganising their Six Nations confederation as a powerful military threat.

=== Lifelong rewards struggle ===
During Cosby's term in office, he granted "extraordinary salaries", either lifelong or for a stated term of years, to government officers or fellow royalists as rewards for loyal service. His authority to do so was limited by the general assembly. Those salaries were often cancelled as a result of the festering rivalry between the court and country parties.

== Zenger case ==
The New York Weekly Journal was an opposition newspaper, pro-colonist and anti-royal, supported financially by the Morrisites. It was founded in 1733 by John Peter Zenger, a German immigrant. Its mordant editorials were mainly written by socially notorious people, Morrisites like James Alexander, who published anonymously.

Its most controversial editorials were about:

- Morris's deposition
- Cosby's attempt to rig the 1734 elections
- Post-electoral satiric ballads, where royalist partisans were "petty fogging knaves" and the popular partisans would "make the scoundrel rascals fly"
- Cosby's stealing collected taxes
- Cosby's appropriation of Indian lands
- Official permission to French ships docking in New York's harbor

In November 1734, Cosby ordered his men to burn up four of its editions—7, 47, 48, 49—down at the pillory. Those allegedly contained seditious material. On 17 November, Zenger was arrested for seditious libel against Cosby. His arrest did not close the Journal. His wife, Anna, continued printing the newspaper.

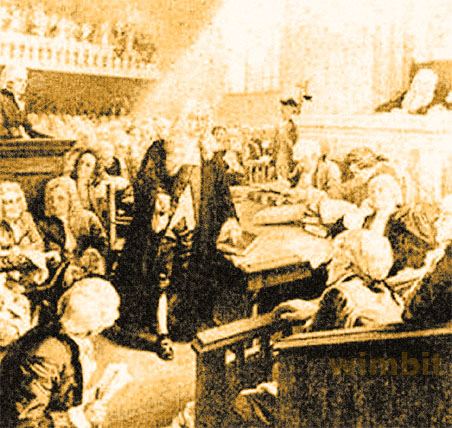
A depiction of Zenger's trial from 1912

Working through De Lancey, Cosby disbarred Zenger's local defenders, urging the jury to punish him. But the Morrisites hired Andrew Hamilton, a celebrated lawyer from Philadelphia, as Zenger's attorney. Hamilton argued that the newspaper could not be punished unless what it had printed was falsely seditious. The principle he proclaimed still stands in modern United States law: libel only exists when falsehoods are perpetrated. Zenger was acquitted by the jury on 18 August 1735. De Lancey declined to reverse that decision. Although the Zenger case did not entirely put an end to prosecutions for seditious libel, it set a precedent for freedom of the press.

== Death ==
Cosby died of tuberculosis on 10 March 1736, between 1 and 2 pm, in the Governor's House at Ft. George, today's Battery Park, New York City.

He was initially buried in a vault at Ft. George's chapel. But in 1788, his remains were moved to an unmarked grave at St Paul Church's Cemetery, New York, together with the remains of the Earl of Bellomont, who served as New York governor between 1698 and 1701.

George Clarke, the sitting lieutenant governor, assumed Cosby's office. He was a moderate loyalist of the court party, a former representative in the Provincial Council. He frustrated Van Dam's aspirations again, starting another political scandal, even before official confirmation of his appointment by the Crown.

== Legacy ==
Eighteenth-century observers believed that Governor William Cosby was motivated by two goals: defending British interests and building his private fortune. The British Crown's governors in British North America were seldom popular, but to some colonists, Cosby became a symbol of just how oppressive such governors could be. Cosby's political opponent Lewis Morris characterised Cosby's governorship as a reign of "a God damn ye", underlining Cosby's indifference to the wishes and welfare of those he governed.

Although Cosby's governorship was not a rewarding period for colonial New York, the struggles of the 1730s ultimately helped define the roles of the governor, the assembly, and the courts in provincial politics. They also fostered the development of the colony's first political parties. Historian Michael Kammen characterises Cosby's era as a period of "political awakening and modernization" in New York politics. Once the structural problems were addressed, politicians could turn their attention to the substantive issues and engage a larger portion of the population in political activity.

== See also ==
- Province of New York
- History of New York (state)
- List of extinct United States counties

Government offices
Preceded by Lord Londonderry	Governor of the Leeward Islands (acting); 1729	Succeeded by William Mathew, Jr.
Preceded by Rip Van Dam	Governor of the Province of New York; 1732–1736	Succeeded by George Clarke (acting)
Preceded by Lewis Morris (acting)	Governor of the Province of New Jersey; 1732–1736	Succeeded by John Anderson (acting)
Military offices
Preceded by Robert Stearne	Colonel of the Royal Regiment of Ireland; 1717–1732	Succeeded by Sir Charles Hotham, 5th Baronet
