= HMS Colchester (1707) =

Ship of the line of the Royal Navy

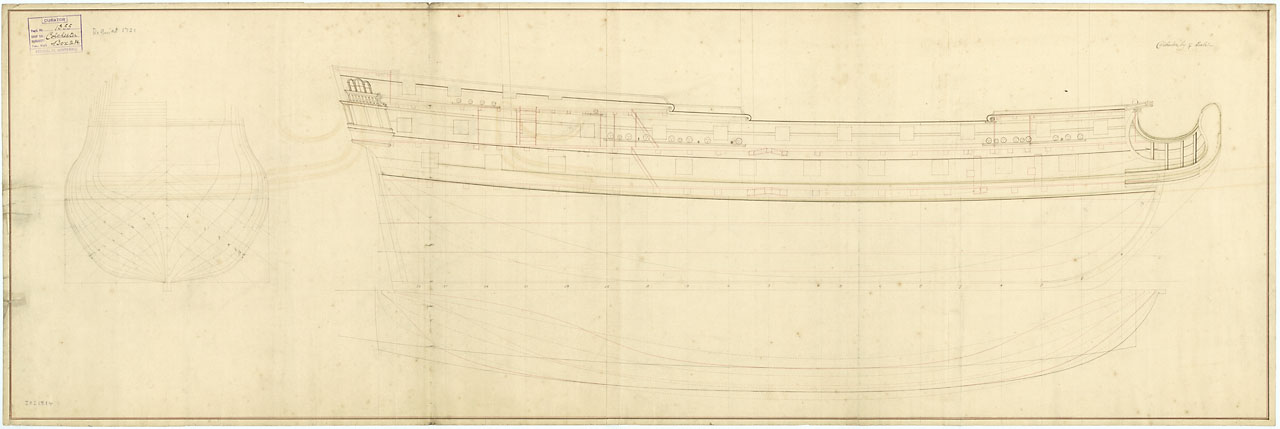
- Plan of Colchester's 1721 rebuild

History

Great Britain
- Name: HMS Colchester
- Builder: Allin, Deptford Dockyard
- Launched: 13 February 1707
- Fate: Broken up, 1742

General characteristics as built
- Class & type: 50-gun fourth-rate ship of the line
- Tons burthen: 682
- Length: 130 ft 6 in (39.8 m) (gundeck)
- Beam: 34 ft 5 in (10.5 m)
- Depth of hold: 13 ft 6 1/2 in (4.1 m)
- Propulsion: Sails
- Sail plan: Full-rigged ship
- Armament: 50 guns of various weights of shot

General characteristics after 1721 rebuild
- Class & type: 1719 Establishment 50-gun fourth-rate ship of the line
- Tons burthen: 756
- Length: 134 ft (40.8 m) (gundeck)
- Beam: 36 ft (11.0 m)
- Depth of hold: 15 ft 2 in (4.6 m)
- Propulsion: Sails
- Sail plan: Full-rigged ship
- Armament: 50 guns: Gundeck: 22 × 18-pdrs; Upper gundeck: 22 × 9-pdrs; Quarterdeck: 4 × 6-pdrs; Forecastle: 2 × 6-pdrs

HMS Colchester was a 50-gun fourth-rate ship of the line of the Royal Navy, built by Joseph Allin the elder at Deptford Dockyard and launched on 13 February 1707.

She underwent a rebuild at Chatham according to the 1719 Establishment, and was relaunched on 26 October 1721. Colchester served until 1742, when she was broken up.
