= The New York Weekly Journal =

Newspaper

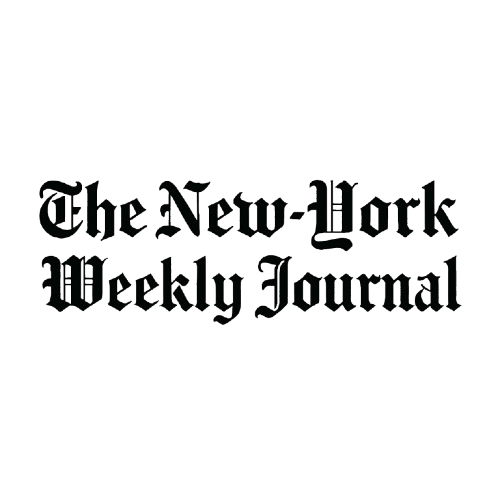
- Founder: John Peter Zenger
- Founded: November 5, 1733
- Ceased publication: March 18, 1751
- Language: English
- Headquarters: New York City, United States

The New York Weekly Journal was a weekly journal, printed by John Peter Zenger, from November 5, 1733 to March 18, 1751. It was the second journal in New York City and the only one that criticized New York Royal governor William Cosby, for which reason the journal was burned in its first year and John Zenger was put in prison. Zenger was released without charges, this being one of the earliest cases where a fight for the freedom of press led to a victory in America.

== History ==
In 1733, the only newspaper in New York was the New-York Gazette, and its printer, William Bradford, was a supporter of then New York Governor, William Cosby. The Popular Party wanted to attack Governor Cosby, and the only other printer in New York was John Peter Zenger, who had come from Germany to America in 1697, went to New York in 1711, and worked with Bradford for eight years before he started his own print business on Smith Street.

== First publication ==
Its first publications started on November 5, 1733. It has contributions made anonymously by James Alexander, William Smith, and Lewis Morris. The journal targeted the new royal governor of New York, William Cosby, and his conduct. The journal was freely published for two months.

== Burning of New York Weekly Journal ==
On January 15, 1734, Cosby ordered public burning of the newspaper on Wall Street, close to City Hall, and also offered fifty pounds as reward for who revealed the names of the Journal's authors.

== John Peter Zenger arrest ==
On November 17 John Peter Zenger was arrested under a warrant of the Council for printing seditious libels in his Journal. Zenger was placed in the City Jail then located in the attic of New York City Hall.

On October 15, 1734, Chief Justice James De Lancey delivered a charge to the grand jury accusing the New York Weekly Journal of breaking the law of seditious libel in New York, but the grand jury returned with no indictments. Zenger's lawyers, Andrew Hamilton and William Smith, Sr., successfully argued that truth is a defense against charges of libel. Afterwards, De Lancey tried to convince the nineteen members of the grand jury that "just by reading the articles, one could tell that they were libels", but the grand jury returned no indictment again.

== Freedom of the press in United States ==
Zenger's victory became the seminal American case for freedom of the press.

In defending Zenger in this landmark case, Hamilton and Smith attempted to establish the precedent that a statement, even if defamatory, is not libelous if it can be proved, thus affirming freedom of the press in America. However, general distaste for Cosby was the main reason why Zenger was found not guilty, and succeeding royal governors clamped down on freedom of the press up until the American Revolution. This case is the groundwork of the aforementioned freedom, not the legal precedent. However, if they succeeded in convincing the jury, they failed in establishing the legal precedent. As late as 1804, the journalist Harry Croswell was prosecuted in a series of trials that led to the famous People v. Croswell. The courts repeatedly rejected the argument that truth was a defense against libel. It was only the next year that the assembly, reacting to this verdict, passed a law that allowed truth as a defense against a charge of libel.

== See also ==
- John Peter Zenger
- The New York Times
- Freedom of the press
- Freedom of speech in the United States
