= Richard Coote, 1st Earl of Bellomont =

Anglo-Irish politician and colonial administrator

The Right Honourable The Earl of Bellomont
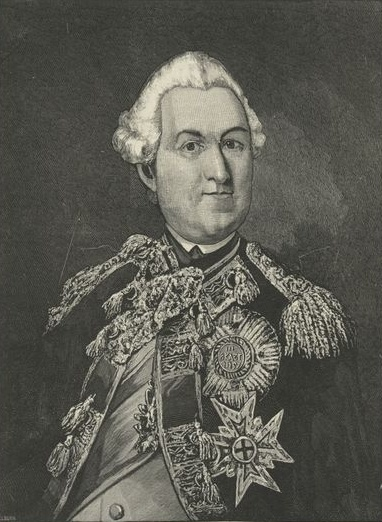
- Inaccurate c. 1888 portrait

12th Governor of the Province of New York
- In office 1698 – 1701 (1700 Julian)
- Monarchs: William III and Mary II
- Preceded by: Benjamin Fletcher
- Succeeded by: John Nanfan (acting)

2nd Governor of the Province of Massachusetts Bay
- In office 26 May 1699 – 17 July 1700
- Preceded by: William Stoughton (acting)
- Succeeded by: William Stoughton (acting)

Governor of the Province of New Hampshire
- In office 31 July 1699 – c. 15 August 1699
- Preceded by: Samuel Allen
- Succeeded by: William Partridge (acting)

Personal details
- Born: 1636 Ireland
- Died: 5 March 1701 (aged 64–65) or 5 March 1700 (aged 63–64) per Julian Province of New York

Richard Coote, 1st Earl of Bellomont (1636 – 5 March 1700/01), styled as The Lord Coote from 1683 to 1689, was an Anglo-Irish politician and colonial administrator who represented Droitwich in the House of Commons of England from 1688 to 1695. He was a prominent Williamite, supporting William III and Mary II during the Glorious Revolution.

In 1695, Coote was given commissions as governor of the English overseas possessions of New York, Massachusetts Bay, and New Hampshire, which he held until his death. He did not arrive in North America until 1698, and spent most of his tenure as governor in New York. Coote spent a little over a year in Massachusetts, and only two weeks in New Hampshire. His time in New York was marked by divisive politics resulting from Leisler's Rebellion, and difficult and ultimately unsuccessful negotiations to keep the Haudenosaunee from engaging in peace talks with New France. Frontier issues were also at the forefront during his time in Massachusetts and New Hampshire, where lumber and security from the Abenaki threat dominated his tenure.

Coote was also a major financial sponsor of William Kidd, whose privateering was later deemed to have descended into piracy. Bellomont engineered the arrest of Kidd in Boston, and had him returned to England, where he was tried, convicted, and hanged.

== Early life and career ==
Richard Coote was born in Cootehill, County Cavan, Ireland in 1636. He was the second son, but the first to survive infancy, of Richard Coote, third son of Sir Charles Coote, 1st Baronet, and Mary, daughter of Sir George St George. His father was created Baron Coote of Coloony in 1660 (on the same day as his uncle was created Earl of Mountrath), and he succeeded his father as Baron Coote on the latter's death on 10 July 1683.

Little is recorded of his early years. In 1677 he is known to have killed a man in a duel for the affections of a young lady. He did not marry her, however, and in 1680 he married Catherine, the daughter of Bridges Nanfan and the eventual heir to Birtsmorton Court in Worcestershire. They had two sons.

Following the accession of the pro-Catholic James II to the English throne, Coote, a Protestant, moved to the Continent and served as a captain in a cavalry unit of the Dutch States Army. Because of the family's record of service to Charles II, his absence from court eventually drew the king's attention, and he was summoned back to court in 1687. He was one of the first to join William of Orange in the Glorious Revolution of 1688 that brought William III and Mary II to the throne. He was rewarded for this loyalty with an appointment as Treasurer to the Queen in 1689, a post he held until 1694. It also drew unfavourable attention in the Irish Parliament. That body, still under the influence of James, attainted him and seized his lands. As a result of this, William on 2 November 1689 created him Earl of Bellomont, and granted him over 77,000 acres (31,000 ha) of forfeited Irish lands. The land grant was highly controversial in Parliament, and was eventually rescinded by William. He was also rewarded with the governorship of County Leitrim.

Bellomont was Member of Parliament for Droitwich from 1688 to 1695. In the 1690s he became involved in the attempts by Jacob Leisler's son to clear his father's name. Leisler had been a leading force in the New York rebellion against the Dominion of New England established by King James. Upon the arrival of Henry Sloughter as governor of New York, Leisler was arrested, tried, and executed for treason, and his properties were seized. Leisler's son Jacob Jr. travelled to England to argue the case for restoration of the family properties. Bellomont sat on the parliamentary committee that examined the evidence, and spoke in Parliament in support of Leisler's case. He strongly stated his view that Leisler and son-in-law Jacob Milborne had been "barbarously murdered" by Sloughter's actions in a letter to Massachusetts colonial agent Increase Mather. Young Leisler's efforts were successful: Parliament voted to reverse the attainder, and ordered that the family properties be restored.

== Colonial governor ==
The death in 1695 of Sir William Phips vacated the governorship of the Province of Massachusetts Bay. Colonial agents lobbied to select either Wait Winthrop or Joseph Dudley, both native sons, to replace Phips, but the king, wanting someone who would better represent crown authority, selected Bellomont. Since William wanted someone who could exert authority over more of New England, he was also given the governorships of New Hampshire, and New York. The major concern that Bellomont was instructed to address was ongoing problems with piracy, including the open commerce with pirates that went on in New York City and Rhode Island.

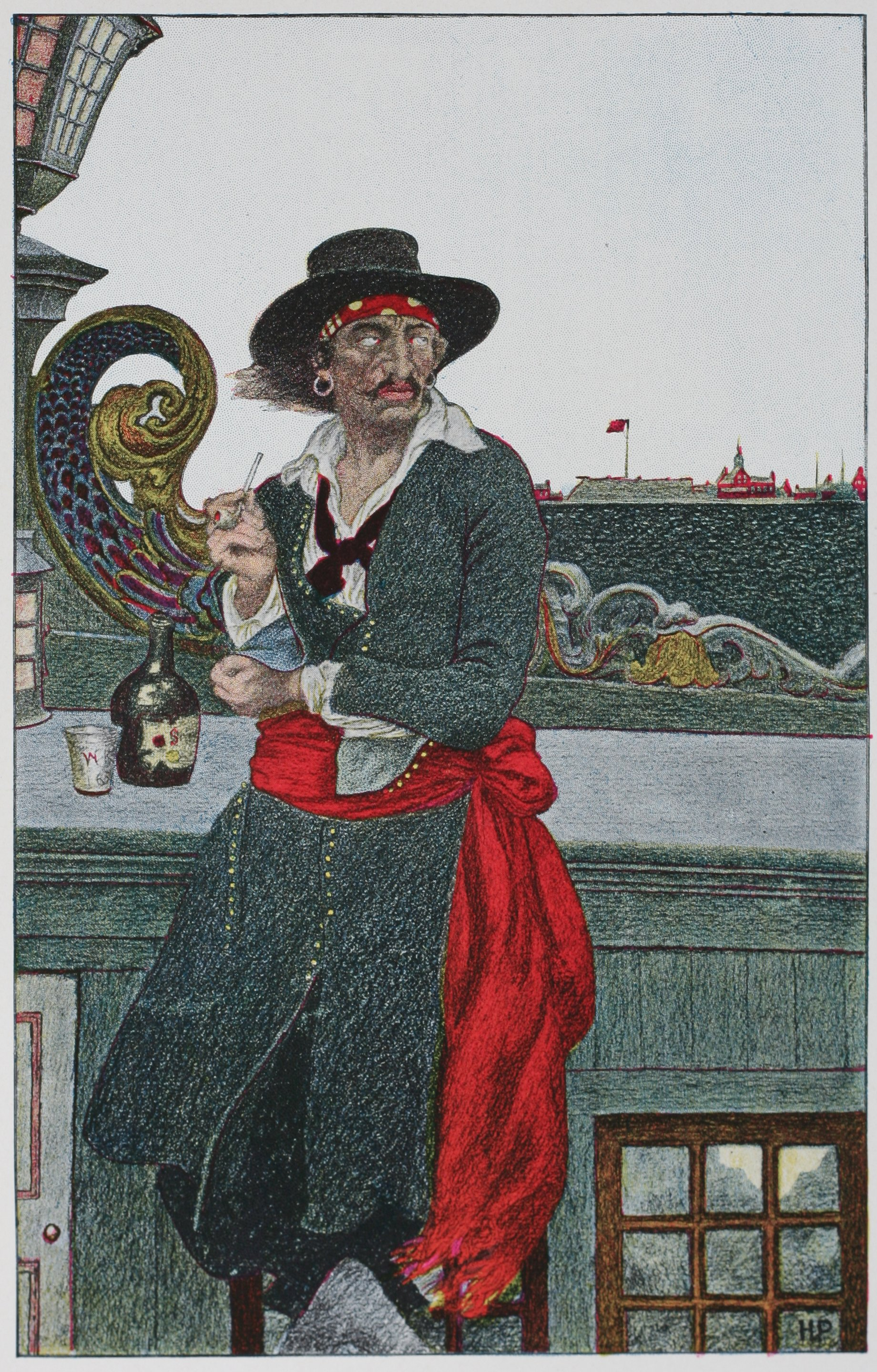
Howard Pyle's depiction of William Kidd aboard his ship in New York Harbor

Bellomont's commissions were not finalized until 1 June 1697. While they were being worked on, New York colonial agent Robert Livingston proposed to Bellomont that a privateer be outfitted to combat piracy, and recommended William Kidd be its captain. This scheme received the assent of King William, who issued a letter of marque to Kidd for the purpose, as well as a special commission for dealing with pirates. Bellomont raised £6,000 (including £1,000 of his own money, and funds from some of the Lords of the Admiralty) to outfit Kidd's ship.

=== New York ===
Bellomont sailed for New York in late 1697, accompanied by his wife and her cousin, John Nanfan, who had been appointed Lieutenant Governor of New York. The voyage was exceptionally stormy, and Bellomont's ship was blown well south, eventually putting into Barbados before continuing on to New York. He arrived in New York City on 2 April 1698. Bellomont's stylish dress, good looks, and positive relationship with the king predisposed New Yorkers to like him, but he very quickly ran into difficulties and began making enemies.

His attempts to enforce the Navigation Acts predictably turned merchants and traders against him. These attempts were also poorly executed by colonial officials whose interests lay more with those merchants than they did with the crown. He raised the anger of Leisler's opponents by implementing the act of Parliament, Leisler's Restoration Act 1695 (6 & 7 Will. & Mar. c. 30 Pr.), that he had helped pass, and saw through the restoration of Leisler's properties. There was so much opposition within his council to this that he ended up purging the council of those opposed. Bellomont also approved the exhumation of the remains of Leisler and his son-in-law Jacob Milborne, which had been unceremoniously buried under the gallows from which they had been hanged. He sanctioned a proper burial, and provided an honour guard of 100 soldiers for the service.

Bellomont's support of the Leislerians proved to be costly, not just in terms of New York politics, but in Indian diplomacy as well. Benjamin Fletcher, Bellomont's predecessor in office, had taken advantage of the long period between Bellomont's appointment and arrival to make some questionable land grants, including extended leases to properties normally allocated for the governor's use, and in territories that were still claimed by the Haudenosaunee. When the provincial assembly passed a law retracting all of these irregular grants, it predictably angered a number of large landowners. Land grants made in Haudenosaunee territory to Godfridius Dellius, the influential pastor of the Dutch Reformed Church in Albany, and others were a specific subject of Haudenosaunee complaints. Even though Bellomont's law was passed, the grantees appealed to the Board of Trade, and the bill never received royal assent.

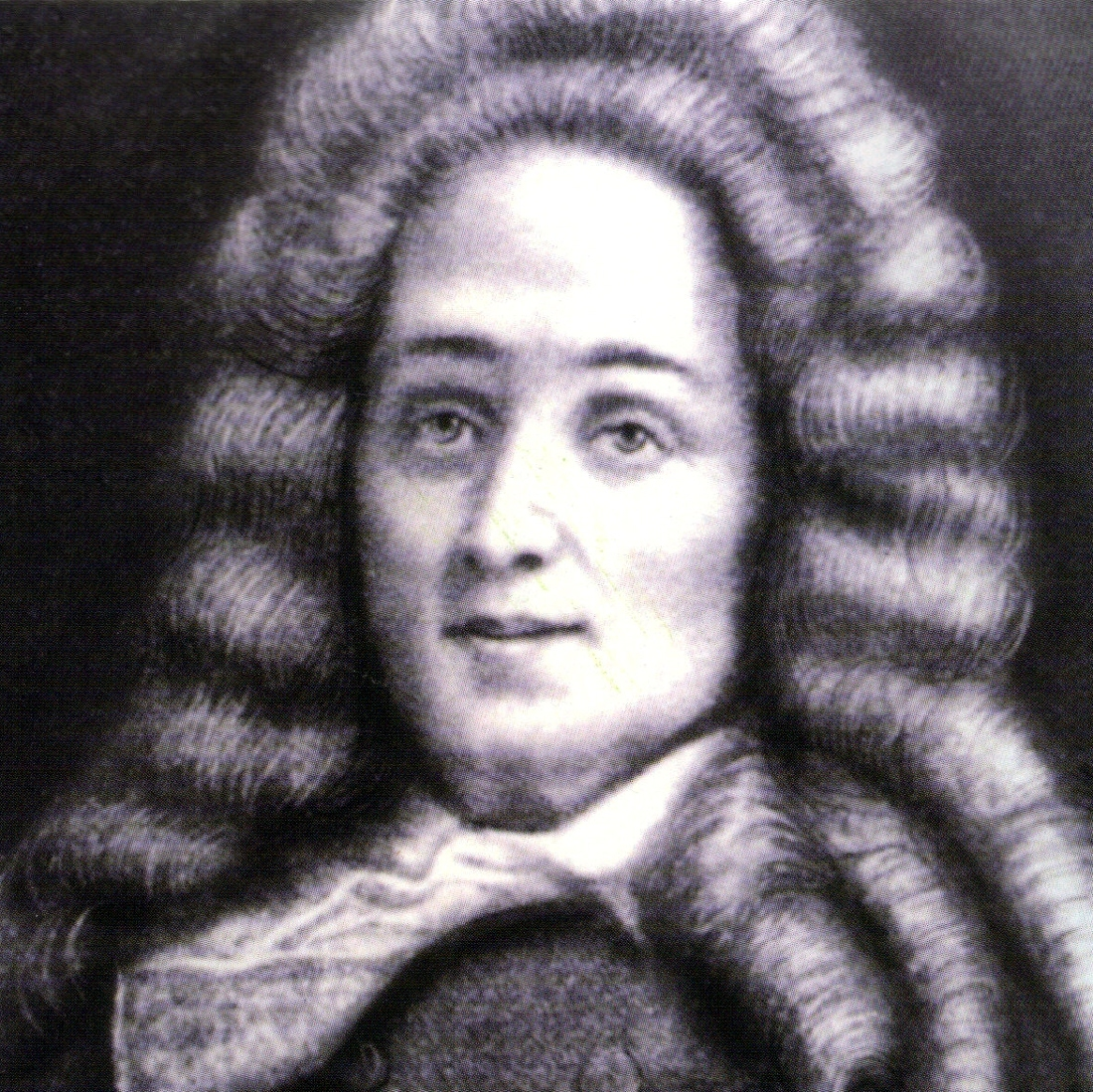
Hector de Callière was governor of New France while Bellomont governed New York.

Bellomont denied Dellius and other anti-Leislerians positions of importance in dealing with the Haudenosaunee, resulting in the loss of experienced negotiators. This affected internal Haudenosaunee politics, since supporters of interaction with the English lost influence when their English counterparts were sidelined. This came at a particularly delicate time, when Bellomont was working to strengthen the Covenant Chain that had been neglected by Fletcher.

After the Treaty of Ryswick ended war between the French and English in 1697, the French continued to make war on the Haudenosaunee (primarily through their Algonquian allies in the Great Lakes region), and inflicted significant casualties on them. The Haudenosaunee sought the assistance of the English to combat this, threatening to make peace with the French if they did not receive help. Bellomont and French Governor General Louis-Hector de Callière both claimed dominance over the Haudenosaunee, and each refused to acknowledge the other's right to intercede on their behalf. When Callière summoned the Haudenosaunee to Montreal for negotiations in 1699, Bellomont was alerted, and successfully manoeuvred the Haudenosaunee into not going by sending an emissary to Montreal and troops to Albany under Lieutenant Governor Nanfan. The English emissary was unsuccessful in swaying the French from their course of action, and French-allied Algonquians made incursions deep into Haudenosaunee territory in 1700.

In negotiations with the Haudenosaunee, Bellomont overlooked some of the social elements that Haudenosaunee customs demanded, with the result that the parties ended with differing views of how successful their councils were. Bellomont believed they went well, even though it was fairly clear that the Haudenosaunee negotiators were unhappy with how the discussion had gone. He promised them the construction of a fort at Onondaga, and even convinced the legislature to appropriate £1,000 for its construction, but the Haudenosaunee were evasive on accepting this "gift", and never showed English engineers suitable locations for a fort. Bellomont's attempts to prevent the Haudenosaunee from dealing with the French were negated by the French military successes of 1700, which brought the Haudenosaunee to a peace council that resulted in the 1701 Great Peace of Montreal.

=== Massachusetts and New Hampshire ===
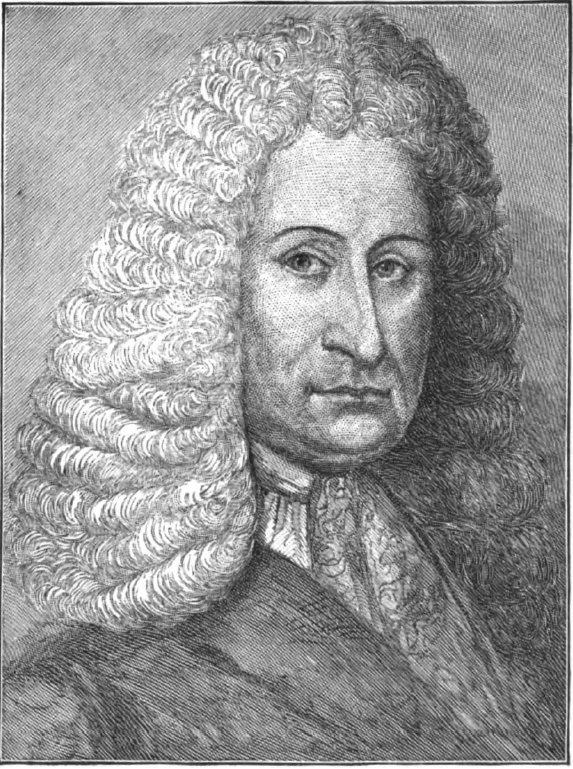
Bellomont's Massachusetts advisor, Elisha Cooke Sr.

In May 1699 Bellomont sailed for Boston. Bellomont spent 14 months in New England in 1699 and 1700, spending a few weeks of that time in New Hampshire and the rest in Massachusetts. In Massachusetts he was treated politely, but his attempts to implement the crown's policies ran into trouble, as they had in New York. He was refused a salary by the colonial legislature, although the "gift" of £1,000 he received was more than that typically given to other governors of the province. The legislature also made repeated attempts to limit appeals to London of judicial decisions handed down by provincial courts. Bellomont, as he was required to do, forwarded laws passed by the legislature to the Board of Trade for approval; these laws were repeatedly struck down because of provisions that attempted to limit royal prerogatives. He also sided politically against Lieutenant Governor William Stoughton, who was an ally of Joseph Dudley, a Massachusetts native who had presided over the trial of Jacob Leisler. Instead, he took council with the populist leader Elisha Cooke Sr.

Not long after his arrival in Boston, Bellomont engineered the arrest of William Kidd. Rumours had reached the colonies that Kidd had descended into piracy, and he came to be viewed by Bellomont and the other high-profile investors in Kidd's ship as a liability. In November 1698 the Admiralty issued orders to all colonial governors to apprehend Kidd. When he was informed by an agent of Kidd's in June 1699 that Kidd was in the area, Bellomont sent a message back to Kidd, promising clemency. Kidd responded that he would come, sending some of his treasures as a present to Lady Bellomont; she refused them.

After Kidd's arrival in Boston on 3 July, Bellomont demanded from Kidd a written account of his travels, which Kidd, after haggling over the time, agreed to deliver on the morning of 6 July. When he did not do so, Bellomont issued a warrant for his arrest. It was executed as Kidd was en route to see Bellomont at midday the same day. Kidd then attempted to negotiate his freedom, using the secret locations of his treasure and a captured prize ship as bargaining chips. Although a portion of Kidd's treasure was recovered, it did not buy Kidd's freedom, and he was shipped to London in April 1700, where he was tried, convicted, and hanged. In contrast to the relative secrecy with which he conducted some of his communications with Kidd, Bellomont was scrupulous in his dealings with other potentially questionable merchant and pirate business, despite being offered as much as £5,000 to overlook illicit activities.

Matters of frontier security and the lumber trade dominated his brief administration in New England. New England was recognized as an important source of ship masts for the Royal Navy, and the Board of Trade and the Admiralty sought to reserve suitable trees for the crown's benefit. In both provinces, he encountered opposition to entrenched land and timber interests that resented the intrusion of surveyors onto their lands, and interfered with their taking of lumber from lands that had not been granted and were thus reserved to the crown.

In New Hampshire the timber dispute was overlaid by ongoing disputes between local landowners and Samuel Allen, a London merchant who had acquired the territorial claims of the heirs of John Mason, the province's founder, and was pursuing them against those landowners. Allen, who had been commissioned governor of the province in 1692, only came to the colony in 1698 to take a direct interest in its affairs. During Bellomont's brief visit to New Hampshire in July and August 1699, Allen attempted to buy him to his side. Allen offered his daughter (with a large dowry) as a marriage match for the earl's son; Bellomont refused the offer.

=== Abenaki relations ===
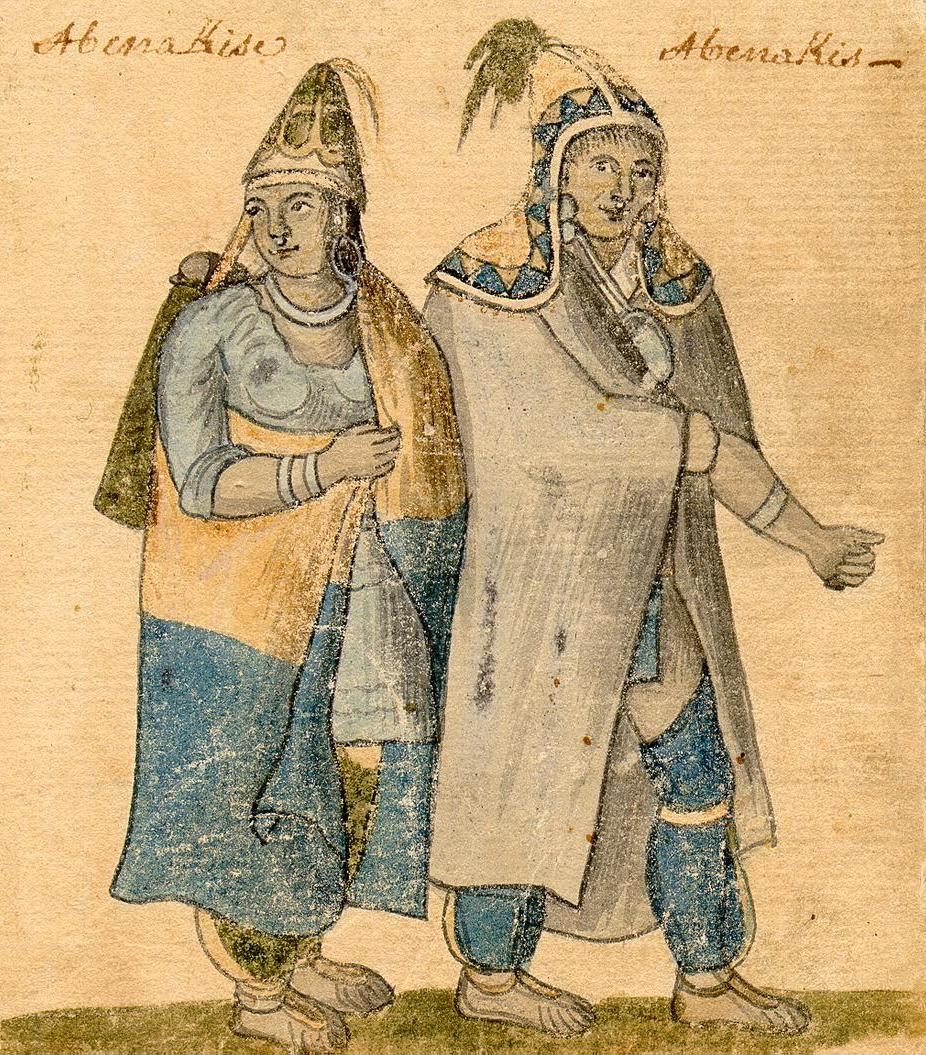
18th century depiction of an Abenaki couple

The frontier situation that Bellomont encountered during his time in Massachusetts and New Hampshire was somewhat tense, because the Abenaki of northern New England (like the Haudenosaunee in New York) had not been involved in the Treaty of Ryswick that ended King William's War. In the aftermath of the war, they and the settlers of Maine and New Hampshire were extremely mistrustful of one another. The Abenaki felt threatened by settler encroachment on their lands, and English colonists feared a return to significant French-inspired raiding of their settlements. Bellomont issued proclamations to distribute among the Abenaki denying plans to take their lands, but was unable to ease the underlying tensions.

One reason for this was his naive assumption that Abenaki concerns were rooted in a French Catholic conspiracy. When English negotiators attempted to separate the Abenaki from their Jesuit missionaries, this upset ongoing trade negotiations, and did nothing to assuage Puritan New England concerns over the activities of "Popish Emissaries" intriguing to make war on them. The colonial legislature passed a law banning Roman Catholics from territory claimed by the province, which included Abenaki territory claimed by Governor Sir William Phips in 1693. Bellomont engaged in fruitless attempts to convince the eastern Abenaki to migrate west, where they would come under Haudenosaunee influence; this was unsuccessful, in part because the Abenaki and Haudenosaunee had a history of conflict. Despite these difficulties, he managed to achieve a precarious peace with the Abenaki in January 1699.

Abenaki relations were also complicated by misunderstandings about sovereignty. The Abenaki viewed themselves as sovereign, while the English believed them to be subjects, either to themselves or to the French. A prisoner exchange involving English held by the Abenaki and Indians held by the English was frustrated when Bellomont believed that it would be sufficient to negotiate with his counterpart in Quebec to obtain the release of the English prisoners.

== Return to New York and death ==
He returned to New York in 1700, where he resumed actions against piracy and illegal shipping. Following a conference with the Haudenosaunee at Albany in early 1701 (1700 Julian) which Bellomont characterized as "greatest fatigue [I] ever underwent," he returned to New York City, where he succumbed to a severe case of gout on 5 March. He was buried in the chapel of Fort William. When the fort was dismantled, his remains were moved to the yard of St. Paul's Chapel.

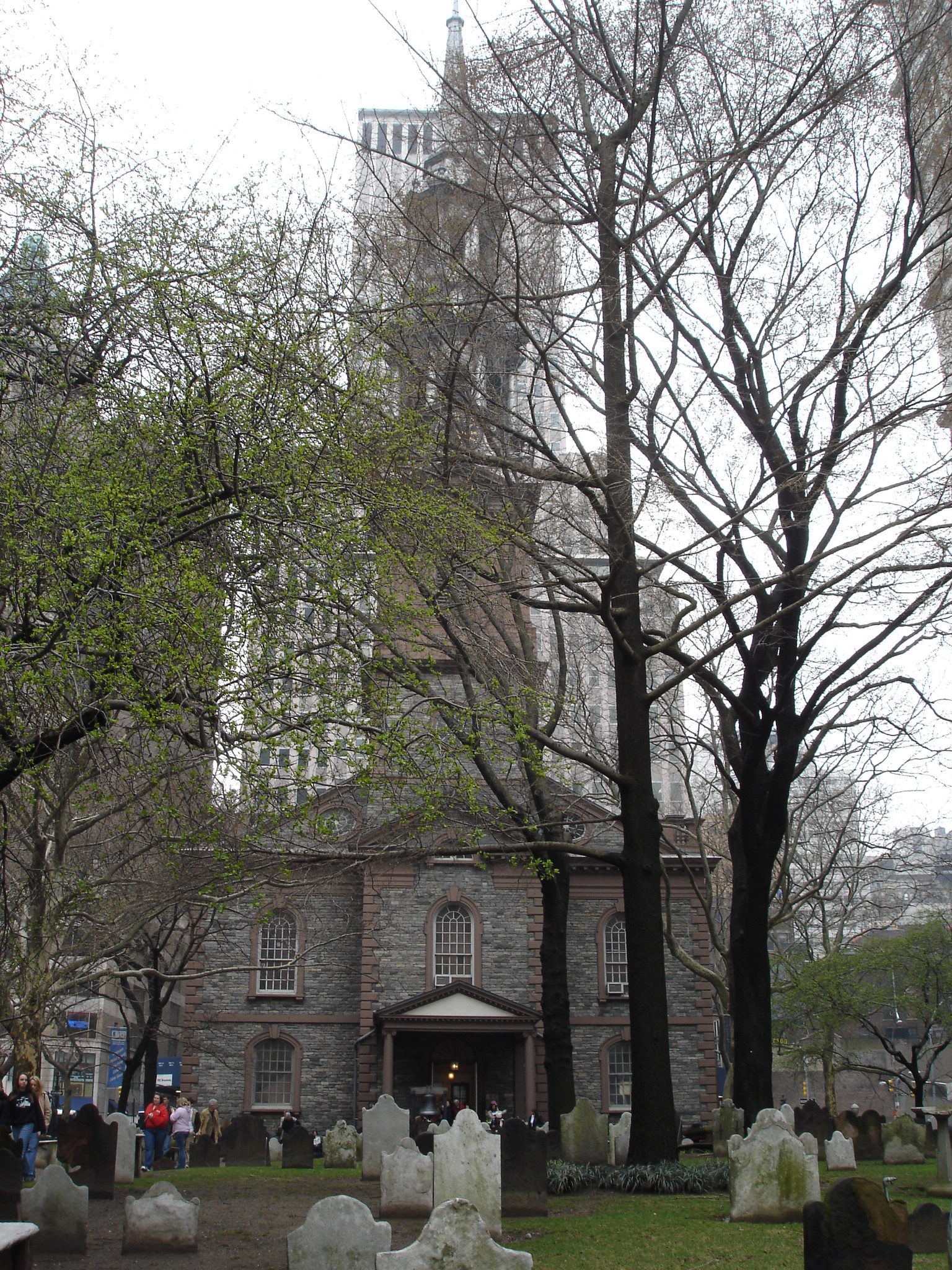
St. Paul's Chapel yard, location of Bellomont's grave

Lieutenant Governor Nanfan acted as New York's governor until the arrival of Lord Cornbury in 1702. Nanfan, during his brief tenure, reached the peace agreement that eluded Bellomont. In an agreement negotiated later in 1701, the Haudenosaunee signed an agreement putting their westernmost territorial claims (spanning from present-day Erie, Pennsylvania to Chicago and northern Michigan) under the English crown's protection.

== Family, titles, and legacy ==
Bellomont's eldest son, Nanfan, Lord Coloony, succeeded to the earldom on his death. His second son Richard, succeeded in turn as 3rd earl on his elder brother's death. On the 3rd earl's death without surviving male heirs, the earldom became extinct, while the barony devolved on his cousin, Sir Charles Coote, who was later also created Earl of Bellomont. He died without male issue, and all of the titles were then extinguished.

Bellomont's rule in New York was not remembered fondly. One political opponent, noting that the provincial debt rose substantially during his tenure, wrote that the memory of Bellomont "will stink in the nostrills of all good men", and Robert Livingston reported that the debt was "a greater Debt than I had ever seen". Bellomont's personal affairs were also difficult to tie up: his creditors tried (unsuccessfully) to prevent his wife's departure from the province in order to compel settlement of his personal debts. Bellomont's financial issues were not unique in this respect. Later governors (including Nanfan and Cornbury) were arrested on charges of malfeasance and personal indebtedness at the behest of their political opponents. New York's debt problems were not resolved until the Hunter administration in 1717.

== Notes ==
Parliament of England
Preceded by Thomas Windsor	Member of Parliament for Droitwich; 1688–1695; With: Samuel Sandys (1688–1689); Philip Foley (1690–1695)	Succeeded by Charles Cocks
Government offices
Preceded by William Stoughton (acting)	Governor of the Province of Massachusetts Bay; 26 May 1699 – 17 July 1700	Succeeded by William Stoughton (acting)
Preceded by Samuel Allen	Governor of the Province of New Hampshire; 31 July 1699 – c. 15 August 1699	Succeeded by William Partridge (acting)
Preceded by Benjamin Fletcher	Governor of the Province of New York; 1698 – 5 March 1700/1	Succeeded by John Nanfan (acting)
Peerage of Ireland
New creation	Earl of Bellomont; 1689–1701	Succeeded by Nanfan Coote
Preceded by Richard Coote	Baron Coote; 1683–1701	Succeeded by Nanfan Coote
