= HMS Berwick (1679) =

Ship of the line of the Royal Navy

History

England
- Name: HMS Berwick
- Ordered: April 1677
- Builder: Chatham Dockyard
- Launched: May 1679
- Commissioned: 1689
- Honours and awards: Barfleur 1692; Vigo 1702; Gibraltar 1704; Velez Malaga 1704
- Fate: Hulked at Portsmouth 1715 and Broken at Portsmouth in August 1742

General characteristics as built
- Class & type: 70-gun third rate ship of the line
- Tons burthen: 1,04123/94 tons (bm)
- Length: 150 ft 10 in (45.97 m) gundeck; 121 ft 4 in (36.98 m)
- Beam: 40 ft 0 in (12.19 m)
- Draught: 17 ft 0 in (5.18 m)
- Depth of hold: 17 ft 0 in (5.18 m)
- Propulsion: Sails
- Sail plan: Full-rigged ship
- Armament: 1677 Establishment 72/60 guns; 26 × demi-cannons 54 cwt – 9.5 ft (LD); 26 × 12-pdr guns 32 cwt – 9 ft (UD); 10 × sakers 16 cwt – 7 ft (QD); 4 × sakers 16 cwt – 7 ft (Fc); 5 × 5 3-pdr guns 5 cwt – 5 ft (RH)

General characteristics 1697/1700 rebuild
- Class & type: 70-gun third rate ship of the line
- Tons burthen: 1,09049/94 tons (bm)
- Length: 150 ft 9 in (45.95 m) gundeck; 125 ft 3 in (38.18 m) keel for tonnage
- Beam: 40 ft 5.5 in (12.33 m)
- Depth of hold: 16 ft 10 in (5.13 m)
- Propulsion: Sails
- Sail plan: Full-rigged ship
- Armament: 1685 Establishment 70/62 guns; 26 × demi-cannons 54 cwt – 9.5 ft (LD); 26 × demi-culverins (UD); 10 × sakers 16 cwt – 7 ft (QD); 4 × sakers 16 cwt – 7 ft (Fc); 5 × 5 3-pdr guns 5 cwt – 5 ft (RH)

HMS Berwick was a 70-gun third rate ship of the line of the Royal Navy, built at Chatham Dockyard during 1677/1679. After completion she was placed in Ordinary for 10 years. She was commissioned for the War of the English Succession 1689–1697, participating in the battles of Beachy Head and Barfleur. She was rebuilt between 1697 and 1700. She was commissioned for the War of Spanish Succession 1702–1712, participating in the battles of Vigo Bay, Capture of Gibraltar and Velez Malaga. placed in Ordinary in 1712, she was converted to a hulk at Portsmouth in 1715 before being broken in 1742.

This was the first vessel to bear the name Berwick in the English and Royal Navy.

HMS Berwick was awarded the battle honours Barfleur 1692 Vigo 1702, Gibraltar 1704, and Velez-Malaga 1704.

== Construction and specifications ==
She was ordered in April 1677 to be built at Chatham Dockyard under the guidance of Master Shipwright Phineas Pett. She was launched in May 1679. Her dimensions were a gundeck of 150 feet 10 inches (45.97 metres) with a keel of 121 feet 4 inches (36.98 metres) for tonnage calculation with a breadth of 40 feet 2 inches (12.24 metres) and a depth of hold of 17 feet 0 inches (5.18 metres). Her builder's measure tonnage was calculated as 1,04123/94 tons (burthen). Her draught was 17 feet 0 inches (5.18 metres).

Her initial gun armament was in accordance with the 1677 Establishment with 70/62 guns consisting of twenty-six demi-cannons (54 cwt, (Note: "cwt", or "hundredweight" refers to the weight of the gun itself) 9.5 ft) on the lower deck, twenty-four 12-pounder guns (32 cwt, 9 ft) on the upper deck, ten sakers (16 cwt, 7 ft) on the quarterdeck and four sakers (16 cwt, 7 ft) on the foc's'le with four 3-pounder guns (5 cwt, 5 ft) on the poop deck or roundhouse. By 1688 she would carry 70 guns as per the 1685 Establishment . Her initial manning establishment would be for a crew of 460/380/300 personnel.

== Commissioned service ==
=== Service 1679 to 1700 ===
She was commissioned in 1689 under the command of Captain Edward Stanley. Later in 1689 she was under command of Captain Henry Martin for the Battle of Beachy Head in Rear (Blue) Squadron on 30 June 1690. She fought in the Battle of Barfleur in Rear (Blue) Squadron, Centre Division from 19 to 22 May 1692. She also partook in the Battles off Cherbourg and La Hogue on 23 and 24 May 1692. She sailed with Russel's Fleet in the Mediterranean in October 1694. Captain Robert Sincock was in command in 1696 off Cape Clear. During 1697/98 she was under the command of Captain Lord Archibald Hamilton sailing with the Dunkirk Squadron. She would be rebuilt at Deptford in 1700.

=== Rebuild Deptford 1697-1700 ===
She was ordered rebuilt (possibly) in November 1697 under contract by Edward Snelgrove of Deptford. She was launched/completed in May 1700. Her dimensions were a gundeck of 150 feet 9 inches (45.95 metres) with a keel of 125 feet 3 inches (38.18 metres) for tonnage calculation with a breadth of 40 feet 5.5 inches (12.33 metres) and a depth of hold of 16 feet 10 inches (5.13 metres) . Her builder's measure tonnage was calculated as 1,09049/94 tons (burthen). She probably retained her armament as stated in the 1685 Establishment, though it is unclear if her armament was changed to the 1703 Establishment later. It is known that when completed her gun armament total at least 70 guns.

=== Service 1701 to 1715 ===
HMS Berwick was commissioned in 1701 under the command of Captain John Leake for service with Sir George Rooke's Fleet. In 1702 she came under Captain Richard Edwards remaining with Admiral Rooke's Fleet in Vice-Admiral (of the Red) Thomas Hopsonn's Squadron. The Fleet departed Portsmouth on 19 July 1702 for the Soundings at the Scilly Islands. Finally departing for Cadiz, Spain on the 22nd arriving at the Bay of Bulls, north of Cadiz on 8 August. After some success and much indecision on how to proceed the troops were withdrawn on 15 September and the Fleet departed by the 19th.

On 21 September it was learned from a watering expedition to Lagos, Portugal, that the Spanish Treasure Fleet and its French escort was in the vicinity of Vigo Bay. The Fleet sailed North to engage these vessels. After a council of War on 11 October, it was decided that only 25 vessels would be selected to attack the enemy vessels. She fought in the Battle of Vigo Bay as a member White Squadron under the command of Rear-Admiral Sir Stafford Fairborne on 12 October. All enemy vessels were either taken or destroyed and much treasure was taken. The Fleet returned to England.

By September 1703 she was back in the Mediterranean with Sir George Rooke's Fleet. In 1704 she came under the command of Captain Robert Fairfax remaining with Rooke's Fleet. On 23 July 1704 she participated in the Capture of Gibraltar. She participated in the defense of Gibraltar at the Battle of Velez Malaga as a member of the Van Squadron on 13 August 1704. She suffered 23 killed with 24 wounded. In 1705 she came under the command of Captain Thomas Lisle until 1712. She remained in the Mediterranean 1706 thru 1707. She was at Alicante, Spain in July 1706. She was with Byng's Fleet at the Downs and North Sea during 1708–10. She went to Lisbon, Portugal in May 1710. Following this she escorted the Brazilian Fleet before returning to the Mediterranean in 1711. For 1711 thru 1712 she was in the English Channel. With the end of the War of Spanish Succession she was placed in Ordinary.

== Disposition ==
In October 1715, she was fitted as a hulk at Portsmouth. She was finally broken at Portsmouth in August 1742.
