= List of colonial governors of New York =

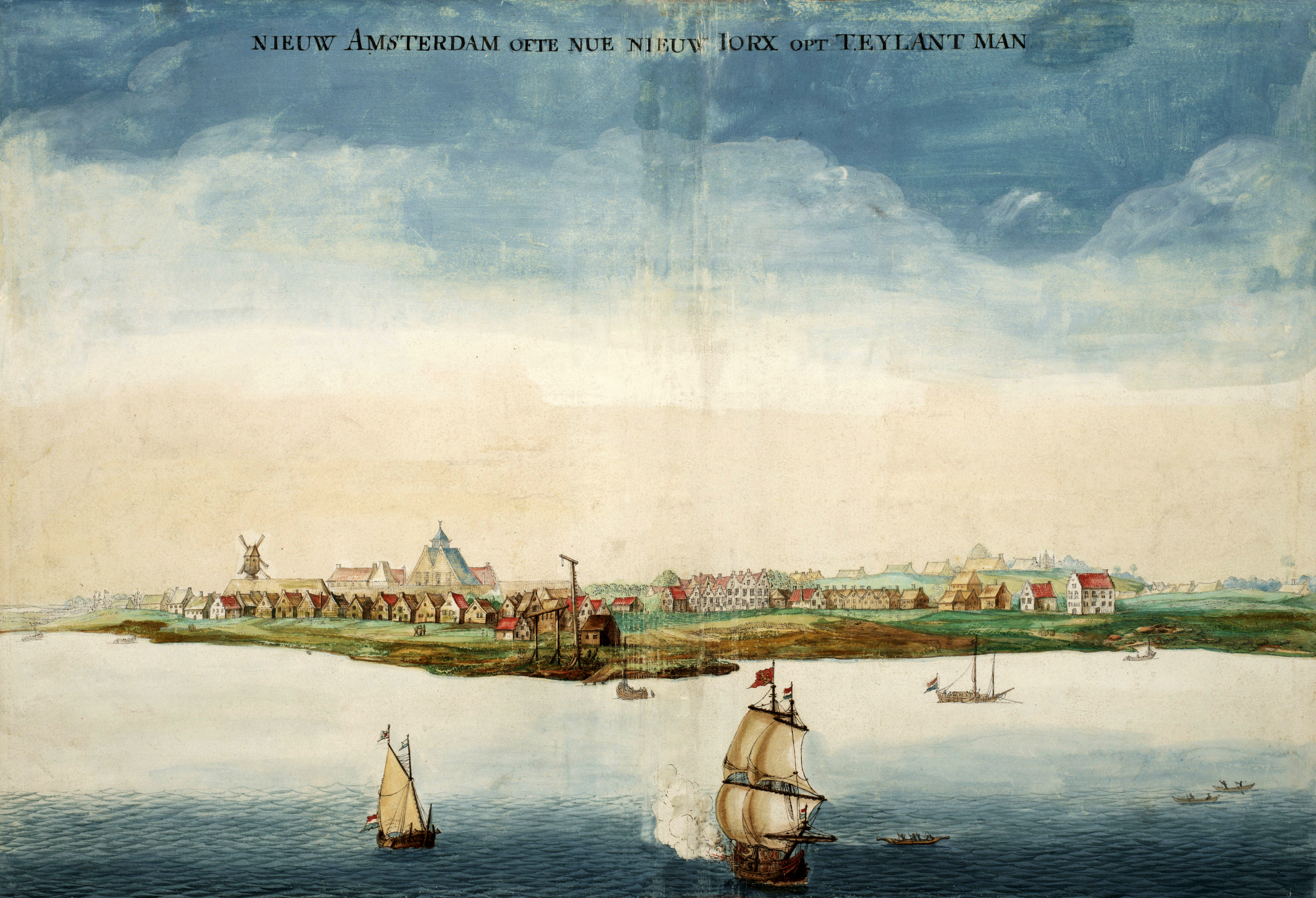
A drawing by Johannes Vingboons of the city of New Amsterdam in 1664—the year the Dutch authorities surrendered the New Netherland colony to the English under Richard Nicholls

The territory which would later become the state of New York was settled by European colonists as part of the New Netherland colony (parts of present-day New York, New Jersey, Connecticut and Delaware) under the command of the Dutch West India Company in the Seventeenth Century. These colonists were largely of Dutch, Flemish, Walloon, and German stock, but the colony soon became a "melting pot." In 1664, at the onset of the Second Anglo-Dutch War, English forces under Richard Nicolls ousted the Dutch from control of New Netherland, and the territory became part of several different English colonies. Despite one brief year when the Dutch retook the colony (1673–1674), New York would remain an English and later British possession until the American colonies declared independence in 1776.

With the unification of the two proprietary colonies of East Jersey and West Jersey in 1702, the provinces of New York and the neighboring colony New Jersey shared a royal governor. This arrangement began with the appointment of Queen Anne's cousin, Edward Hyde, Lord Cornbury as Royal Governor of New York and New Jersey in 1702, and ended when New Jersey was granted its own governor in 1738.

== Dutch Era of New Netherland (1624–1664; 1673–1674) ==
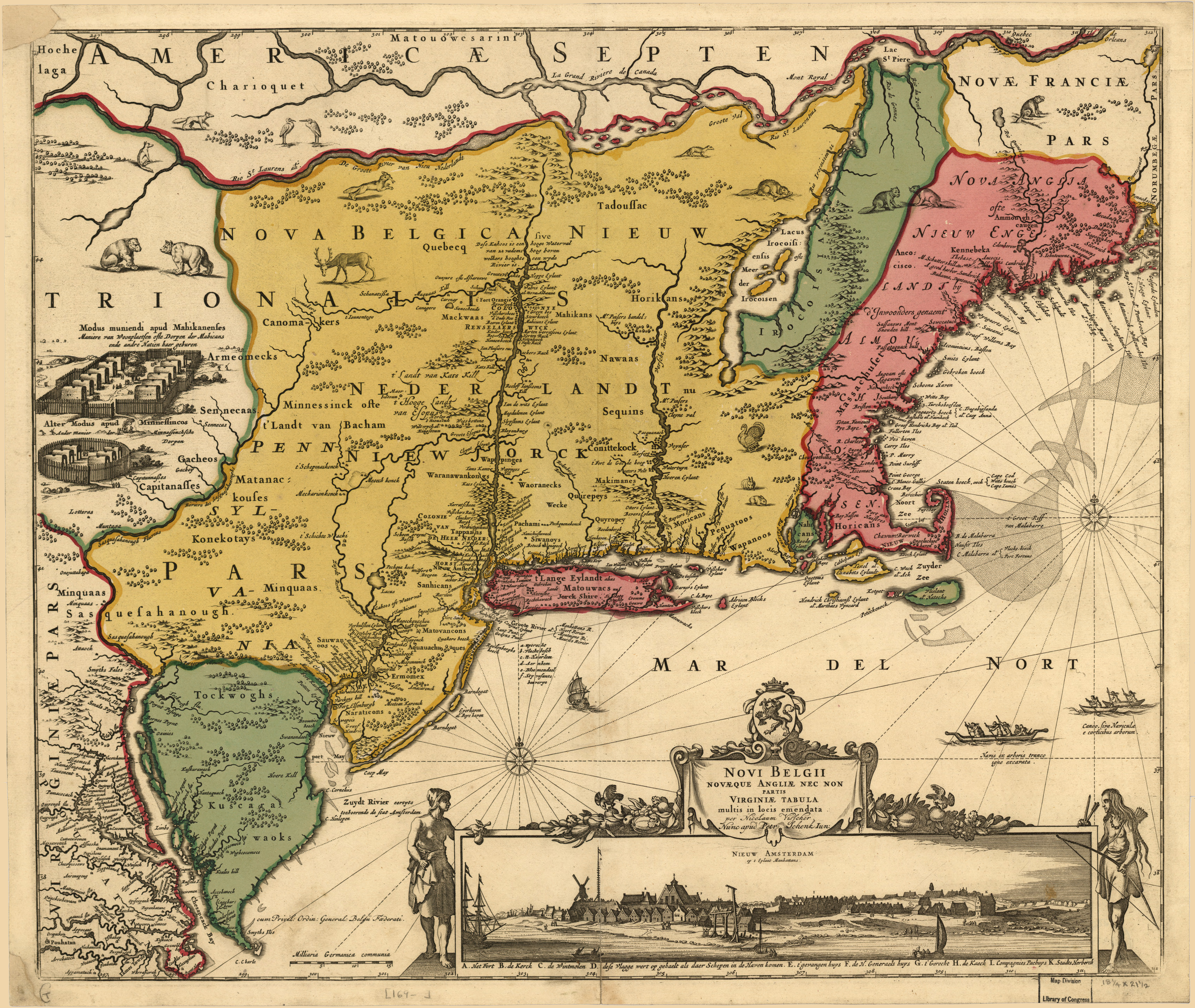
A 1685 reprint of the 1650 map Novi Belgii Novæque Angliæ showing Virginia, New Netherland, and New England.

New Netherland (Dutch: Nieuw-Nederland) was the 17th-century colonial province of the Republic of the Seven United Netherlands and the Dutch West India Company. It claimed territories along the eastern coast of North America from the Delmarva Peninsula to southwestern Cape Cod. Settled areas of New Netherland are now constitute the states of New York, New Jersey, Delaware, and Connecticut, and parts of Pennsylvania and Rhode Island. The provincial capital New Amsterdam was located at the southern tip of the island of Manhattan at Upper New York Bay.

New Netherland was conceived as a private business venture to exploit the North American fur trade. By the 1650s, the colony experienced dramatic growth and became a major port for trade in the North Atlantic. The leader of the Dutch colony was known by the title Director or Director-General. On August 27, 1664, four English frigates commanded by Richard Nicolls sailed into New Amsterdam's harbor and demanded the surrender of New Netherland. This event sparked the Second Anglo-Dutch War, which led to the transfer of the territory to England per the Treaty of Breda.

#	Portrait	Director (or Director-General)	Took office	Left office	Notes
1		Cornelius Jacobsen May (fl. 1600s)	1624	1625	Explored Delaware Bay, New York Bay, Hudson River.; Established base at Nut Island (Noten Eylant) and outposts including Fort Nassau on Delaware River.; Cape May was named in his honor.
2		Willem Verhulst (or van der Hulst) (fl. 1600s)	1625	1626	Initiated construction of Fort Amsterdam on southern tip of Manhattan Island, and Fort Wilhelmus on the Delaware River.; Unpopular with the colonists, he was quickly replaced.
3	Portrait of Peter Minuit	Peter Minuit (1580–1638)	1626	1631	Purchased the island of Manhattan from Native Americans on May 24, 1626 for 60 Dutch guilders worth of goods.
4		Sebastiaen Jansen Krol (1595–1674)	1632	1633	Commander at Fort Orange (New Netherland) before and after his term as Director General
5	portrait of Wouter van Twiller by Washington Allston	Wouter van Twiller (1606–1654)	1633	1638	Previously a Dutch West India Company warehouse clerk, used family connections to the Rensselaer family to gain appointment; Purchased Nut Island (Noten Eylant), later called Governor's Island from Canarsee tribe for two axeheads, a string of beads and iron nails; Lost the colony's claim of the Connecticut River valley to New England settlers; Pushed back encroaching Virginia settlers who tried to settle Delaware River valley
6	portrait of Willem Kieft	Willem Kieft (1597–1647)	1638	1647	Attempted to drive out Lenape tribe.; Attacks on Pavonia and Corlears Hook, led to Kieft's War.; Fired by the Dutch West India Company in 1647.; Died at sea near Swansea, Wales on September 27, 1647 while returning to Amsterdam aboard the Princess Amelia.
7	Portrait of Peter Stuyvesant	Peter Stuyvesant (c. 1612–1672) (Director General)	1647	1664	Authorized charter for Communipaw and Bergen (now Jersey City) in 1660.; New Amsterdam, Pavonia, and Staten Island attacked by the Lenape during the brief Peach War (1655); Obtained victory the Esopus Wars against the Lenape and Esopus tribes; Surrendered New Netherland to the British.; Also the Director of Curaçao (1642–1664)

=== Restoration of the colony, 1673–1674 ===
In 1673, during the Third Anglo-Dutch War, the Dutch were able to recapture New Amsterdam (renamed "New York" by the British) under Admiral Cornelis Evertsen the Youngest and Captain Anthony Colve. Evertsen renamed the city "New Orange." Evertsen returned to the Netherlands in July 1674, and was accused of disobeying his orders. Evertsen had been instructed not to retake New Amsterdam but instead to conquer the British colonies of Saint Helena and Cayenne (now French Guiana). In 1674, the Dutch were compelled to relinquish New Amsterdam to the British under the terms of the Second Treaty of Westminster.

Portrait	Governor	Took office	Left office	Notes
	Anthony Colve (fl. 1600s)	1673	1674	Colve's authority was brief, starting with the taking of New York, but ended on February 9, 1674 with the signing of the Treaty of Westminster, which restored the colony to the English. News did not reach the New World of the treaty's terms until late in the year.

== Under British control (1664–1673; 1674–1783) ==
Apart from a short period between May 1688 and April 1689, during which New York was part of the Dominion of New England, the territory was known in this period as the Province of New York.

#	Portrait	Governor	Took office	Left office	Notes
1		Richard Nicolls (1624–1672)	1664	1668	as military governor
2		Francis Lovelace (1621–1675)	1668	1673	
3		Anthony Colve (Dutch Governor)	1673	1674	Dutch former naval captain who became Governor under a restored Dutch rule
4		Edmund Andros (1637–1714)	1674	1683	
5		Anthony Brockholls (c. 1656)	1681	1683	Commander-in-Chief of British Forces and acting governor
6		Thomas Dongan, 2nd Earl of Limerick (1634–1715)	1683	1688	
7		Francis Nicholson (1655–1728)	1688	1691	as lieutenant governor of the Dominion of New England serving under Edmund Andros; de facto rule only until June 1689
8		Jacob Leisler (c. 1640–1691)	1688	1691	Militia officer in rebellion
9		Henry Sloughter (d. 1691)	1691	1691	
10		Richard Ingoldesby (d. 1719)	1691	1692	Military officer as acting governor
11		Benjamin Fletcher (1640–1703)	1692	1697	
12		Richard Coote, 1st Earl of Bellomont (c. 1636–1701)	1698	1701	Died on March 5, which was 1700 Julian but 1701 Gregorian.
13		John Nanfan (1634–1716)	1701	1702	as acting governor
14		Edward Hyde, 3rd Earl of Clarendon (1661–1723)	1702	1708	
15		John Lovelace, 4th Baron Lovelace (1672–1709)	1708	1709	
16		Pieter Schuyler (1657–1724)	1709	1709	as acting governor
17		Richard Ingoldesby (d. 1719)	1709	1710	as acting governor
18		Gerardus Beekman (1653–1723)	1710	1710	as acting governor
19		Robert Hunter (1664–1734)	1710	1719	
20		Pieter Schuyler (1657–1724)	1719	1720	as acting governor
21		William Burnet (1687/8–1729)	1720	1728	
22		John Montgomerie (d. 1731)	1728	1731	
23		Rip Van Dam (c. 1660–1749)	1731	1732	as acting governor
24		William Cosby (1690–1736)	1732	1736	
25		George Clarke (1676–1760)	1736	1743	as acting governor
26		George Clinton (c. 1686–1761)	1743	1753	
27		Sir Danvers Osborn, 3rd Baronet (1715–1753)	1753	1753	
28		James De Lancey (1703–1760)	1753	1755	as acting governor
29		Charles Hardy (c. 1714–1780)	1755	1758	
30		James De Lancey (1703–1760)	1758	1760	as acting governor
31		Cadwallader Colden (1688–1776)	1760	1762	as acting governor
32		Robert Monckton (1726–1782)	1762	1763	
33		Cadwallader Colden (1688–1776)	1763	1765	as acting governor
34		Sir Henry Moore, 1st Baronet (1713–1769)	1765	1769	
35		Cadwallader Colden (1688–1776)	1769	1770	as acting governor
36		John Murray, 4th Earl of Dunmore (1730–1809)	1770	1771	
37		William Tryon (1729–1788)	1771	1774	
38		Cadwallader Colden (1688–1776)	1774	1775	as acting governor
39		William Tryon (1729–1788)	1775	1780	
40		James Robertson (1717–1788)	1780	1783	as military governor
41		Andrew Elliot (1728–1797)	1783	1783	as military governor

== See also ==
- For a list of governors of New York state after independence (1777–present), see: List of governors of New York.
- Director-General of New Netherland, for a list of the Governors of New Netherland from 1624 to 1664.
- List of colonial governors of New Jersey

== Bibliography ==
- Paterson, David "Black, Blind, & In Charge: A Story of Visionary Leadership and Overcoming Adversity."Skyhorse Publishing. New York, New York, 2020
