= George Clarke (governor) =

British colonial administrator and landowner (1676–1760)

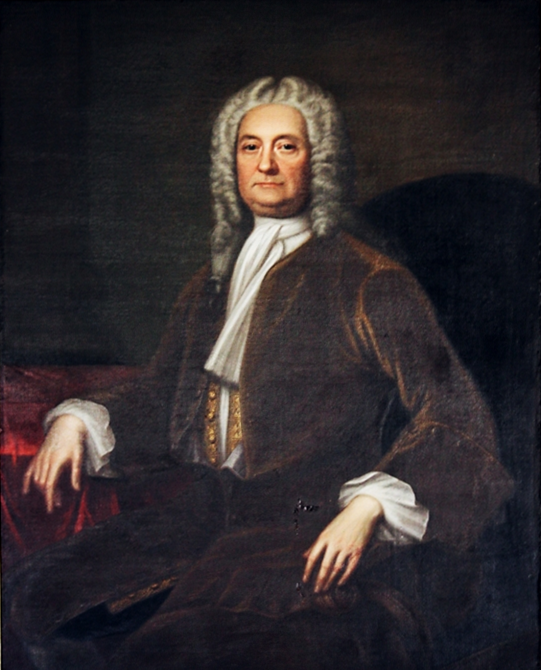

Governor of New York (acting)
- In office 1736–1747
- Monarch: George II
- Preceding: William Cosby
- Succeeded by: George Clinton

Personal details
- Born: 1676 England
- Died: 12 January 1760 (aged 83–84) Hyde Hall, Cheshire

George Clarke (1676 – 12 January 1760) was a British colonial administrator and landowner who served as the acting governor of New York from 1736 to 1743.

== Biography ==
Coat of Arms of George Clarke

He was also known as George Clarke of Hyde, after he purchased Hyde Hall in Cheshire, the ancestral home of his wife, Anne Hyde, in the 1740s. He became Secretary of the Province of New York in 1703. Along with his wife he purchased land in 1715 in Hempstead, Long Island, New York, and built an estate called Hyde Park. He became acting colonial governor of New York in 1736 following the death of William Cosby, serving until George Clinton arrived in 1743 to replace Cosby. Clarke then held the post of Lieutenant Governor until 1747.

In 1741, Clarke was marginally involved in the suppression of the New York Conspiracy of 1741, a plot much-disputed by historians on the part of African slaves and poor white settlers to overthrow the colonial government by setting fires in New York City in March 1741.

On his return journey to England, with the fortune he had amassed in America, he was captured by a French Navy cruiser ship. After a short time he was released. He died in Chester, England, on 12 January 1760, aged 84. He is buried in Chester Cathedral, where there is a monument to him.

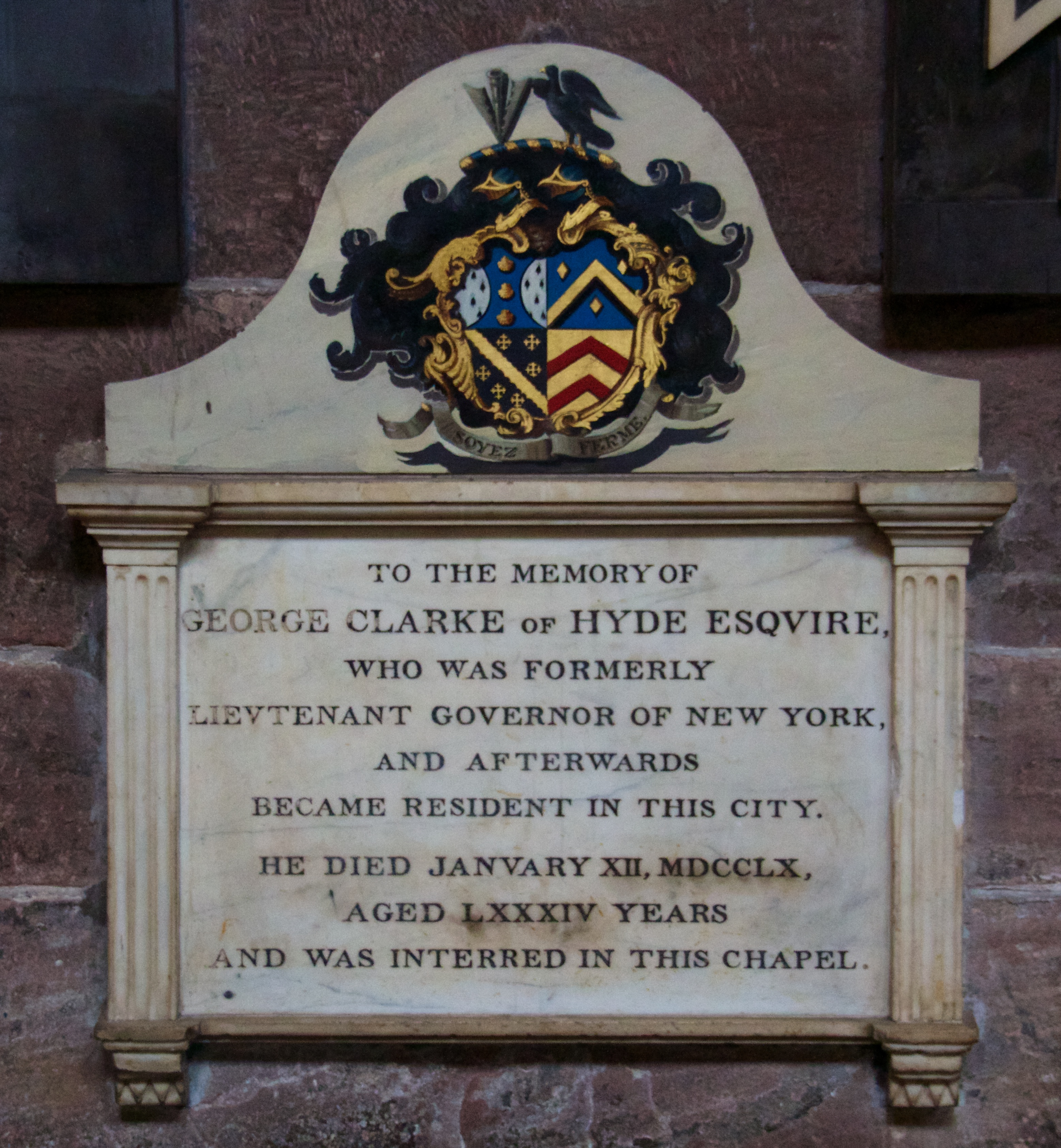
Monument to George Clarke in Chester Cathedral, England

Clarke was the nephew of British administrator William Blathwayt.

The British athlete and politician Sebastian Coe is descended from George Clarke, who was his seven-times-great-grandfather, via a son who lived in Jamaica.

Government offices
Preceded by William Cosby	Governor of the Province of New York (acting); 1736–1743	Succeeded by George Clinton
