= Philipstown, New York =

- Town
- Town of Philipstown
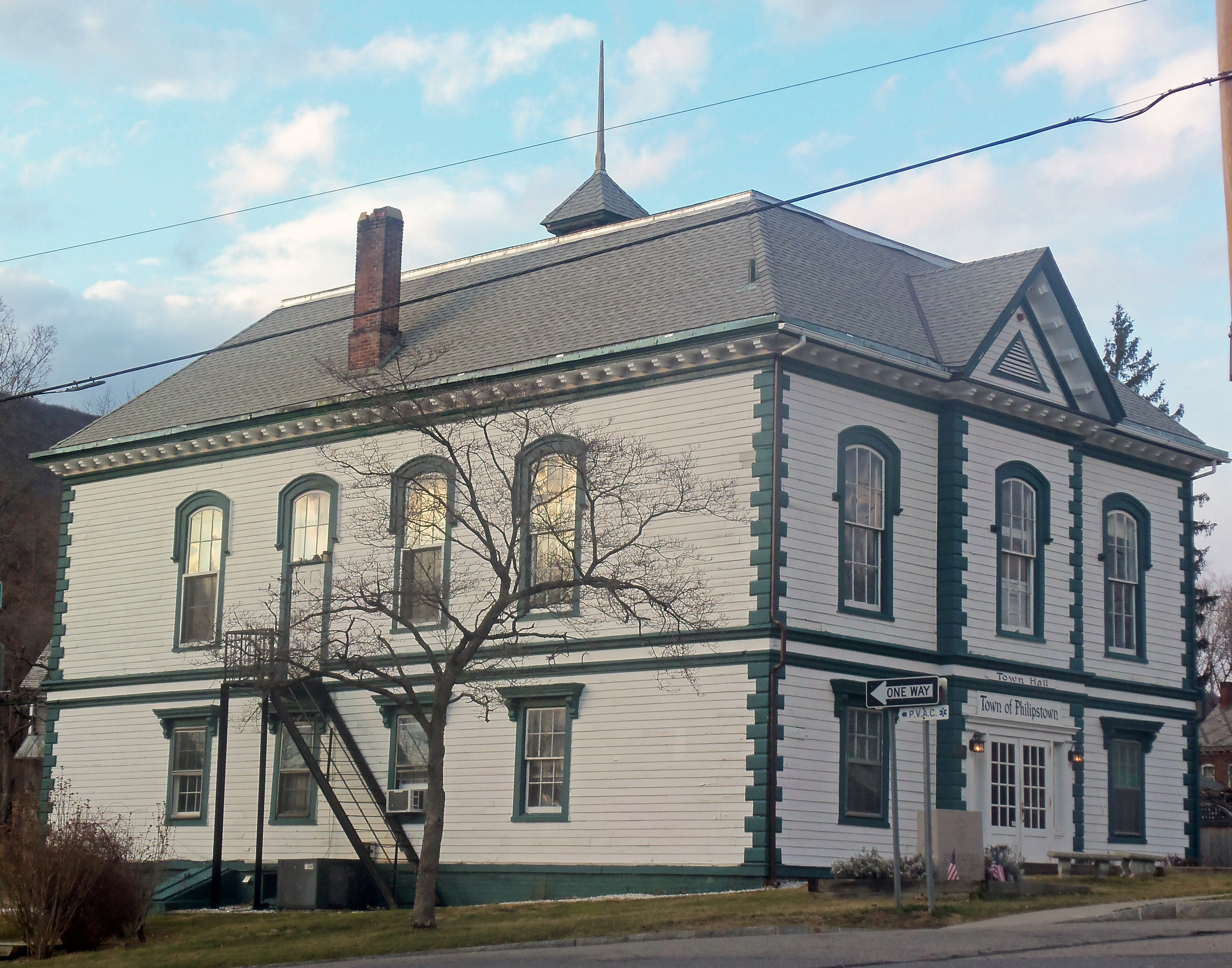
- Town hall

- Seal
- Etymology: Early local landowners, the Philipse family
- Location of Philipstown, New York

- Location of New York in the United States
- Coordinates: 41°25′22″N 73°57′2″W
- Country: United States
- State: New York
- County: Putnam
- Founded: 1788

Government
  - Town supervisor: John Van Tassel

Area
  - Total: 51.55 sq mi (133.52 km^{2})
  - Land: 48.77 sq mi (126.32 km^{2})
  - Water: 2.78 sq mi (7.20 km^{2})
- Elevation: 200 ft (61 m)
- Lowest elevation: 0 ft (0 m)

Population (2020)
  - Total: 9,831
  - Density: 201.6/sq mi (77.82/km^{2})
- Time zone: UTC-5
  - Summer (DST): UTC-4 (Eastern Daylight Time)
- ZIP code: 10516 and 10524
- Area code: 845
- FIPS code: 36-079-57584
- FIPS code: 36-57584
- GNIS feature ID: 0979363
- Wikimedia Commons: Philipstown, New York
- Website: Town of Philipstown

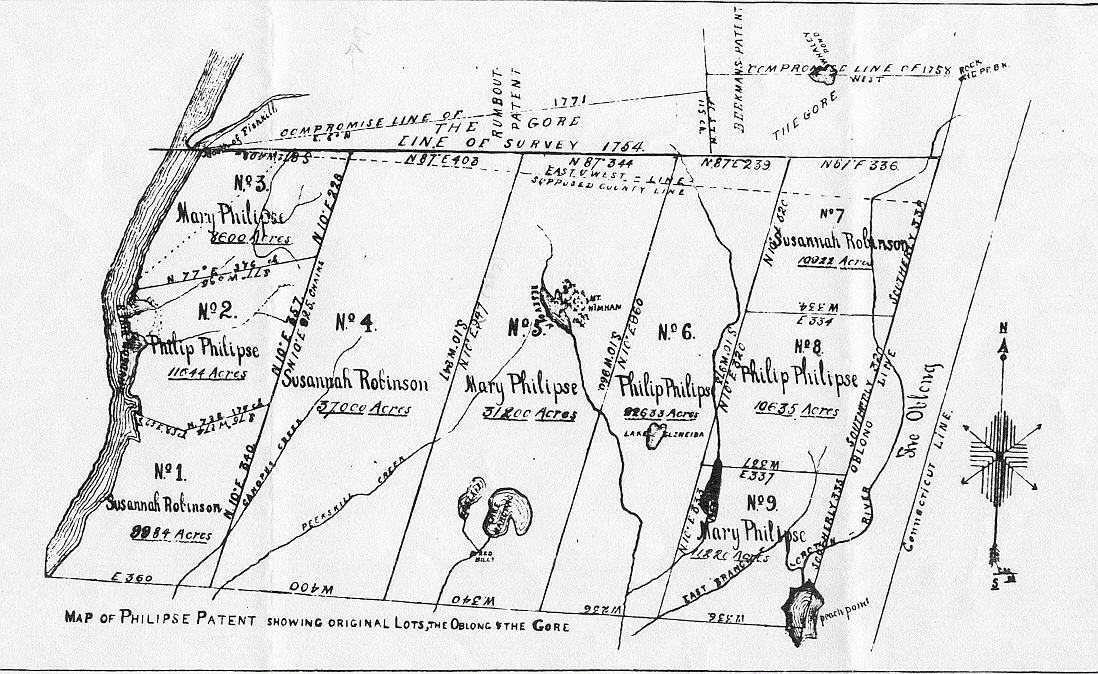
Map of the Philipse Patent showing the holdings of Philip Philipse, Susanna Philipse, and Mary Philipse

Philipstown is a town located in the western part of Putnam County, New York, United States. The population was 9,831 at the 2020 census.

== History ==
In 1697 Adolphus Philipse, a wealthy Province of New York landowner and merchant, purchased a tract from Dutch traders which received British Royal sanction as the Highland Patent. Comprising roughly 250 square miles, it extended approximately 13 miles along the eastern shore of the Hudson River, from Annsville Creek to the Fishkill Creek, and eastward some 20 or so miles to the border of the Colony of Connecticut.

Philipstown was first settled in the westernmost of this parcel circa 1715. In 1754 the Highland Patent, subsequently known as the Philipse Patent, was divided among Philipse heirs into nine parcels. In 1788, Philipstown was established out of the three river lots and part of a fourth inland to the north, becoming one of the three original towns in what is now Putnam County. In 1806 a very small portion north of the Hudson Highlands by the mouth of Fishkill Creek was split off from Philipstown and given to the Town of Fishkill.

Philipstown's main population centers are the village of Cold Spring, the hamlet of Garrison, and the village of Nelsonville. In 1806, part of the town was used to form the town of Fishkill. Putnam Valley was part of Philipstown until 1839, and a small portion of the town north of Putnam Valley was transferred to Kent in 1877.

== Geography ==
According to the United States Census Bureau, the town has a total area of 51.6 square miles (134 km^{2}), of which 48.8 square miles (126 km^{2}) is land and 2.8 square miles (7.3 km^{2}), or 5.39%, is water.

The western border of Philipstown is the Hudson River, with the Orange County towns of Highlands and Cornwall, as well as a small sliver of Stony Point in Rockland County, on the opposite shore. The northern town line borders the Dutchess County towns of Fishkill and East Fishkill, with the southern town boundary bordering the Westchester County town of Cortlandt. Kent and Putnam Valley border the town on its eastern side.

== Media ==
Philipstown has two weekly newspapers: The Highlands Current, founded in 2010 and published on Friday, and the Putnam County News & Recorder, founded in 1868 and published on Wednesday.

== Demographics ==
Historical population
Census	Pop.	Note	%±
1820	3,733		—
1830	4,816		29.0%
1840	3,814		−20.8%
1850	5,063		32.7%
1860	4,526		−10.6%
1870	5,117		13.1%
1880	4,375		−14.5%
1890	4,113		−6.0%
1900	4,642		12.9%
1910	5,345		15.1%
1920	3,272		−38.8%
1930	3,982		21.7%
1940	4,246		6.6%
1950	4,332		2.0%
1960	5,918		36.6%
1970	7,717		30.4%
1980	9,155		18.6%
1990	9,242		1.0%
2000	9,422		1.9%
2010	9,662		2.5%
2020	9,831		1.7%
U.S. Decennial Census

As of the census of 2010, there were 9,662 people, 3,685 households, and 2,591 families residing in the town. The population density was 198.0 inhabitants per square mile (76.4/km^{2}). There were 4,164 housing units at an average density of 85.3 units per square mile (32.9 units/km^{2}). The racial makeup of the town was 93.1% White, 1.6% African American, 0.2% Native American, 1.4% Asian, 1.6% from other races, and 2.0% from two or more races. Hispanic or Latino of any race were 6.9% of the population.

There were 3,685 households, out of which 31.4% had children under the age of 18 living with them, 58.2% were married couples living together, 8.5% had a female householder with no husband present, and 29.7% were non-families. 23.9% of all households were made up of individuals, and 9.9% had someone living alone who was 65 years of age or older. The average household size was 2.53 and the average family size was 3.02.

In the town, the population was spread out, with 28.1% under the age of 20, 3.8% from 20 to 24, 21.3% from 25 to 44, 35.3% from 45 to 64, and 15.5% who were 65 years of age or older. The median age was 41 years. For every 100 females, there were 95.7 males. For every 100 females age 18 and over, there were 94.9 males.

As of 2016, the median income for a household in the town was $102,097, and the median income for a family was $127,034. Males had a median income of $84,313 versus $64,348 for females. The per capita income for the town was $52,755. About 5.3% of the population were below the poverty line, including 3.9% of those under age 18 and 4.3 of those age 65 or over.

== Government and emergency services ==
Philipstown is governed by a town board. The town hall is located at 238 Main Street (New York State Route 301) in Cold Spring, New York. Primary law enforcement services in Philipstown are provided by the New York State Police and the Putnam County Sheriff's Department. The village of Cold Spring has its own police department. Fire and medical emergency services are provided by the Continental Village Fire Department, the Garrison Fire Department, the North Highlands Fire Department, and the Village of Cold Spring Fire Department.

== Communities and locations in Philipstown ==
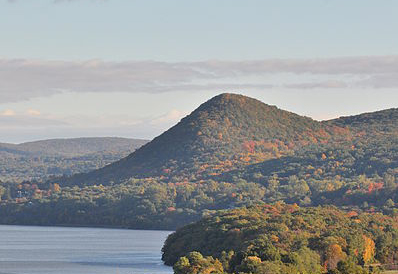
The Hudson Highlands in Philipstown are one of Putnam County's top scenic features

- Cold Spring – the village of Cold Spring is by the Hudson River.
- Constitution Island – location by the Hudson River.
- Continental Village – hamlet in the southeastern part of the town.
- Clarence Fahnestock State Park – state park in the northeastern section of the town.
- Fahnestock Corners – locale
- Forsonville – hamlet in the southern part of the town, southeast of Garrison.
- Garrison – hamlet by the Hudson River.
- Garrison Four Corners – location southeast of Garrison.
- Glenclyffe – hamlet near the Hudson River.
- Graymoor – hamlet in the southeastern part of the town.
- Hudson Highlands State Park – state park in the southwestern part of the town.
- Manitou – hamlet in the southwestern corner of the town, by the Hudson River.
- Mekeel Corners – locale
- Nelsonville – village northeast of Cold Spring.
- North Highlands – hamlet northeast of Nelsonville.
- South Highland – hamlet by the eastern town line.
- Travis Corners – a locale east of South Highland.

== See also ==
- Hudson Highlands Multiple Resource Area
- Philipsburg Manor
- The Oblong
