= North Highlands, New York =

- Hamlet
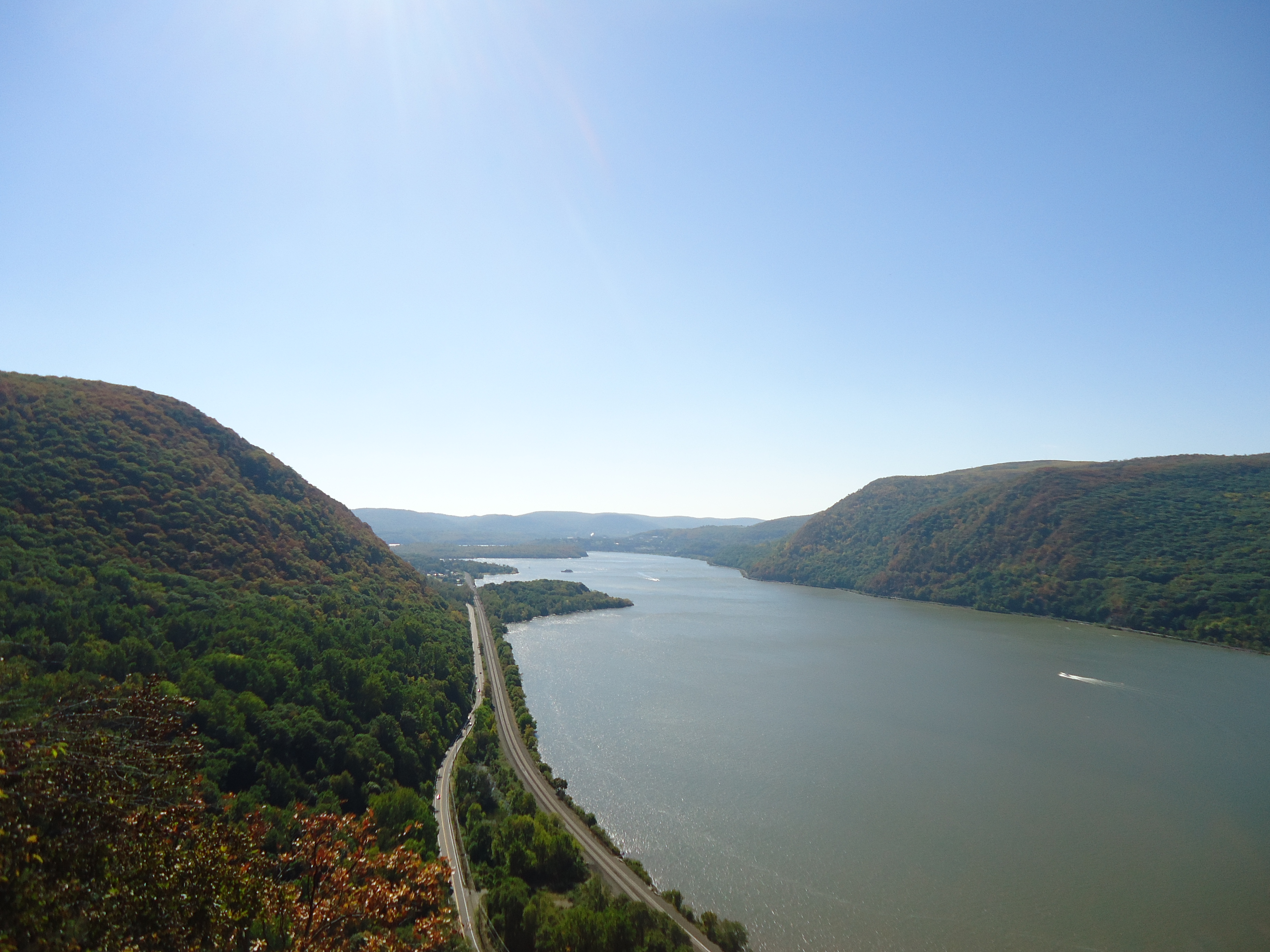
- View south from Breakneck Ridge in North Highlands
- Coordinates: 41°27′40″N 73°55′00″W
- Country: United States
- State: New York
- County: Putnam
- Town: Philipstown
- Elevation: 417 ft (127 m)

Population (2020)
  - Total: 2,356 (Note: Hamlets do not have definitive boundaries, this number reflects the portion of Philipstown north of Cold Spring, Nelsonville, and Route 301 coextensive with the North Highlands Fire District.)
- Time zone: UTC-5 (Eastern (EST))
  - Summer (DST): UTC-4 (EDT)
- ZIP code: 10516
- Area code: 845
- GNIS feature ID: 942492

North Highlands (sometimes referred to as North Highland, or Davenport's Corners historically) is a hamlet in Putnam County, New York which consists of the northernmost portions of Philipstown in the Hudson Highlands. Like the adjacent village of Nelsonville, it shares a ZIP Code and school district with nearby Cold Spring.

== History ==
North Highlands was part of the Philipse Patent, a royal patent granted to Adolphus Philipse in 1697. Upon his son's death in 1751, much of what is now North Highlands was inherited by his daughter Mary Philipse who was a Loyalist during the American Revolution and had her land confiscated by the state.

One of the earliest homes in the area was that of David Hustis built in 1730.

North Highlands Cemetery is located along Route 9 and has gravestones dating from the early 1800s to the present day.

There was a schoolhouse in the area in the 1920s.

The North Highlands Fire Organizing Committee was founded in 1968 and eventually lead to the creation of the North Highlands Fire District. The first firehouse was completed in 1972 on land donated by the local KCOR radio station and a new building was constructed in the early 2010s on the same location.

== Geography ==
The area is bordered to the west by the Hudson River and contains several mountains of the Hudson Highlands, most notably Bull Hill and the Putnam County portion of Breakneck Ridge.

== Government and schools ==
North Highlands is governed by the town board of Philipstown and is part of the Haldane Central School District. The North Highlands Fire Department is located in the hamlet. Local law enforcement includes new New York State Police and Putnam County Sheriff's Department.
