= Frederick Philipse Robinson =

British Army officer

General Sir Frederick Philipse Robinson GCB
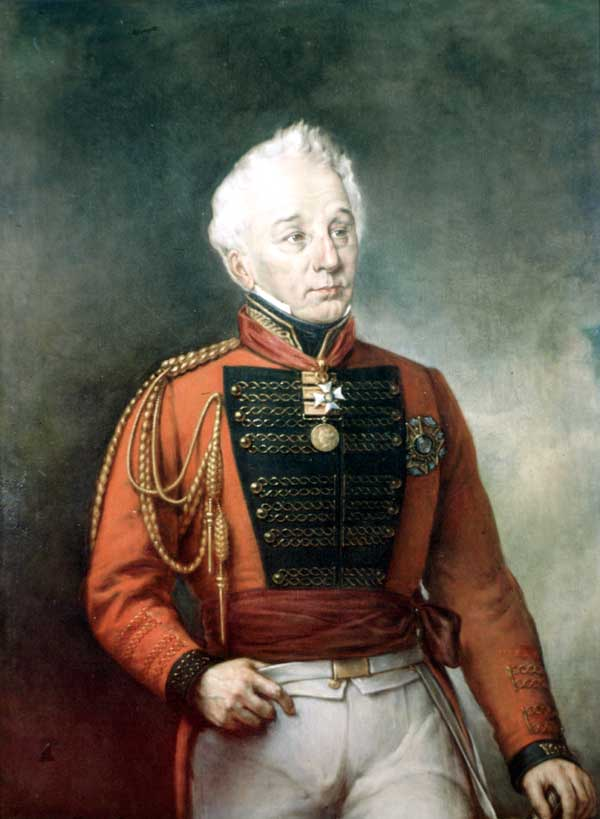
- Portrait by George Theodore Berthon
- Born: September 1763; Highlands, New York
- Died: 1 January 1852 (aged 88); Brighton, England
- Burial place: Parish Church, Hove, England
- Children: 4
- Relatives: Beverley Robinson (father); Susannah Philipse (mother)
- Military career
- Allegiance: United Kingdom
- Branch: British Army
- Service years: 1777–1852
- Rank: General
- Units: Various regiments
- Commands: Inspecting Field Officer, Bedford; Inspecting Field Officer, London; Brigade, 5th Division; 5th Division; 4th Brigade, America; Lieutenant-Governor of Upper Canada; Governor of Tobago
- Conflicts: American Revolutionary War; Battle of Horseneck; Battle of Stony Point (WIA) (POW); Battle of Groton Heights; French Revolutionary Wars; West Indies Campaign; Battle of Martinique; Invasion of Guadeloupe; Napoleonic Wars; Peninsular Wars; Battle of Vitoria (WIA); Siege of San Sebastián (WIA); Battle of the Bidassoa; Battle of Nivelle; Battle of Nive (WIA); Battle of Bayonne; War of 1812; Battle of Plattsburgh
- Awards: Army Gold Medal

General Sir Frederick Philipse Robinson, GCB (September 1763 – 1 January 1852) was a British Army officer who served in the American War of Independence and the Napoleonic Wars. His father, Colonel Beverley Robinson, was a Virginian who moved to New York, marrying a wealthy heiress of the Philipse family with Dutch and Bohemian ancestry, Susanna Philipse. Frederick was born in the Hudson Highlands on the family estate in the Philipse Patent, today's Putnam County, New York, in September 1763.

On the conclusion of peace he went to England. In 1813 and 1814 he commanded a brigade under the Duke of Wellington in Spain. He subsequently took part in the War of 1812 with the United States, leading troops during the unsuccessful Plattsburgh campaign. He was a provisional Lieutenant-Governor of Upper Canada in 1815. Afterwards he was governor of Tobago, and he became a general in 1841. In time he became the oldest soldier in the British service, and died at Brighton, England, at the age of 88.

== Ancestry ==
He was the fourth son of Colonel Beverley Robinson, son of John Robinson, President of the Council at Virginia, North America. The Robinsons were, in property and family, among the leading men in that province. John Robinson was nephew to Dr. John Robinson, Bishop of London, and went to America as secretary to government. He resided at Williamsburg and married Catherine Beverley, daughter of Robert Beverley, Esq., of Beverley, Yorkshire.

Dr. John Robinson, Bishop of London, was distinguished both as a statesman and a divine. He was ambassador to the court of Sweden during the years 1683 to 1708. In the year 1710 he was made Bishop of Bristol, in the following year Lord Privy Seal. In 1712 he was first plenipotentiary at the Treaty of Utrecht, and soon after his return was translated to the See of London. He lies buried in the churchyard at Fulham.

Colonel Beverley Robinson arrived in New York from Virginia in 1745 as captain of an independent company, raised before leaving for the purpose of defending the frontier against the Indians, which company was disbanded in 1748. He soon afterward married Susannah Philipse, daughter of Frederick Philipse, second Lord of Philipsburg Manor, with whom he obtained large pieces of property in New York as his wife's share of the Philipse Patent. As all Philipses were Loyal to the Crown during the American Revolution, the Beverlys holdings were seized in 1779 by the Revolutionary government of the Province of New York and were never compensated for their loss. Colonel Robinson died at Bath in March 1792 leaving a numerous family.

== America ==
At the earliest commencement of the American war Colonel Beverley Robinson raised the Loyal American Regiment, which performed signal service to the royal cause until the peace in 1783. In this regiment young Frederick Philipse Robinson received an ensigncy in February 1777, and on 1 September 1778 he was appointed to the 17th Foot, which he joined in October following. In March, 1779, he commanded a company, in the absence of his captain, at the Battle of Horseneck, under General William Tryon. In July, 1779, being in garrison at the post of Stony Point on the Hudson River, the place was stormed at midnight by a strong force of the Americans under General Anthony Wayne, and after a sharp and close conflict of more than an hour, during which the young ensign was wounded in the shoulder by a musket ball, he found himself a prisoner of war. Whilst detained as such at Lancaster, Pennsylvania, he was promoted to be Lieutenant in the 60th Foot on 1 September 1779, and transferred to the 38th Foot on 4 November 1781. Upon being released by order of General George Washington, said to have been a childhood friend of his father in Virginia, joined that regiment the end of November at Brooklyn, New York. The year 1783, which gave peace to Europe and America, destroyed the hopes of the American loyalists. They were involved in one general proscription, and obliged to abandon their property, which had been declared forfeited in 1779 for their attachment to the royal cause. The evacuation of New York took place in 1783—the 38th formed one of the six regiments which remained until the final embarkation, and arrived at Portsmouth January 1784. In spite of a provision in the Treaty of Paris ending the conflict requiring those whose property was attained by the Colonial government to be compensated for their losses none was ever forthcoming to the Robinsons or other heirs of the Philipse estates.

== West Indies ==
After serving in England and Ireland during the following nine years, Lieut. Robinson embarked with his regiment at Cork on 24 November 1793, forming part of Sir Charles Grey's expedition to the West Indies. He was present at the capture of Martinique, St. Lucia, and Guadeloupe, including the storming of Fleur-de-l'Épée, and the heights of Palmonte. He was promoted to a company, 3 July 1794, and commanded the Grenadiers until after the capture of Guadeloupe, when, his health having suffered severely from the climate, he returned to England on sick certificate.

== Bedford and London ==
On 1 September 1794, Capt. Robinson was gazetted Major of the 127th Foot, and removed to the 32nd Foot 1 September 1795. Some time afterwards he was appointed Inspecting Field Officer at Bedford, received the rank of Lieut.-Colonel in the Army 1 January 1800, and the command of the London Recruiting District, in February 1809. He was actively employed in organising and drilling the Volunteers in the metropolis. In December 1803, the Bank of England Supplementary Volunteer Corp presented Lieut.-Colonel Robinson with a splendid piece of plate, "as a testimony of their respect and esteem, and the high sense they entertain of his great attention in bringing them to their present state of discipline."

By 1807, the then Col. Robinson had commanded London Recruiting District, and the Pimlico battalion of the Queen's Loyal Volunteers from about 1803. Robinson was posted to London from Bedford, c 1801. On Friday 8 May 1807, he addressed a meeting at Covent Garden, London where he introduced Col. Eliot to the meeting, as the prospective parliamentary candidate for Westminster in the 1807 United Kingdom general election.

== Peninsula ==
On 25 July 1810, he became Colonel in the army, and having from the commencement of the war in the Peninsula most earnestly desired permission to serve with the force under Wellington, his request was at length granted, and in September 1812, Colonel Robinson joined the army in Spain as a Brigadier-General. On 4 June 1813, he became a Major-General. No opportunity occurred of distinguishing himself until the action at Osona on 18 June 1813, on which occasion his conduct was especially noticed. On 21 June, the memorable battle of Vittoria took place, in which General Robinson commanded the brigade which carried the village of Gamarra-Mayor at the point of the bayonet under a heavy fire of artillery and musketry, repulsing the numerous desperate efforts of the enemy to recover it. Sir Thomas Graham (Lord Lynedoch), in his order thanking the column, states:

"The attack of the village of Gamarra by Major-General Robinson's brigade was justly admired by all who witnessed it. Too much praise cannot be given to Major-General Robinson and the troops of his brigade for their persevering defence of a post so gallantly won, against numerous artillery and great masses of infantry, the enemy employed to retake it, in repeated attacks."

On 21 July 1813, General Robinson took part in the first assault of St. Sebastian, and on 31 August he commanded the attacking column at the second and successful assault, and was severely wounded. On 7 October following, the Major-General was at the head of the leading column at the passage of the Bidassoa; on 9 November was at the attack of Secoa and the Heights of Cibour; on 10 December, at the battle of the Nive, was again severely wounded. He recovered to take part in the operations at the blockade of Bayonne and the repulse of the sortie on 14 April 1814, when he succeeded to the command of the fifth division.

== Canada, War of 1812 ==
In June 1814, the Duke of Wellington selected General Robinson to proceed in command of a brigade to North America, and he accordingly embarked at Bordeaux with battalions of the 27th, 39th, 76th, and 88th regiments, and arrived at Brandypots, 100 miles below Quebec, on 9 August 1814. In September he commanded two brigades intended to attack the works of Plattsburg during the War of 1812, but after having gallantly forced the passage of the Saranac, received orders from Sir George Prevost to retire. In November following, he was appointed Commander-in-Chief and Provisional Governor of the Upper Provinces in Canada, which he held until June, 1816, when he returned to England.

== Tobago ==
He afterwards became Governor and Commander-in-Chief of Tobago from 1816 to 1828, "fulfilling the duties to the entire satisfaction of the home government and the inhabitants of the colony" although from all appearances, this was a "flat statement in which even his own defense exposes as being uncharacteristically flawed.

== Personal life ==
On 2 January 1815, General Robinson was nominated a Knight Commander of the Order of the Bath, and he was advanced to be a Grand Cross in 1838. He attained the rank of Lieut.-General 27 May 1825, and that of General 23 November 1841; and was appointed to the command of the 39th regiment on 15 June 1840. Sir Frederick Philipse Robinson lived to become the oldest soldier in the British service, his first commission being of earlier date than those of the few general officers whose names preceded his in the Army List. For the last seven years he resided at Brighton, Sussex, in the possession of good health and in the exercise of all his mental faculties, enjoying the affectionate attendance of a beloved daughter and niece, and the society of an attached circle of friends, to whom be had endeared himself by his noble and amiable qualities. He died after a very few days illness on the first day of 1852, and on 7 January his honoured remains were consigned to their last resting-place in the churchyard of Hove, near Brighton.

Sir Frederick was twice married:

Firstly, c. early 1790s, to Grace Boles, daughter of Thomas Boles, Esq., of Charleville, who died in 1806, with issue including:

- Maria Susan Robinson (born 18 November 1793, bapt 1 December 1802 St Peter, Bedford)
- Frederick Philipse Robinson (born 20 January 1797, bapt 1 December 1802 St Peter Bedford)
- Beverley George Robinson (born 31 January 1799, bapt 1 December 1802 St Peter, Bedford)
- Jane Robinson (born 28 January 1802, bapt 1 December 1802 St Peter, Bedford)

Secondly, in 1811, to Ann Fernyhough, of Stafford, who died at Tobago.

Military offices
Preceded by Alexander Ross	Colonel of the 59th (2nd Nottinghamshire) Regiment of Foot; 1827–1840	Succeeded by Sir Robert Lawrence Dundas
Preceded by Sir Robert William O'Callaghan	Colonel of the 39th (Dorsetshire) Regiment of Foot; 1840–1852	Succeeded by George Burrell
Government offices
Preceded by Sir George Murray	Lieutenant-Governor of Ontario; 1815	Succeeded by Francis Gore
Preceded by John Campbell	Governor of Tobago; 1816–1828	Succeeded by Nathaniel Blackwell
