= Susanna Philipse =

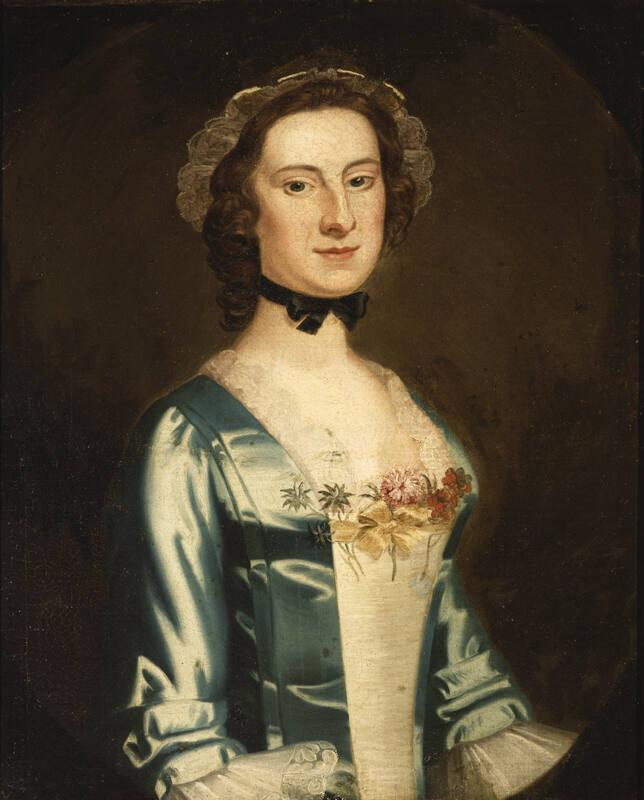
c. 1750 portrait of Philipse by John Wollaston

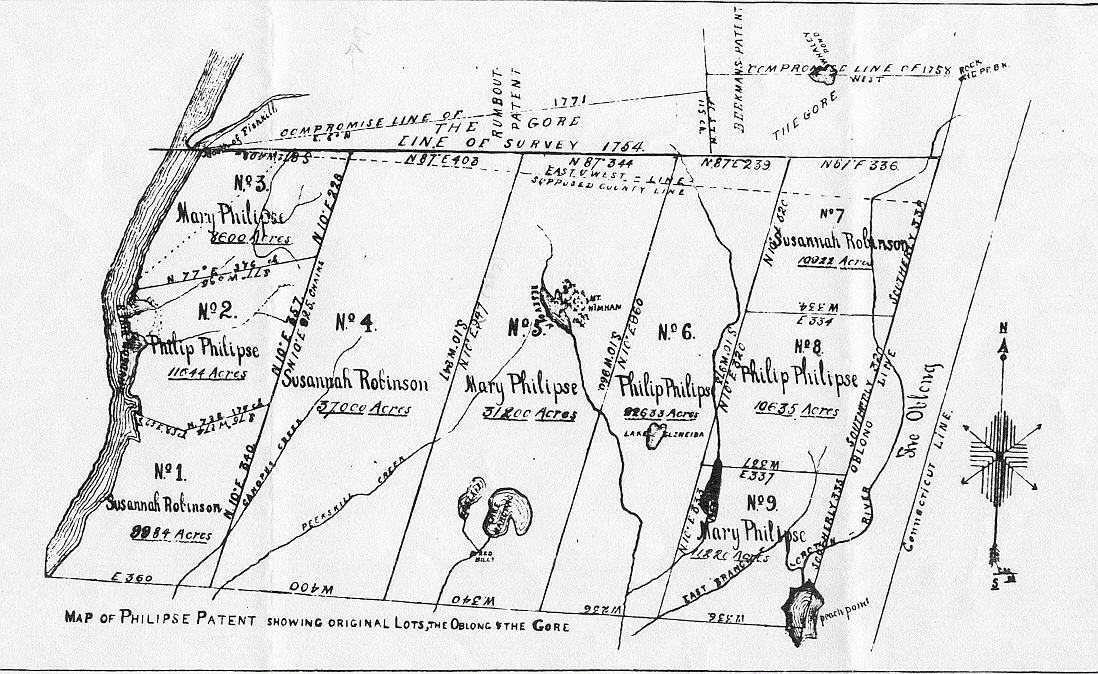
Map of the Philipse Patent showing the holdings of Philip, Susanna, and Mary Philipse

Susanna Philipse (also "Susannah"; 8 September 1727 – 22 November 1822) was the eldest surviving daughter of Frederick Philipse II, 2nd Lord of Philipsburg Manor of Westchester County, New York.

She was, along with her elder brother Philip (1724–1768) and younger sisters Mary (1730–1825), and Margaret (1733–1752), a one-quarter heir to the roughly 250 mi^{2} (650 km^{2}) "Highland Patent" of her father (later to become known as the Philipse Patent, and in time today's Putnam County of southeastern New York).

Susanna was married to Beverley Robinson, a soldier from a prominent family in the Colony of Virginia who had relocated to the Province of New York. He was a childhood friend of future American general and statesman George Washington, who was for a time during the French and Indian War an irregular guest at their home on Susanna's land on the east bank of the Hudson. It is there Washington is said to have developed an attraction to Susanna's younger sister Mary.

During the Revolution Susanna's lands and the Robinson family fortune were confiscated by the rebel government of the New York Colony. Their home became the headquarters of soon to turn treasonous Continental Army general Benedict Arnold. During an extended stay there by Washington Arnold's plans were revealed through the capture of British spymaster Major John André. Following his trial and sentencing Beverley Robinson was sent to Washington to plead for André's life. Washington refused to see him.

Following the war the Robinsons relocated to Southwest England, where in time they received a partial payment for their seized properties. Both died and were interred there.

== Marriage ==
On 7 July 1748, she married then-Captain Beverley Robinson, a soldier from a prominent family in the Colony of Virginia, in Trinity Church, New York City. Robinson had personally raised a company of troops there in 1745 and relocated it to the Province of New York to defend that state's frontier against Indian attack. The couple went on have at least five children, four boys and a girl, including Beverley Honorable Robinson (1754–1816), Morris (1759–1815), Susanna Maria Robinson (1760–1833), John Robinson (1761–1828), and Frederick Philipse Robinson (1763–1852).

== Inheritance ==
Margaret Philipse died intestate in 1752, and her share of the Highland Patent was equally divided among her named living siblings. A redistribution of the land among them was done in 1754.

Susanna's eldest brother, Frederick Philipse III (1720–1785), inherited the family's vast 81 mi^{2} (210 km^{2}) hereditary estate in lower Westchester County, New York, Philipsburg Manor, and was its third and last Lord.

Upon Susanna's inheritance of her interest in the Patent, the Robinsons settled on her land, gradually renting parcels to tenant farmers. It was a pleasant life, though Susanna's plots were only lightly settled and lacked the commerce and industry of her eldest brother's Manor.

== American Revolution ==
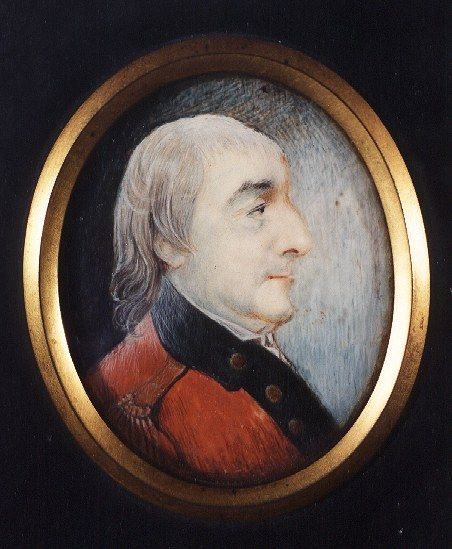
Portrait miniature of Robinson as colonel of the Loyal American Regiment

With the onset of the American Revolutionary War Beverley sought to remain uninvolved, but in time relented. In 1777, he formed the Loyal American Regiment, which proved a very active Loyalist force in that conflict.

In addition to serving as its Colonel and commander through the British defeat 1783, he was known for his work with British intelligence during the war, particularly in regards to the defection of Continental Army general Benedict Arnold to the British. Sons Beverly Robinson Jr., a lieutenant-colonel, and Frederick, an ensign who went on to a long and distinguished career as a general in the British Army and colonial governor within the Empire, served beneath him.

== Confiscation ==
All the Philipses were Loyalists throughout the war, and the inherited Philipse Patent lands were confiscated in 1779 by the Revolutionary government of the New York Colony, then sold off. In spite of a provision in the 1783 Treaty of Paris assuring restitution, no compensation was ever paid the Robinson family by the Colonial government.

Much later, the British Compensation Commission granted the Robinsons £24,000 toward the original £80,000 value of the couple's personal estate (reflecting about £16,000 Sterling, plus the 60,000 Philipse Patent acres and some city property valued together at about £64,000), though only about £17,000 was ever paid.

== Later days ==
Following the war the Robinsons retired to Britain with some of their family, where both lived out their days. Susanna died aged 95 in 1822 and was buried in the St Mary the Virgin Parish Churchyard, Thornbury, South Gloucestershire Unitary Authority, Gloucestershire, England.

== See also ==
- Philipse family
- Philipse Patent
- Dutchess County Land Patents
- The Oblong
