= Beverley Robinson =

Loyalist American army officer (1721–1792)

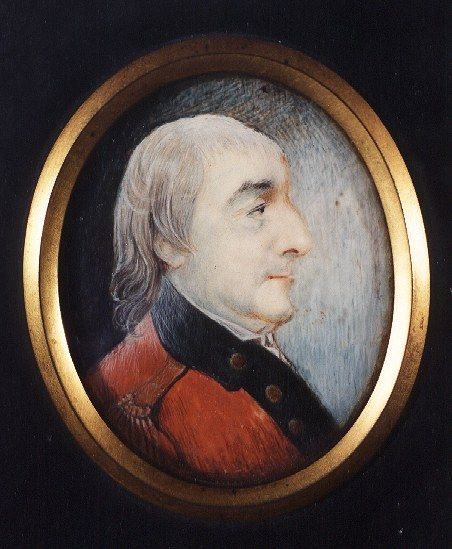
- Portrait of Robinson
- Born: 11 January 1721; Middlesex County, Virginia
- Died: 9 April 1792 (aged 71); Thornbury, England
- Occupation: Military officer
- Spouse: Susanna Philipse (m. 1748)
- Children: 10, including Frederick
- Parent(s): John Robinson; Catherine Beverley Robinson

Colonel Beverley Robinson (11 January 1721 – 9 April 1792) was an American-born military officer who became a wealthy colonist of the Province of New York and is best known as a Loyalist during the American Revolutionary War. Robinson married Susanna Philipse, heiress to a significant share of the roughly 250 square miles (650 km^{2}) Highland Patent on the lower Hudson River in the Province of New York.

In 1777 Robinson formed the Loyal American Regiment, which became very active in that conflict. He also worked with British spymaster Major John André, particularly in switching the allegiances of Continental general Benedict Arnold. At the time of his betrayal, Gen. Arnold was using the confiscated Robinson home as his headquarters, as was Continental Army commander-in-chief George Washington. Captured spy André was brought to the house and following André's trial and sentencing British commanding general Sir Henry Clinton sent a delegation to Gen. Washington that included Robinson as a character witness for Andre, to plead for the Major's life.

During the war, the Revolutionary government of New York confiscated the Philipse Patent lands because of Robinson's public allegiance to Britain. Following Britain's defeat, the Robinsons retired to Britain with some of their family. In spite of a provision in the 1783 Treaty of Paris advocating restitution for their losses, no compensation was ever paid the Robinson family by the United States. Much later they were awarded a settlement of approximately 25% of their combined family property's £80,000 original value by the British Compensation Commission, ultimately receiving less than 20% in payment.

== Early life ==
Coat of Arms of Beverley Robinson

Robinson was born to the First Families of Virginia in Middlesex County in the Colony of Virginia on 11 January 1721. A distant relative was bishop John Robinson, and an uncle Christopher Robinson was on the Governor's Council for the Colony of Virginia, as was this man's father John Robinson. His mother, Catherine, was the daughter of Major Robert Beverley, a British merchant who had emigrated to the Virginia Colony from Kingston-upon-Hull in Yorkshire, served on the Governor's Council, and acquired significant landholdings by importing indentured servants, as well as by using his political connections and expertise. His maternal uncle Peter Beverley had served as speaker of the House of Burgesses, as well as on the Governor's Council and other offices in the colony. Thus, his parents were, in property and family, among the leading families in the province. His elder brother John Robinson would become the longest-serving speaker of the House of Burgesses, as well as Treasurer of the Virginia colony, but his practice of loaning out state money to politically important planters would create a scandal in that colony after 1766. Nonetheless, many of their Virginia relatives would become active patriots during the American Revolution.

== Career ==
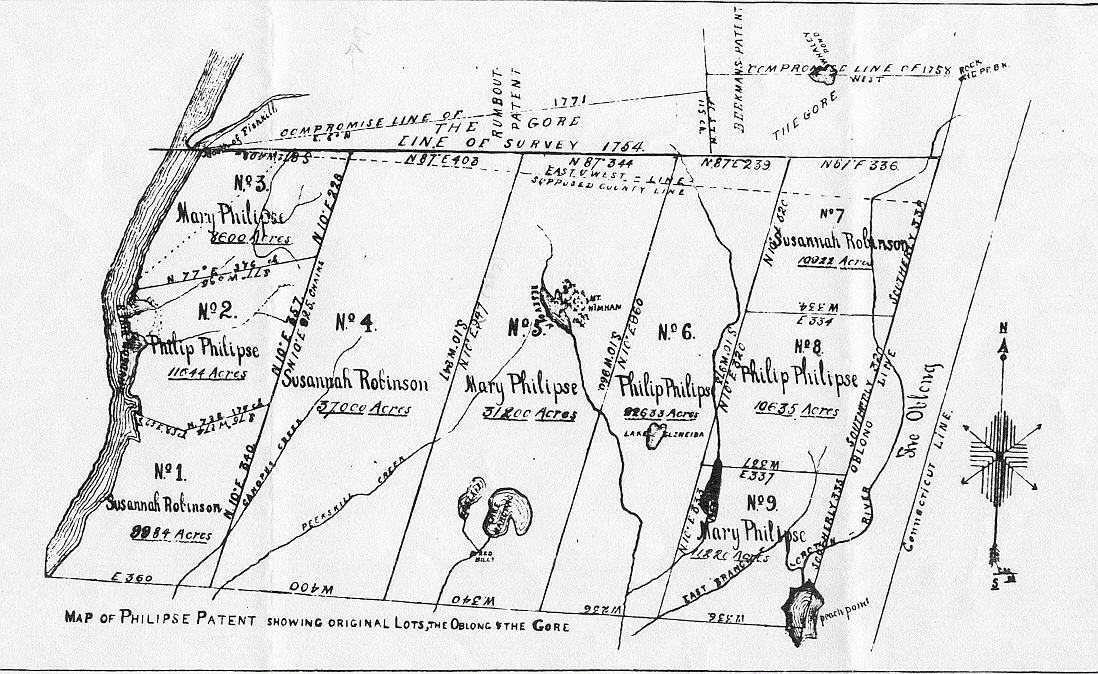
Map of the Philipse Patent showing the holdings of Philip Philipse, Mary Philipse, and Robinson's wife Susanna Philipse

In 1745, Beverley Robinson raised an independent company of soldiers in Virginia and took them to New York to defend that state's frontier against Indian attack.

In 1752, his wife, her elder brother Philip, and younger sister Mary, each inherited a one-third share of what then became known at the "Philipse Patent", effectively today's Putnam County, New York. Upon his wife's inheritance, the now wealthy couple settled on a parcel of her land at the foot of Sugarloaf Hill in the Hudson Highlands where they built a family home they called Beverley. George Washington was for a time an irregular guest, developing an attraction to Susanna's younger sister Mary. The Patent itself was only lightly settled by tenant farmers and lacked the commerce and industry of the Manor which had been inherited by her eldest brother.

=== American Revolution ===
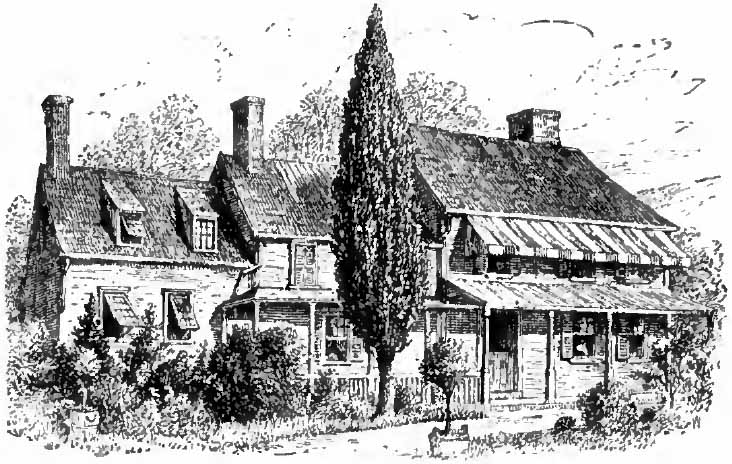
Col. Beverley Robinson's house in the Hudson Highlands, occupied by Arnold as his headquarters

With the onset of the American Revolutionary War Robinson sought to remain uninvolved and, reportedly, "desired to remain in the quiet enjoyment of country life and management of his large domain. He was opposed to the measures of the British Ministry, gave up the use of imported merchandise, and clothed himself and his family in fabrics of domestic manufacture." Nevertheless, he entered the military service of the Crown. Due to his standing entitled him to high rank, and upon raising the "Loyal American Regiment" in 1777, principally in New York, he was commissioned its Colonel. He also commanded the corps of Guides and Pioneers, which included black Loyalist soldiers from the Black Company of Pioneers. His sons figured prominently in the selection of officers for the Loyal American Regiment, with Beverley Jr. serving as Lieutenant-Colonel and Frederick an ensign. The regiment, which saw much fighting in the course of the war, figured most prominently in the attack on the Hudson River's Fort Montgomery, on 6 October 1777, when British and Loyalist forces overwhelmed the Colonials in the Battle of Fort Montgomery.

Robinson was also heavily involved in the treason of Benedict Arnold, and it is generally believed that he was acquainted with the traitor's purpose before it was known to Sir Henry Clinton, or any other person. And it appears certain that Arnold addressed him a letter on the subject of going over to the Royal side, before soliciting the command of West Point. As the plot matured, he accompanied Major John André, the head of British intelligence operations in North America, to Dobb's Ferry to meet Arnold, according to a previous arrangement; but an accident prevented an interview, and both returned to New York. Subsequently, he went up the Hudson River in HMS Vulture, for the purpose of furthering the objects in view; but failed in his most material designs. Arnold now sent Smith on board Vulture with a letter, which was delivered to Colonel Robinson, and on the faith of which André went on shore. The treacherous Whig had been expected on the ship in person, and it has been said that Robinson was much opposed to André's trusting himself to the honour "of a man who was seeking to betray his country." But the zealous young officer would not listen to the prudent counsel, and determined to embark upon the duty from which he never returned.

On 23 September 1780, André was captured and on 26 September was conveyed a prisoner to Colonel Robinson's own house, which, with the lands adjacent, had been confiscated by the state, which Arnold had occupied as his headquarters, and of which Washington was then a temporary occupant. After André's trial and conviction, Clinton sent three commissioners to the Whig camp, in the hope of producing a change in the determination of Washington, and of showing André's innocence; to this mission Robinson was attached in the character of a witness. He had previously addressed the Commander-in-Chief on the subject of André's release; and, as he and Washington had been personal friends until political events had produced a separation, he took occasion to speak of their former acquaintance in his letter.

On 6 September 1781, Robinson was not in command of the Loyal American Regiment that accompanied Benedict Arnold in the burning of New London, Connecticut. His son, Lieut. Colonel Beverly Robinson Jr. commanded it in his place.

=== Post-war life ===
In 1779, the inherited Philipse lands and property, including Susanna's share of the Philipse Patent, were forfeited and seized by provincial New York authorities. The property was auctioned off in 1782 by the Commissioners of Forfeiture without compensation to the Robinsons, in spite of assurances of restitution in the 1783 Treaty of Paris that Revolutionary representatives signed with the British.

At the end of the war, Colonel Robinson went to England with a part of his family. Ultimately the British Compensation Commission granted them £24,000 toward the original £80,000 value of his and Susanna's personal estate (reflecting about £16,000 Sterling, plus the 60,000 Philipse Patent acres and some city property valued together at about £64,000), though only about £17,000 was ever paid.

== Personal life ==
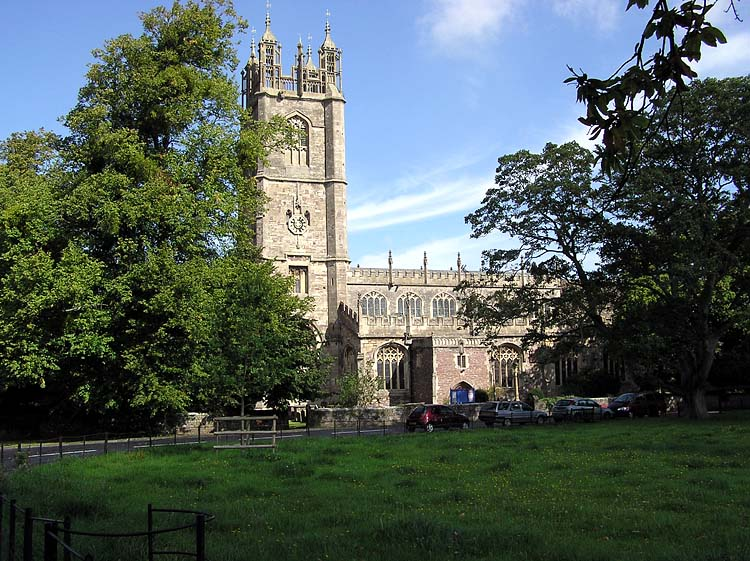
St Mary's Church, Thornbury

On 7 July 1748, Robinson was married to Susanna Philipse (1727–1822) at Trinity Church, New York City. She was the eldest surviving daughter of Frederick Philipse II, second Lord of Philipsburg Manor, a very prosperous 81 mi^{2} (210 km^{2}) hereditary estate in lower Westchester County. Along with her brother Philip and sisters Margaret and Mary she held a one-quarter interest at the time in the Highland Patent (later one-third), a roughly 250 square miles (650 km^{2}) landed estate on the Hudson River spanning fully between the Hudson Highlands and the Connecticut Colony border. The Robinsons had ten children, three of whom died young. The surviving children included four boys and a girl:

- Beverly Robinson, Jr. (1754–1816), who married Anna Dorothea Barclay.
- Morris Robinson (1759–1815), who married Margaret Ann Waring.
- Susanna Maria Robinson (1760–1833), who died unmarried.
- John Robinson (1761–1828), who married Elizabeth Ludlow (1768–1826), a daughter of George Duncan Ludlow, a fellow loyalist who served as the 1st Chief Justice of New Brunswick.
- Frederick Philipse Robinson (1763–1852), who married Grace Boles, daughter of Thomas Boles, Esq., of Charleville, in the early 1790s. After her death in 1806, he married Ann Fernyhough, of Stafford, in 1811 who later died at Tobago.
- William Henry Robinson (1766–1836), who was sent to England at the beginning of the Revolution. He served as the Commissary General of British North America during the War of 1812. He married Catherine Skinner, daughter of General Cortlandt Skinner, and sired a daughter and son, Col. William Henry Skinner.

Like many loyalists who moved to England, Robinson reportedly felt out of place and unappreciated. He resided at Thornbury, near Bristol in Southwest England, and died there on 9 April 1792, at the age of seventy. He was buried at St Mary the Virgin Parish Churchyard in Thornbury.
