= Margaret Philipse (1733–1752) =

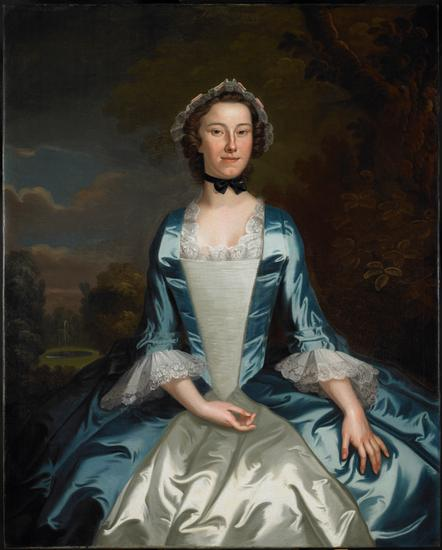
c. 1751 portrait of Philipse by John Wollaston

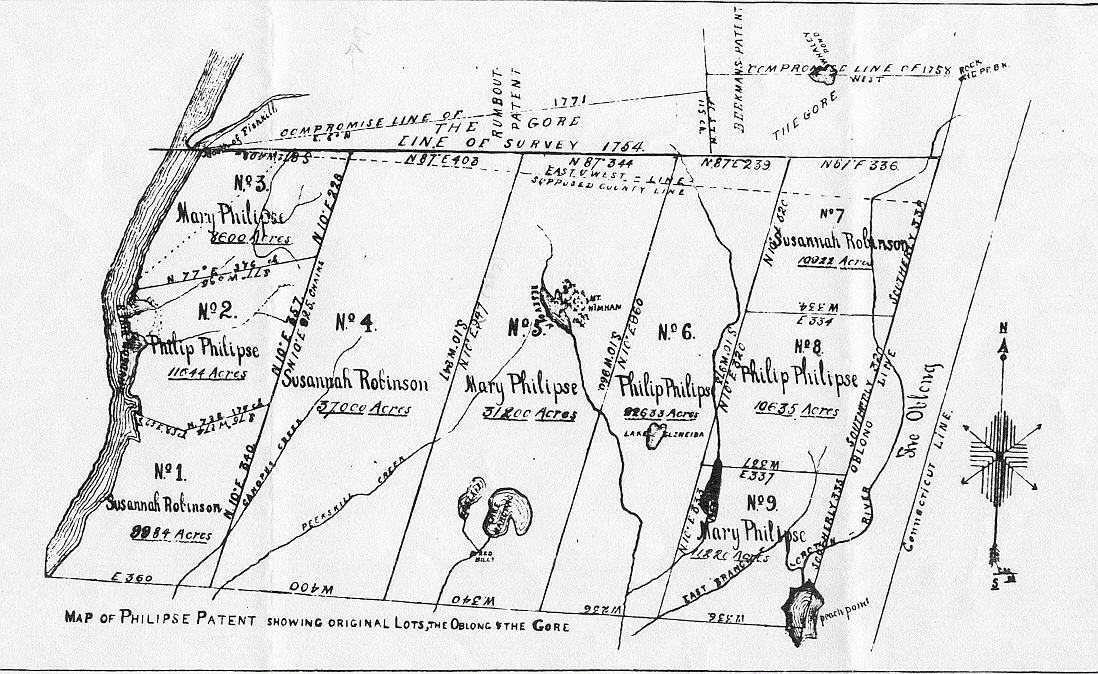
Map of the Philipse Patent showing the holdings of Philip, Susanna, and Mary Philipse

Margaret Philipse (1733 – 1752) was the daughter of Frederick Philipse II, 2nd Lord of Philipsburg Manor of Westchester County, New York.

She was, along with her brother Philip (1724–1768) and sisters Susanna (1727–1822) and Mary (1730–1825), a one-quarter heir to the roughly 250 sq mi (650 km^{2}) "Highland Patent" of her father (later to become known as the Philipse Patent, and in time today's Putnam County of southeastern New York). She died intestate, and her share was equally divided among her named living siblings. A redistribution of the land among them was done in 1754.

As all the Philipses were Loyalists during the Revolutionary War, Margaret's siblings had their lands seized in 1779 by the Revolutionary government of the Province of New York and were never compensated for their loss.

== See also ==
- Philipse family
- Her grandmother, Margaret Hardenbroeck
- Philipse Patent
- Dutchess County, New York#The Patents
- The Oblong
