= Philip Philipse (1724–1768) =

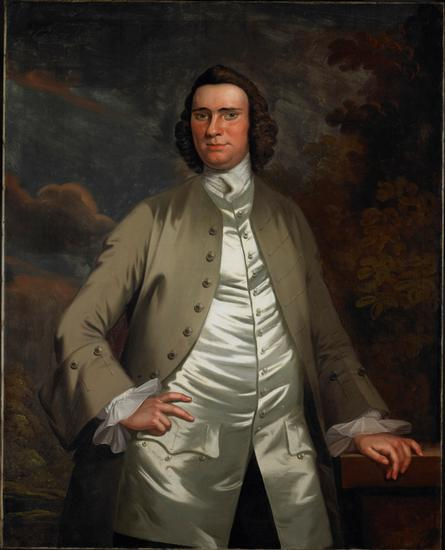
c. 1751 portrait of Philipse by John Wollaston

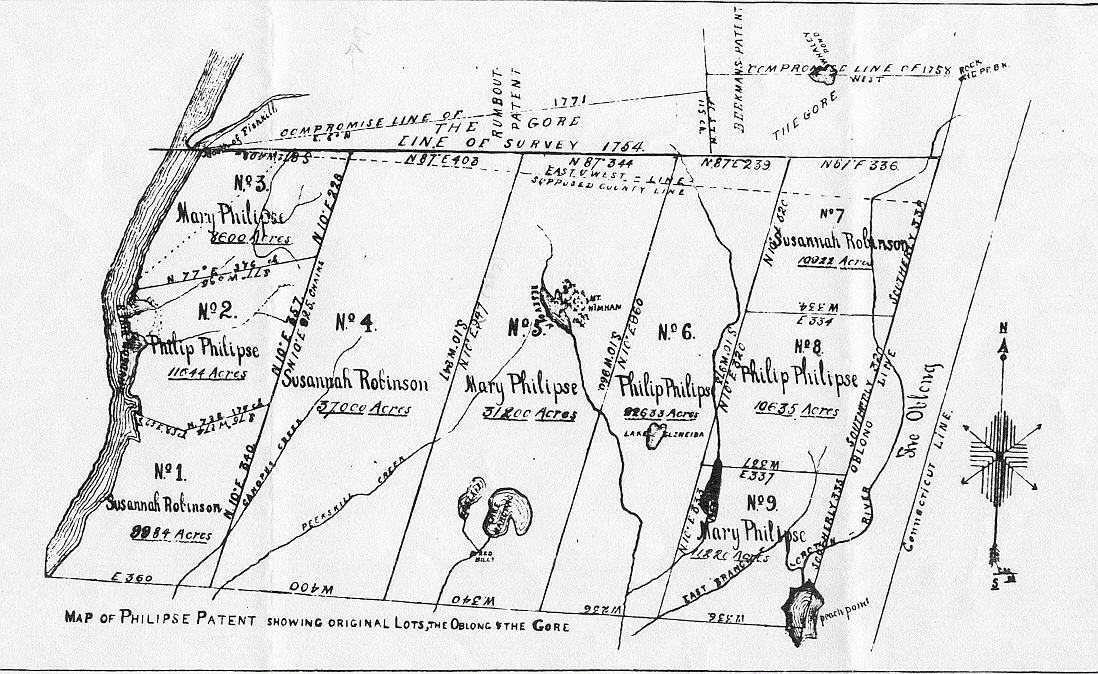
Map of the Philipse Patent showing the holdings of Philip, Susanna, and Mary Philipse

Philip Philipse (1724 – 1768) was the second son of Frederick Philipse II, 2nd Lord of Philipsburg Manor of Westchester County, New York.

== Inheritance ==
He was, along with his sisters Susanna (1727–1822), Mary (1730–1825), and Margaret (1733–1752), a one-quarter heir to the roughly 250 mi^{2} (650 km^{2}) "Highland Patent" of his father (later to become known as the Philipse Patent, and in time today's Putnam County of southeastern New York).

Margaret died intestate, and her share was equally divided among her named living siblings. A redistribution of the land among them was done in 1754.

Philip's elder brother, Frederick Philipse III (1720–1785), inherited the family's vast 52,000 acre hereditary estate in lower Westchester County, New York, Philipsburg Manor, and was its third and last Lord.

All the Philipses were Loyalists during the Revolutionary War, which began seven years after Philip died, and had their lands seized in 1779 by the Revolutionary government of the Province of New York. Though never compensated for their losses by the Colonial government, various family members did receive payments from the British government in following years:

- Frederick III was allegedly "compensated handsomely by the crown" for the loss of his manor, but only a pension of 200 pounds has been identified;
- Susanna Philipse and her husband Colonel Beverley Robinson were granted £24,000 by the British Compensation Commission (evidently prior to Robinson's death in 1791) toward the original £80,000 value of he and Susanna's personal estate (reflecting about £16,000 Sterling, plus the 60,000 Philipse Patent acres and some city property valued together at about £64,000); only about £17,000 was ever paid;
- Mary Philipse was able to retain a right to her share of the Highland Patent in spite of its attainder by the State of New York's Commissioners of Forfeiture by virtue of a life trust established by a prenuptial agreement with future husband Roger Morris. It was purchased from her in 1809, payable at that time, for 20,000 pounds by John Jacob Astor, and vested with him upon her death at the age of 95 in 1825. He later sold the land to the State of New York.
- It is unclear what became of Philip Philipse's interest after his death in 1768; his spouse Margaret survived him until 1807, and his son Frederick lived until 1829.

== Marriage and offspring ==
Philip married Margaret (Marston) Philipse (1727-1807). They had a son, Frederick Philipse (1755-1829), later a captain in the military. He married twice, first to Mary Marston (b.1757), then Maria Kemble (1771-1839). With Mary he had a daughter, Mary (Philipse) Gouverneur (1779-1848).

== See also ==
- Philipse family
- Philip Philipse (1663–1699), his grandfather
- Philipse Patent
- Dutchess County Land Patents
- The Oblong
