= Loyal American Regiment =

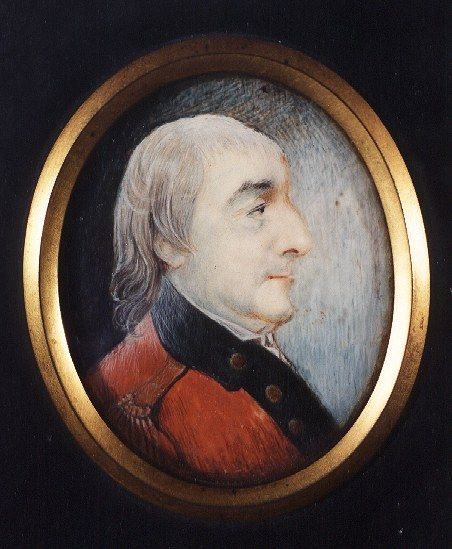
- Portrait miniature of the regiment's founder, Beverley Robinson
- Active: 1777-1783
- Country: Great Britain
- Allegiance: Provincial Corps
- Type: Line infantry
- Role: Garrison duty, special operations, maneuver warfare, light infantry, Special detachments
- Size: Infantry Regiment
- Garrison/HQ: Kingsbridge, Province of New York
- Nickname: The Loyal American's
- Engagements: American Revolutionary War: Saratoga campaign; Battle of Forts Clinton and Montgomery (1777); Northern Theater after 1777; Battle of Stony Point (1779); Verplanck's Point (1779); Southern Campaign; Siege of Charleston (1780); Battle of Monck's Corner (1780); Battle of Kings Mountain (1780); Battle of Eutaw Springs (1781); Northern Coastal Theater; Battle of Groton Heights (1781)

Commanders
- Notable commanders: Brigadier General Benedict Arnold; Colonel Beverley Robinson; Lieutenant Colonel Frederick Philipse Robinson; Major Thomas Barclay

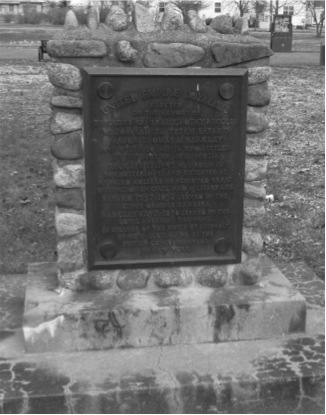
Monument to Major Thomas Barclay of the Loyal American Regiment, Middleton Park, Middleton, Nova Scotia, Canada

The Loyal American Regiment was a Loyalist line infantry regiment raised in 1777 to serve alongside the British Army during the American Revolutionary War. Organizationally part of the Provincial Corps, the regiment fought in several engagements throughout the war before being disbanded in 1783 upon the conflict's conclusion. Surviving veterans of the regiment were among the thousands of United Empire Loyalists who were resettled in Nova Scotia by British authorities.

== Regiment formed ==
The Loyal American Regiment was raised in mid-March 1777 by wealthy loyalist Beverley Robinson. Robinson, a childhood friend of George Washington, commanded the regiment until it was disbanded at the end of the war in 1783. Several of Beverley Robinson's sons were officers in the regiment, including Frederick Philipse Robinson. A number of the enlisted men in the Loyal Americans were tenant farmers who worked Robinson's estate in the Philipse Patent then in lower Dutchess and Westchester counties of the Province of New York.

== Early Campaigns ==
The Loyal American Regiment served in many war-time engagements, often at detachment strength. The Loyal Americans spent many months of the war in the Province of New York at Morrisania and Kingsbridge defending British-occupied New York City. The Loyal Americans are best known for being the first British regiment to enter Fort Montgomery in the Hudson Highlands when it was captured during the Battle of Fort Montgomery on October 6, 1777.

The regiment continued garrison duty on the lines at Kingsbridge or on Long Island until the Spring of 1779 when they took part in yet another expedition up the Hudson, this time garrisoning the posts of Verplanck's Point and Stony Point. A detachment of the regiment was captured in July 1779, during the Battle of Stony Point when the fort at was taken in the Battle of Stony Point by the Continental Army.

== Emmerick's Chasseurs ==
Several detachments of men from the regiment served with distinction in other Provincial units during the American Revolution. In August 1777, Captain Joshua Barnes had his company transferred into a new Loyalist regiment commanded by the German soldier Lt. Col. Andreas Emmerich (also spelled Emmerick). Called Emmerick's Chasseurs, this corps expanded into a legion of dragoons, riflemen, light infantry, and chasseurs and served on the lines of Kingsbridge, making forays into the Neutral Ground of Westchester County. During a raid on Westchester's Saw Mill River valley on November 17-18, 1777, Emmerick's Chasseurs burned the homes of local Patriot leaders Israel Honeywell, Cornelius Van Tassel, and Peter Van Tassel. In retaliation, the Patriot militiamen ventured down the Hudson River to Manhattan, where they burned the home of Oliver De Lancey, commander of another Loyalist military unit, De Lancey's Brigade, closely allied with the Chasseurs. Historian Robert Bolton recounted the two raids:

On November 17th, 1777, the British, under Captain Emmerick, made an excursion from their quarters, to the Saw-Mill Valley, and completely surprised the Van Tassels, who were residing near Captain Romer’s, burnt their houses, “stripped the women and children of the necessary apparel to cover them from the severity of a cold winter’s night," and led off in triumph, the two brothers, Peter and Cornelius Van Tassel.” In retaliation for this inhuman outrage, the patriots fitted up an expedition at Tarrytown, under the command of Abraham Martlingh, which proceeded down the Hudson River, passed the enemy’s guardboats in safety, and succeeded in setting fire to General Oliver de Lancey’s house on New York island, after plundering it of its contents.

By 1779, the corps was in disarray, with many officers opposing Emmerick, which led to its disbanding in August 1779.

== The Southern Theatre ==
In December 1779, Major Patrick Ferguson recruited volunteers from amongst the Provincial Corps at New York to serve as riflemen and rangers on the up-coming expedition to take Charleston, South Carolina. Known as the "American Volunteers", this corps landed in Georgia in the beginning of February, 1780 and made its way to the Siege of Charleston, taking part in the destruction and dispersal of the Continental Cavalry at the Battle of Monck's Corner.

The Loyal Americans continued to serve as a detached Company of Foot, and assisted in the training of Loyalist militia regiments. They suffered heavy casualties soon after, during the Battle of King's Mountain. The survivors either returned to the regiment over time or sat out the war in prison.

The Light Company was detached in October 1780 under Major General Alexander Leslie, serving with five other companies of light infantry raised from other Provincial regiments from the New York area. After some minor forays into the Chesapeake Bay, the Light Company was ordered to Charleston. The Light Company operated in the High Hills of Santee, mostly engaged in operations against the rebel partisan Thomas Sumter. After many skirmishes and casualties, they fought at the bloody Battle of Eutaw Springs, in September 1781. Suffering many casualties, the companies were returned to their parent units at New York in the Spring of 1782.

== Virginia and New Jersey ==
A raid by British forces, including the Loyal Americans, against Hackensack in March 1780, resulted in the burning of the town's courthouse. In April 1780 50 men of the corps assisted in the surprise attack on the Pennsylvania Line in Paramus, New Jersey. The regiment once remained in garrison until December 1780 when it was ordered to Virginia under the command of Benedict Arnold.

The regiment suffered very severely throughout January 1781 and thereafter until they returned to New York in early June of that year. Receiving little rest, they took part in an unsuccessful raid to Pleasant Valley, New Jersey under Brig. Genl. Cortlandt Skinner of the New Jersey Volunteers.

== New London ==
Between September 4–14, 1781, under the command of Lieut. Colonel Beverly Robinson Jr., the Loyal American Regiment participated in the Battle of Groton Heights at New London, Connecticut commanded by Brigadier General Benedict Arnold. On September 6, the regiment landed about four miles south of New London. With four companies of the 38th Regiment of Foot, it assaulted and captured Fort Nonsense. Later, it took part in the occupation of the town, where it searched for and burned military and public stores.

== Resettlement in British Canada ==
When the war was over, Loyalists were unwelcome in the former colonies. From New York City, Britain transported thousands of Loyalists to Nova Scotia throughout the early fall of 1783. In all about 33,000 were settled in Nova Scotia, New Brunswick (separated from Nova Scotia in 1784), Prince Edward Island, and Quebec (including areas that were eventually separated to form Upper Canada, eventually renamed Ontario). Many members of the Loyal American Regiment settled there; some were among the first colonists of the newly formed province of New Brunswick.

== Reenactments ==
Reenactors have recreated Robinson's unit wearing green coats, the standard issue for loyalist soldiers at the beginning of the war.

== Notable Soldiers ==
- Thomas Henry Barclay
- Sir Frederick Philipse Robinson

== See also ==
- Military history of Nova Scotia
- Nova Scotia in the American Revolution
