= Bull Hill =

Mountain in New York, United States

Mount Taurus
- Bull Hill
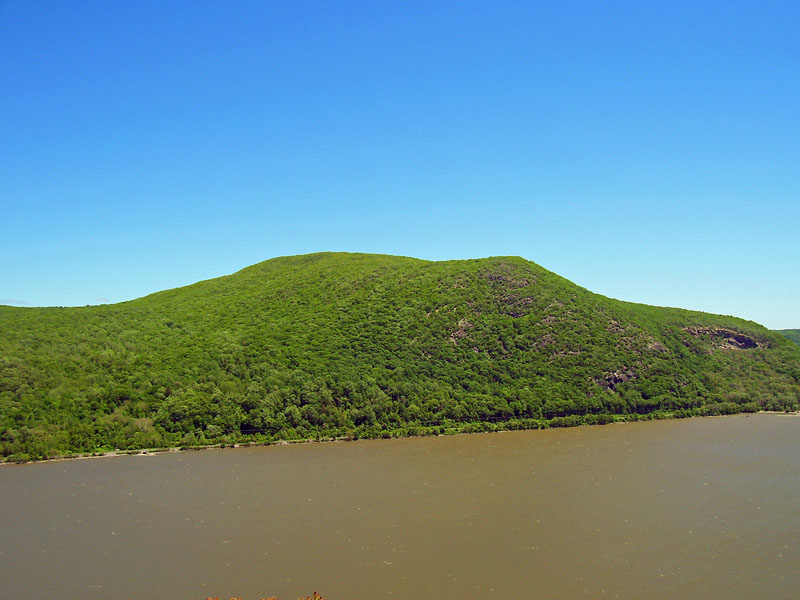
- Bull Hill from Storm King Mountain

Highest point
- Elevation: 1,420 ft (430 m)
- Prominence: 680 ft (210 m)
- Listing: New York mountains
- Coordinates: 41°26′18″N 73°57′20″W

Geography
- Location: North Highlands, New York
- Parent range: Hudson Highlands
- Topo map: West Point

Geology
- Mountain type(s): Precambrian igneous and metamorphic rocks

Climbing
- Easiest route: Hike

Bull Hill, also known as Mount Taurus, is a mountain north of the village of Cold Spring on the Hudson River in Putnam County in the State of New York. It is part of the river-straddling range known as the Hudson Highlands. The original name came after a bull that used to terrorize the mountain was chased by indignant inhabitants. A hunting party drove the bull over the hill. In an attempt to flee the mountaineers, the bull plunged out into space and fell down. Its broken and shapeless mass on the rocks was memorialized in the name of the mountain the bull used to haunt.

While not as well known as neighboring Breakneck Ridge or Storm King Mountain across the river, it too is part of Hudson Highlands State Park and has an extensive trail system and offers hikers sweeping views of the river and neighboring peaks from rock outcrops near its wooded 1,420-foot (433 m) summit, higher than both neighbors.
