= Mary Philipse =

American heiress and socialite

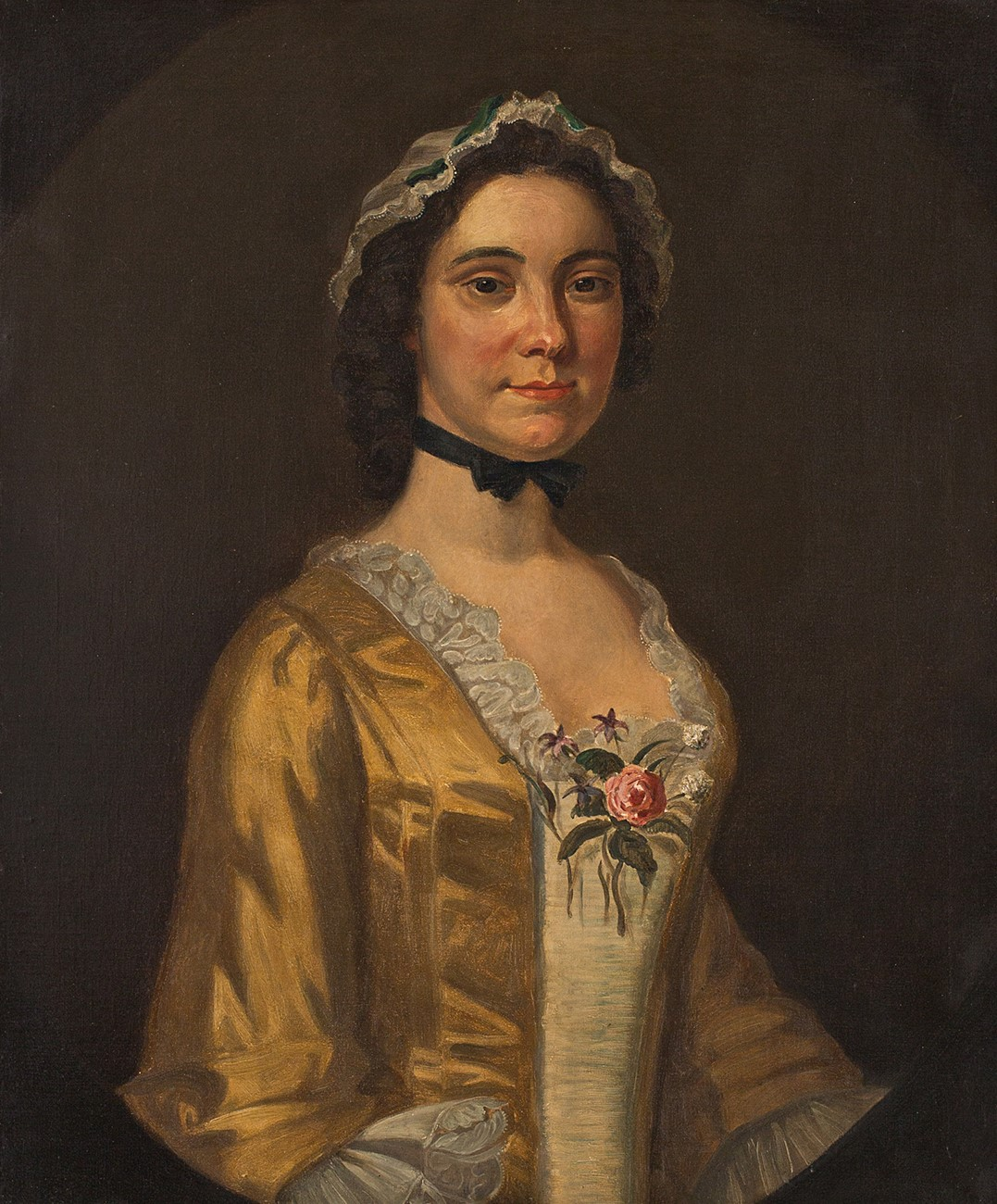
Copy by Howard Russell Butler of a portrait of Philipse by John Wollaston

Mary Philipse (3 July 1730 – 16 July 1825) was an American heiress and socialite who was the middle daughter of Frederick Philipse II, 2nd Lord of Philipsburg Manor of Westchester County, New York. Of Anglo-Dutch extraction, she was a wealthy heiress, possible early love interest of George Washington, and New York City socialite. Married to an ex-British army colonel, her Loyalist sympathies in the American Revolution reshaped her life.

At the age of 22 she inherited one-third of her father's roughly 250 mi^{2} (650 km^{2}) "Highland Patent", which sprawled from the Hudson Highlands on the west bank of the lower Hudson River to the Connecticut Colony in the east.

In 1758 she married in New York British Lieutenant-colonel Roger Morris (January 1727 – September 1794), who had served in the French and Indian War.

With Roger's appointment to the Governor's Council of the Province of New York the couple became pillars of the local establishment. A year after their marriage Morris had a large country estate, Mount Morris, built in northern Manhattan between the Hudson and Harlem rivers in what is now Washington Heights. An amateur artist, Mary Morris' self-portrait is on display at Mount Morris.

The family lived there until 1775. Roger fled to England at the onset of the Revolution. In October 1779, the New York Act of Attainder, or Confiscation Act named landowners who acted injurious to the state, declared them guilty of "overt acts of high treason," and stated they shall "suffer death" without the right of judicial recourse. In 1779, the government of the Colony of New York seized both Morris' personal property and Mary's inheritances.

Only three women were named traitors in the American Revolution, convicted under this New York law of "high treason". Mary (Philipse) Morris was one of them; she escaped to England at the close of the war. The United States Constitution later forbade legislative bills of attainder: in federal law under Article I, Section 9, and in state law under Article I, Section 10.

Despite assurance of restitution in the 1783 Treaty of Paris no compensation was forthcoming.

It was later found that a provision in the couple's prenuptial agreement creating a life trust transferable to their children had protected her Highland Patent inheritance from the 1779 bill of attainder. In 1809 the Morris heirs finally received from John Jacob Astor £20,000 sterling for their rights to the disputed lands.

Mary died in York, England at the age of 95. A monument is erected over her grave at St Saviour's Church there.

== Highland inheritance ==
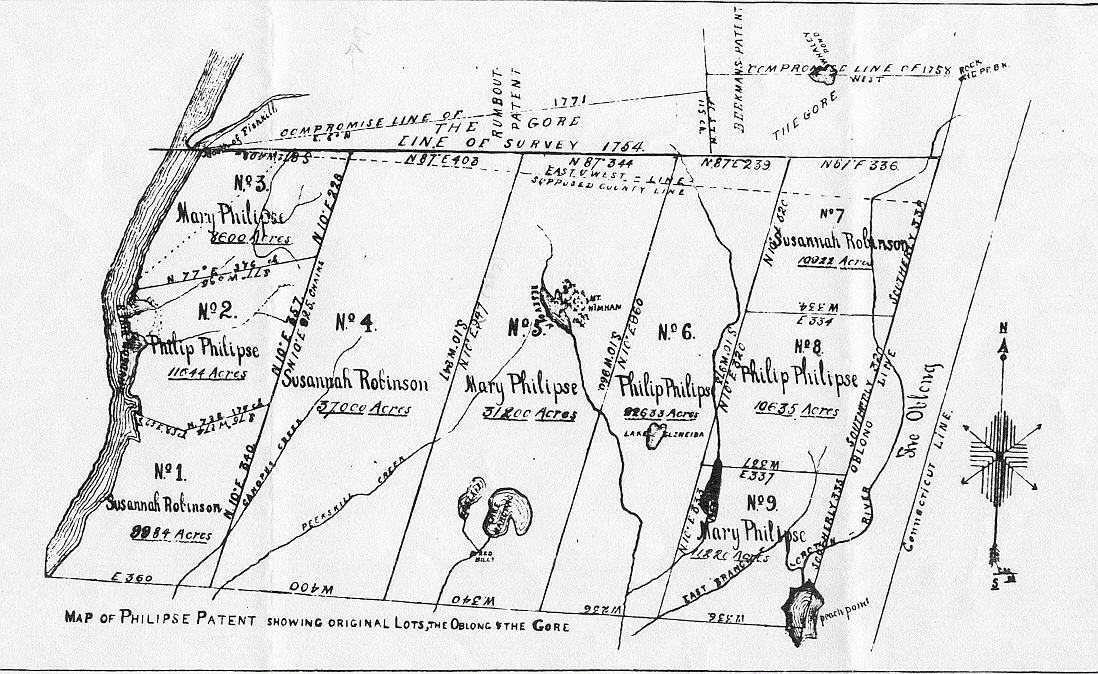
Map of the Philipse Patent showing the holdings of Philip, Susanna, and Mary Philipse

Mary was, along with her elder brother Philip, older sister Susanna (1727–1822), and younger sister Margaret (1733-1752), a one-quarter heir to the roughly 250 mi^{2} (650 km^{2}) "Highland Patent" of her father (later to become known as the Philipse Patent, and in time today's Putnam County of southeastern New York).

Margaret Philipse died intestate, and her share of the Patent was equally divided among her named living siblings. A redistribution of the land among them was done in 1754.

== The Washington legend ==
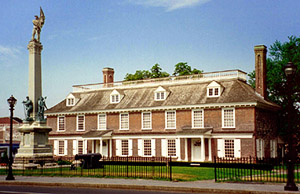
Philipse Manor Hall in today's Getty Square neighborhood of Yonkers

George Washington was a colonel in service to the British Army during the French and Indian War, serving from 1753 to 1758.

He was acquainted with Joseph Chew (born 1725), a colonial merchant and port surveyor in New London, Connecticut, through Chew's brother Colby, who served in Washington's Virginia Regiment. Chew was a friend of the Robinson and Philipse families. In early 1756 Washington had shared company with then-retired Captain Beverley Robinson and his wife Susanna, Mary's elder sister. Mary, known as "Polly", had caught Washington's eye. In 1756-1757 Chew wrote several letters to him, which survive and begat the legend of a doomed Washington/Mary Philipse love. Washington's letters to Chew – or Polly – have never surfaced.

Chew often stayed at the Philipse Manor house, the family seat on the Hudson in today's Yonkers, during his trips to Boston, and visited with Mary at the Robinson home on the Hudson in the Philipse Patent. Among his letters were the following passages:

- 4 March 1756: "I have this moment a Letter from our Worthy friend B. Robinson, he, Mrs. Robinson, the agreeable Miss Polly and all his family are Very well."
- 14 March 1757: "I am now at Mr. Robinson’s, he, Mrs. Robinson and his Dear Little Family are all well and they desire their Compliments to you. Pretty Miss Polly is in the same Condition & situation as you saw her." ("Condition & situation" have been interpreted as references to Mary's alleged affections for Washington, although such language was also employed with regards to a person's health and overall spirits.)
- 13 July 1757: "As to the Latter part of your Letter what shall I say? I often had the Pleasure of Breakfasting with the Charming Polly. Roger Morris was there (don’t be startled) but not always; you know he is a Lady’s man... " (Morris ultimately married Mary Philipse in January 1758.)
- 13 July 1757: "I intend to set out tomorrow for New York where I will not be wanting to let Miss Polly know the sincere Regard a Friend of mine has for her and I am sure if she had my Eyes to see thro she would Prefer him to all others." (The "Friend" being George Washington.)

According to Washington biographer Henry Cabot Lodge, Washington fell in love in apparently short order with Mary Philipse. Douglas Southall Freeman writes a match between George and Polly had been considered a possibility.

Within a year of his mention Mary and Roger Morris were married.

== American Revolution ==
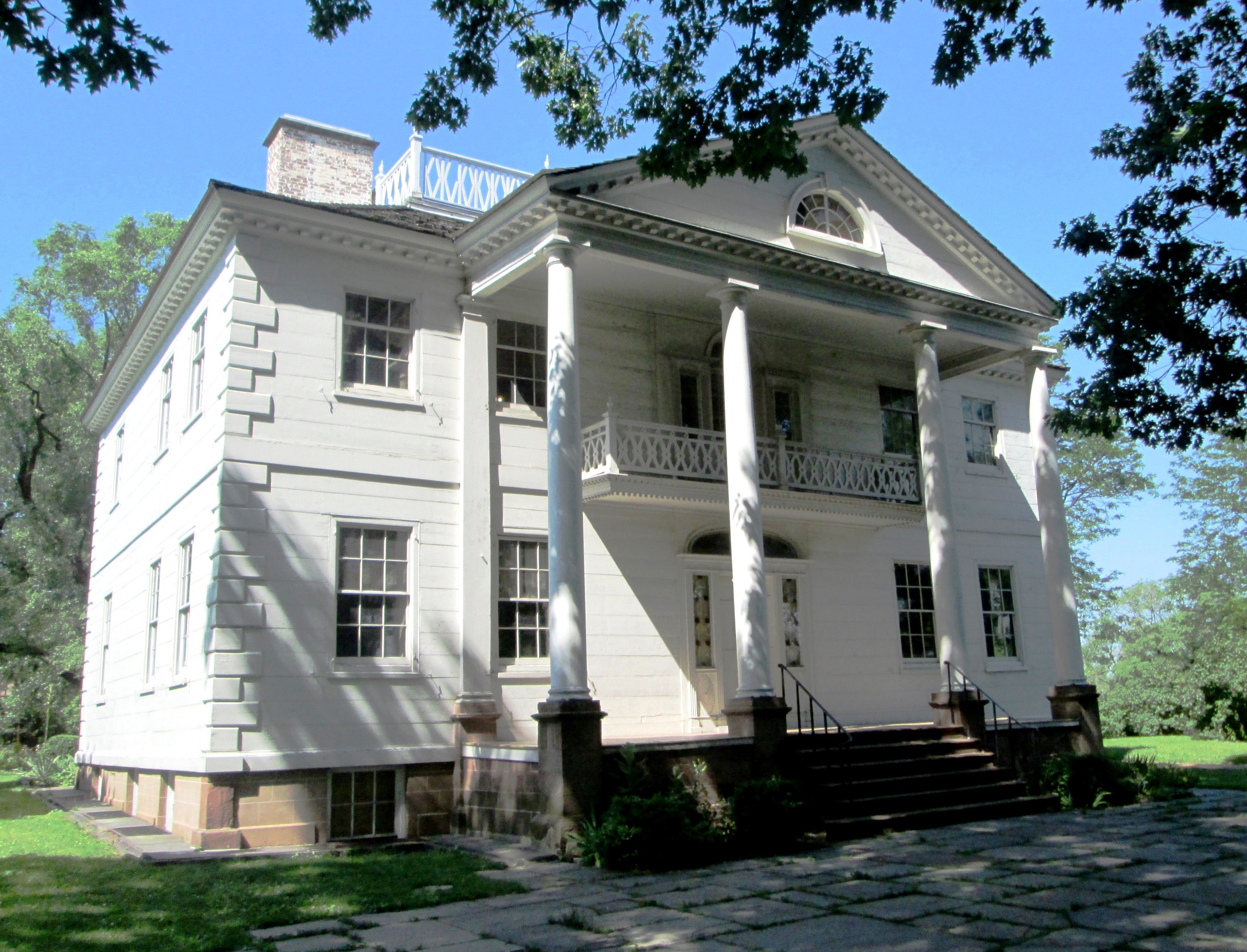
Mount Morris, today's Morris-Jumel Mansion, in the Washington Heights section of northern Manhattan. General George Washington used it as a headquarters during his defense of New York City in the American Revolution.

Morris and his family lived in Mount Morris from 1765 until 1775, when the American Revolution began. A Loyalist, Morris went to England at the start of the war, while his wife and family stayed at the family Manor house in Yonkers. Between 14 September – 20 October 1776, General George Washington used the Morris mansion as his temporary headquarters. There is no record of any communication during the war between Washington and Polly.

Morris returned to New York in 1777, after the city had been captured by the British. In 1779, estates of 58 prominent Loyalists, including the Morris home and Mary's share of the Philipse Patent, were confiscated by the Commissioners of Forfeiture of the New York Colony. Despite assurance of restitution in the 1783 Treaty of Paris compensation was not forthcoming.

== After the war ==
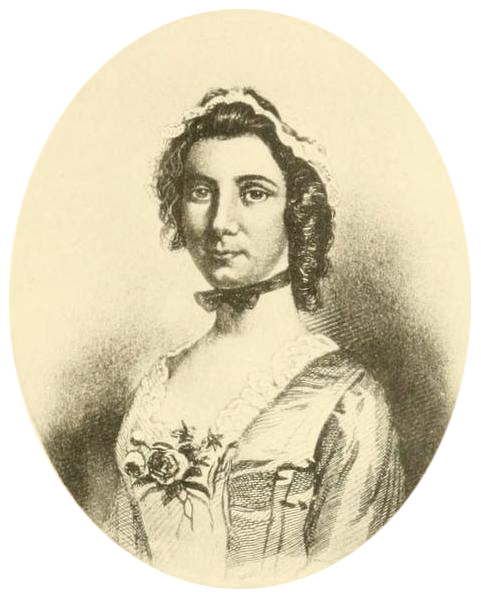
1916 portrait of Philipse

Before marrying, Philipse and Morris had signed a prenuptial agreement that shared a life lease of the estate between husband and wife, transferred to their children after their death. After the war it was subsequently shown in court that as a result the Morris share of the Philipse Patent was vested in their children and had not been reached by New York's bill of attainder. Unfortunately, a resolution ground along for decades before progress was made towards them being compensated for the wrongfully attained land.

In 1809 America's first robber baron, John Jacob Astor, bought the interest of the three surviving Morris children, Henry, Joanna, and Maria, which would take effect on Polly's death, for this property for £20,000 sterling. Astor then approached the state government (which had guaranteed clear title to the farmers) proposing to sell his claim for $300,000 but was rebuffed. Once Mrs. Morris died in 1825 and his title to the land entered into force, Astor brought suit against the state to recover the lands – or at least the rents due upon them – from the former tenant farmers who had been able to acquire their holdings from the newly independent government of New York for a fraction of their value from the Commissioners of Forfeiture in 1788 (not "during the dark days of the Revolution when the Continental Army was desperate for funds" as claimed in French's Gazetteer of the State of New York [1860]).

Astor thereupon brought suit to evict three of the farmers, and the verdict in his favor was upheld by the United States Supreme Court. In 1828 the state agreed to buy Astor out, but it was not until 1832 that Astor was finally paid some $561,000 by the state of New York to drop his claims to the land, the market value of which had been assessed at one and a half million dollars.

== Offspring ==
The Morrises had two sons, Amherst and Henry, and three daughters, Joanna, Maria, and Margaret, by the marriage.

Margaret died at age 2 in 1766.

The elder son, Amherst Morris, entered the Royal Navy, and was first lieutenant of the frigate HMS Nymphe, serving under Captain Sir Edward Pellew (later Viscount Exmouth), in her famous action with the French frigate La Cleopatre. He died in 1802.

The other son, Henry Gage Morris, also joined the Royal Navy, rising to the rank of rear-admiral. He afterwards resided at York and at Beverley, England. His son, Francis Orpen Morris, became a famous naturalist. Henry died at Beverley in 1852, and was buried in Beverley Minster.

When Amherst died in 1802 his share of the Highland Patent vested in the remaining three Morris offspring, Henry, Joanna, and Maria. Their interests in the legacy were bought out by John Jacob Astor in 1809 for £20,000 sterling.

== See also ==
- Philipse family
- Philipse Patent
- Dutchess County Land Patents
- The Oblong
