= Philipse Patent =

British royal patent for land on the Hudson River

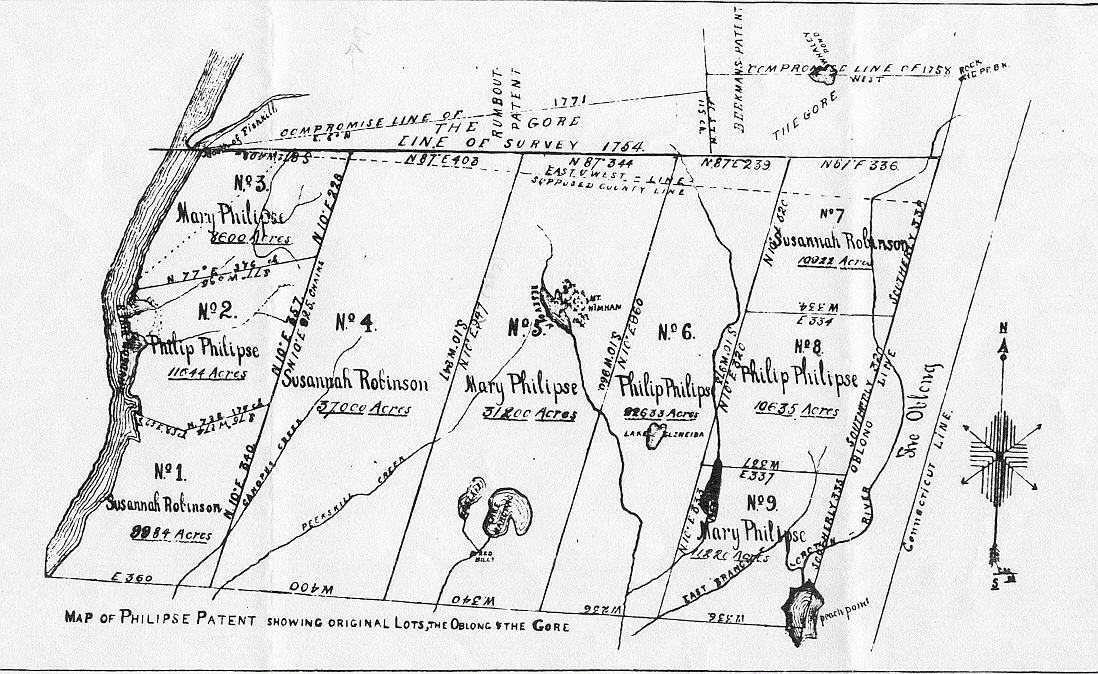
Map of Philipse Patent (showing the Oblong and Gore)

The Philipse Patent was a British royal patent for a large tract of land on the east bank of the Hudson River about 50 miles north of New York City. It was purchased in 1697 by Adolphus Philipse, a wealthy landowner of Dutch descent in the Province of New York, and in time became today's Putnam County.

Philipse bought the roughly 250 mi^{2} (650 km^{2}) tract from two Dutch traders who had purchased it from "Wiccopee chiefs" of the Wappinger native American people. The parcel received a land patent from the British Crown on 13 August 1702.

Originally known as the Highland Patent, it spanned from the Hudson to the then Connecticut Colony along today's northern Westchester County border.

In 1731 it was incorporated into Dutchess County, and divided in 1754 among three Philipse heirs. It remained in the Loyalist Philipse family until seized in 1779 during the Revolution. The Commissioners of Forfeiture of the Revolutionary Province of New York auctioned it in parcels, without compensation to its prior owners. In spite of a provision requiring restitution in the 1783 Treaty of Paris, it never was made. In 1812, the southern part of Dutchess County, including all of what had been the Phillipse Patent, was spun off into a newly created Putnam County.

== History ==
=== Background ===
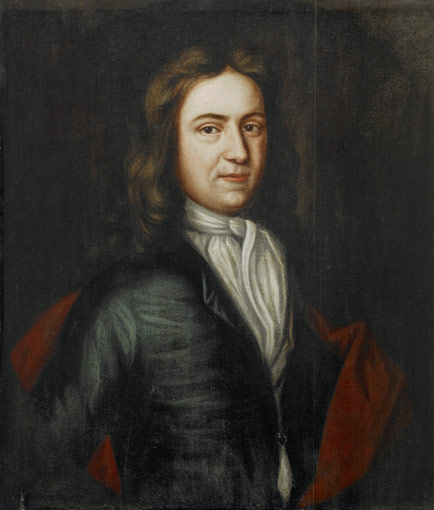
Adolphus Philipse (1665-1749), son of Frederick, first Lord of the Manor of Philipsborough

The first step to establishing rights to real estate at the time was to apply to the colonial government for a license to purchase a tract of land from local Native American inhabitants. Natives typically had notions of communal sharing of land resources and did not understand that by such sales the buyers intended to acquire the right to exclude the native sellers from all access to the land. As a result of disagreements, and at times violence, arising from differences between the way Dutch settlers and local indigenous tribes in present-day New York understood their relationship with land and subsequent rights of ownership, the local Dutch government required settlers to obtain a license, granting a particular settler the right to negotiate land transactions with natives over a determined land area. Ideally, only upon securing a deed from the land with the consent of local natives would the settlers be granted a land patent to the property.

=== Purchase ===
On December 2, 1680, Dutch traders Lambert Dorlandt and Jan Sybrant (Seberinge) applied to the New York colonial government for a license to purchase land in present-day Putnam County. According to local historians, Dortlandt and Sybrant "obtained a license... in October [of] 1687 permitting their purchase of a deed from the Native Americans then living in what is now Philipstown." Eventually, on July 15, 1691, Dortlandt and Sybrant secured from the local Wapppinger leaders a deed to a 15,000-acre tract of the "low lands" along the eastern bank of the Hudson River from the peak on Anthony's Nose to Pollepel Island, and east to a marked tree. The original boundaries of this tract appear to contain roughly half of modern-day Phillipstown, NY, including Garrison, Cold Spring, and Nelsonville. However, Dortlandt and Sybrant did not then themselves obtain a land patent from the Governor, instead, in 1697 they sold their deed (as signed by native leaders) to Adolphus Philipse, a wealthy merchant, who subsequently settled the land.

Adolphus was the second son of Frederick Philipse, the first Lord of the Manor of Philipsborough (later, the common spelling would change to "Philipsburg"), a Dutch immigrant to North America of Bohemian heritage who had risen to become one of the greatest landholders in New Netherland.

Shortly after purchasing it, Adolphus Philipse, whose residence was the Castle Philipse near North Tarrytown (now, Sleepy Hollow, New York), and who maintained only a bachelor shooting lodge on Lake Mahopac in the Highland Patent, opened the tract to tenant settlers. Thus began a policy that lasted throughout his lifetime and his heirs' so long as they owned the land, to rent rather than sell, a practice which led to stunted growth for two and a half centuries to come.

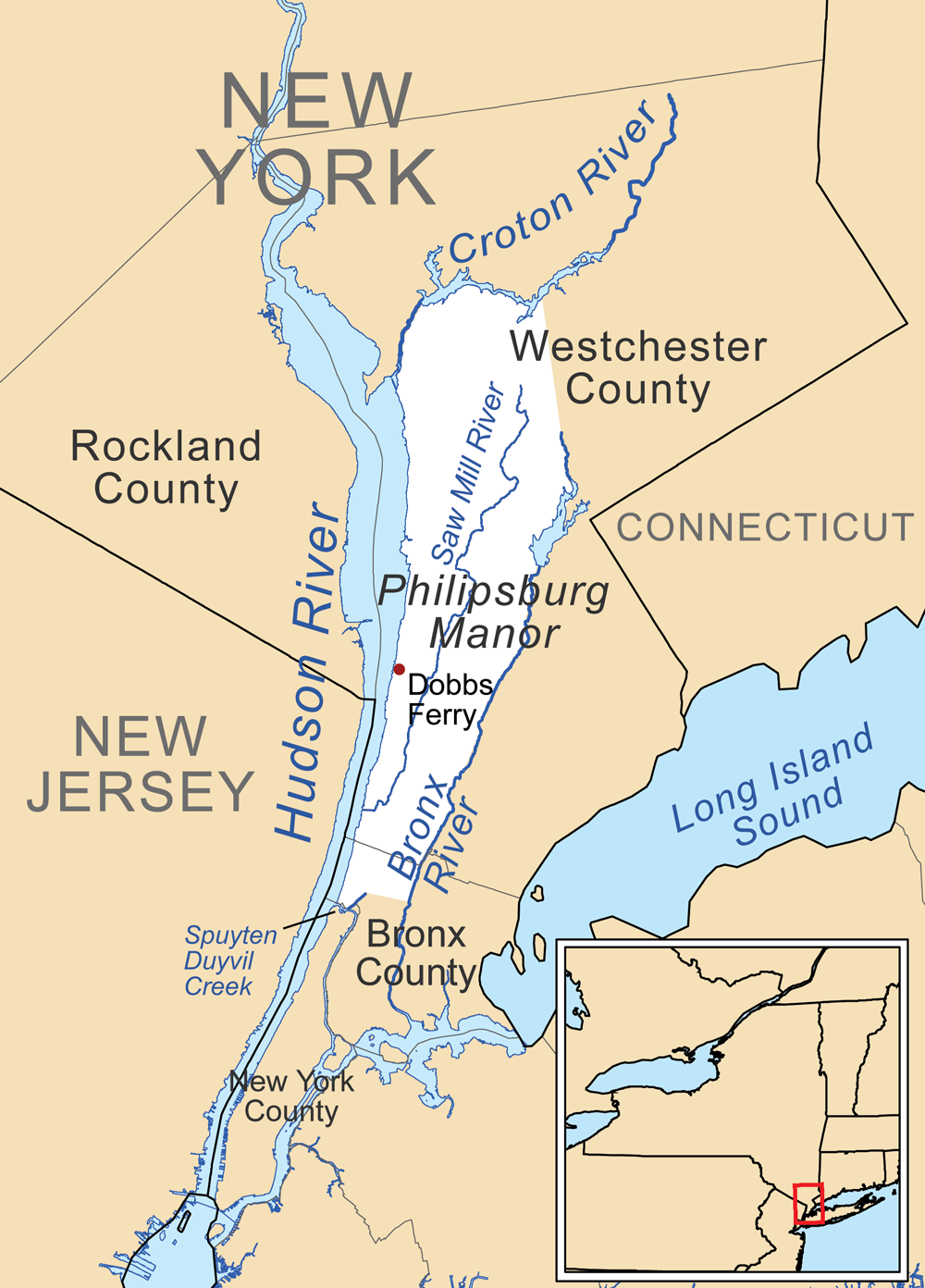
Map of Philipsburg Manor with current borders overlaid on the property

A surveying error during the establishment of the border between the provinces of New York and the Connecticut Colony resulted in a portion of a disputed tract known as The Oblong spanning the entire eastern border of the Patent. The proper boundaries were not resolved until a land swap between the then U.S. states late in the 18th century.

=== Inheritance ===
Upon Frederick's death in 1702, Adolphus inherited a partial share of the Manor's lands, which then amounted to over 80 square miles and encompassed the bulk of today's lower Westchester County. The title and balance of the lands passed to his nephew, Frederick Philipse II, whose father Philip, elder brother of Adolphus, had predeceased Frederick I.

=== Division ===
Adolphus Philipse died in 1750 (Smith, 1749), with his share of the Manor and the Highland Patent he had acquired on his own passing to Frederick II, his only heir-at-law. Upon Frederick II's death in 1751, the Manor went to his son Frederick Philipse III, while the Patent was divided among four of Frederick II's offspring: son Philip, and daughters, Susannah (wife of Beverley Robinson), Mary (wife of Col. Roger Morris), and Margaret, who died intestate.

By terms of her father's will Margaret's portion was then equally divided among her brother and sisters. Based upon a 1751 survey, the tract was geographically divided on the 7th of Feb 1754 into nine Lots as seen in the preserved undated pen and ink map: three on the river, three in the interior, and three on the eastern border abutting The Oblong. Each of the three heirs inherited a lot in each division.

=== Tenant uprising ===
Tenants in the Philipse Patent joined others throughout the Province of New York in rising against their landlords beginning in the early 1760s. This reached a peak in 1766, when a tenant in the northeast of Mary Philipse's center parcel, William Prendergast, fomented a small army of 2,000 men to forcibly wrest freedom from paying rent on the lands they occupied. It marched on New York City, where it petitioned the colonial Governor Sir Henry Moore to intercede, who refused, and – seemingly – defused the unrest.

The landlords, however, incited by the uprising, pressured Moore to dispatch 300 soldiers north to restore order, defeat the rebels, and capture their leader. Royal grenadiers were dispatched from Poughkeepsie, and, after skirmishes en route, resulting in several dead on each side, engaged Prendergast and 50 of his men at the Oblong Meeting House in the Gore, earning their surrender. Ultimately, Prendergast was tried in New York City, convicted of treason, and sentenced to be hanged.

He was to be executed on September 28, 1766. However, with the aid of the presiding judge, Chief Justice Daniel Horsmanden, Pendergast's wife, Mehetibel Wing Pendergast, was able to persuade Governor Moore to seek a king's pardon. It was granted by His Majesty George III, in the belief that clemency would have a more beneficial effect in quelling the dispute and restoring respect for authority among the citizenry than punishment.

=== Seizure ===
The Philipse family were Loyalists during the American Revolution. As such, their lands were attained by the Provincial Congress of New York in 1779. The largest family landholder, Frederick III, the third and final Lord of Philipsburg Manor, had Philipsburg Manor and other lands in today's Westchester County seized by the Commissioners of Forfeitures.

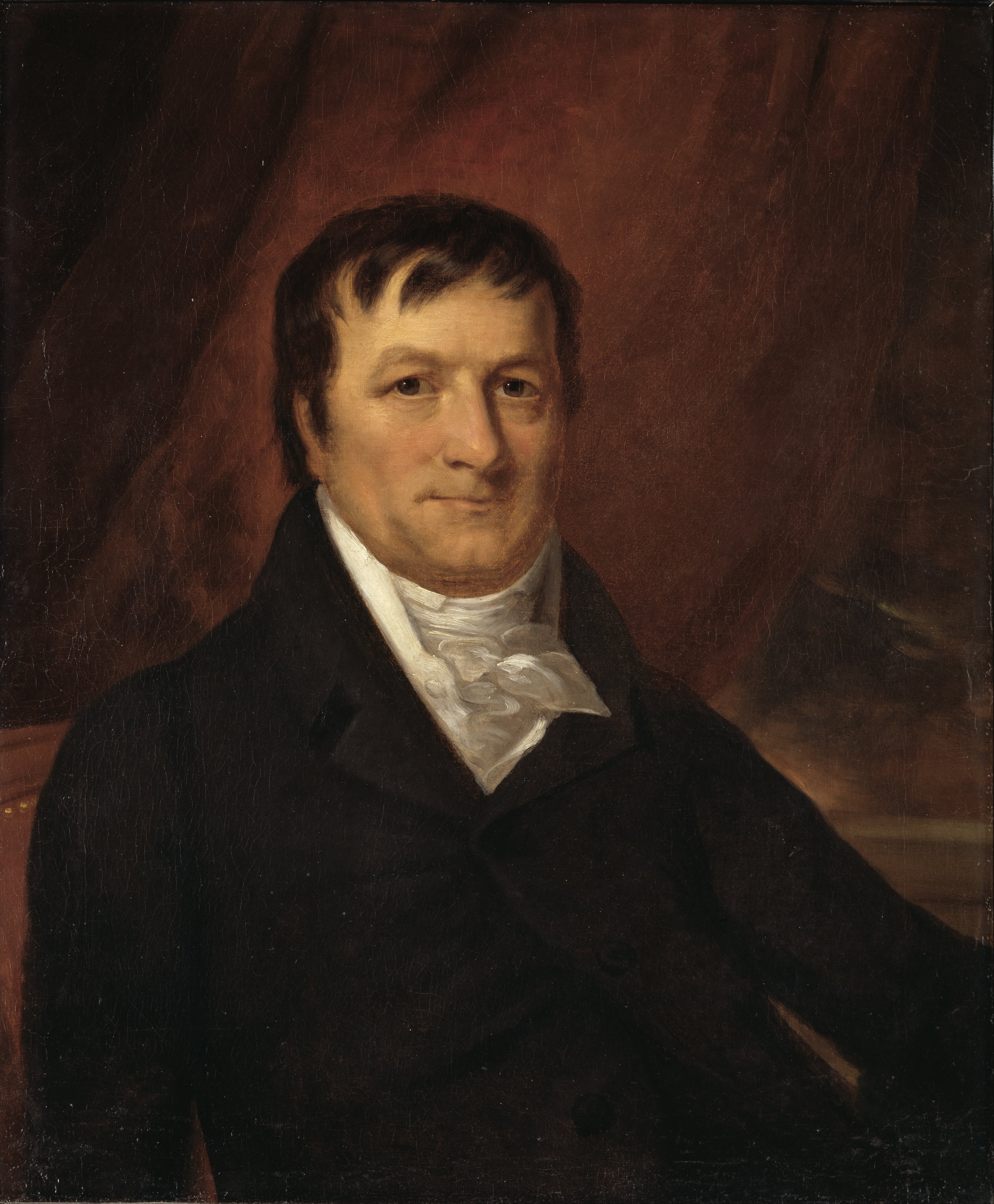
John Jacob Astor purchased the rights to Mary Philipse's share of the Patent in 1809

Philipse family holdings belonging to other members, principally the Highland Patent divided among Philip Philipse, Mary Philipse Morris, and Susanna Philipse Robinson, were also seized by the Commissioners. Several months later the sale of lands forfeited through attainder was ordered.

Sale was withheld during the war, as its outcome was uncertain, since confiscated lands had been pledged as collateral against monies borrowed by the provisional government to finance the conflict, and tenants lobbied for the right of preemptive purchase of leased land.

The sale proceeded after the Revolution ended. Several thousand acres of the Philipse estate were sold by the Commissioners of Forfeiture to the tenant farmers who worked on the land. In all, the lands were divided up into almost 200 different parcels, with the bulk of the holdings going to Dutch New York businessman Henry Beekman.

In spite of assurances of restitution in the 1783 Treaty of Paris signed with the British, and the enormous sum raised through the land sales – the better part of a quarter of a million pounds Sterling, with Philipse Manor accounting for nearly £235,000 – New York's Provisional Congress reneged and no compensation was forthcoming.

In 1787, a British court decided that the inheritance rights of heirs to property that was confiscated by the Americans during the American Revolution was recoverable. Under this decision, John Jacob Astor I purchased in 1809 the reversionary rights to those Philipse lands held by the heirs of Roger Morris (husband of Mary Philipse) for £20,000.

Unlike the Highland Patent holdings of heirs of Philip Philipse and Susanna Philipse Robinson, the Morris lands had been held in a life lease through a prenuptial agreement between Mary Philipse and Roger Morris, and had been found to have been protected from the 1779 attainder. After Mary Philipse Morris died in 1825, Astor attempted to collect rents on the lands, but the new “owners,” who had purchased from the lands from the Commission of Forfeiture, refused to pay, and Astor tried to evict them. A compromise was reached in 1828 when New York State compensated Astor for the reversionary rights in the amount of $561,500.

=== Incorporation ===
The Highland Patent had been incorporated into Dutchess County in 1737, where it was known as the "South Precinct".

In 1806, a very small portion north of the Hudson Highlands by the mouth of Fishkill Creek was split off from Philipstown (which had been established in 1788 out of the westernmost three and part of a fourth parcel of the Philipse Patent) and given to the Town of Fishkill. In 1812, the balance of the Philipse Patent was separated from Dutchess County and became today's Putnam County.

== Gallery ==
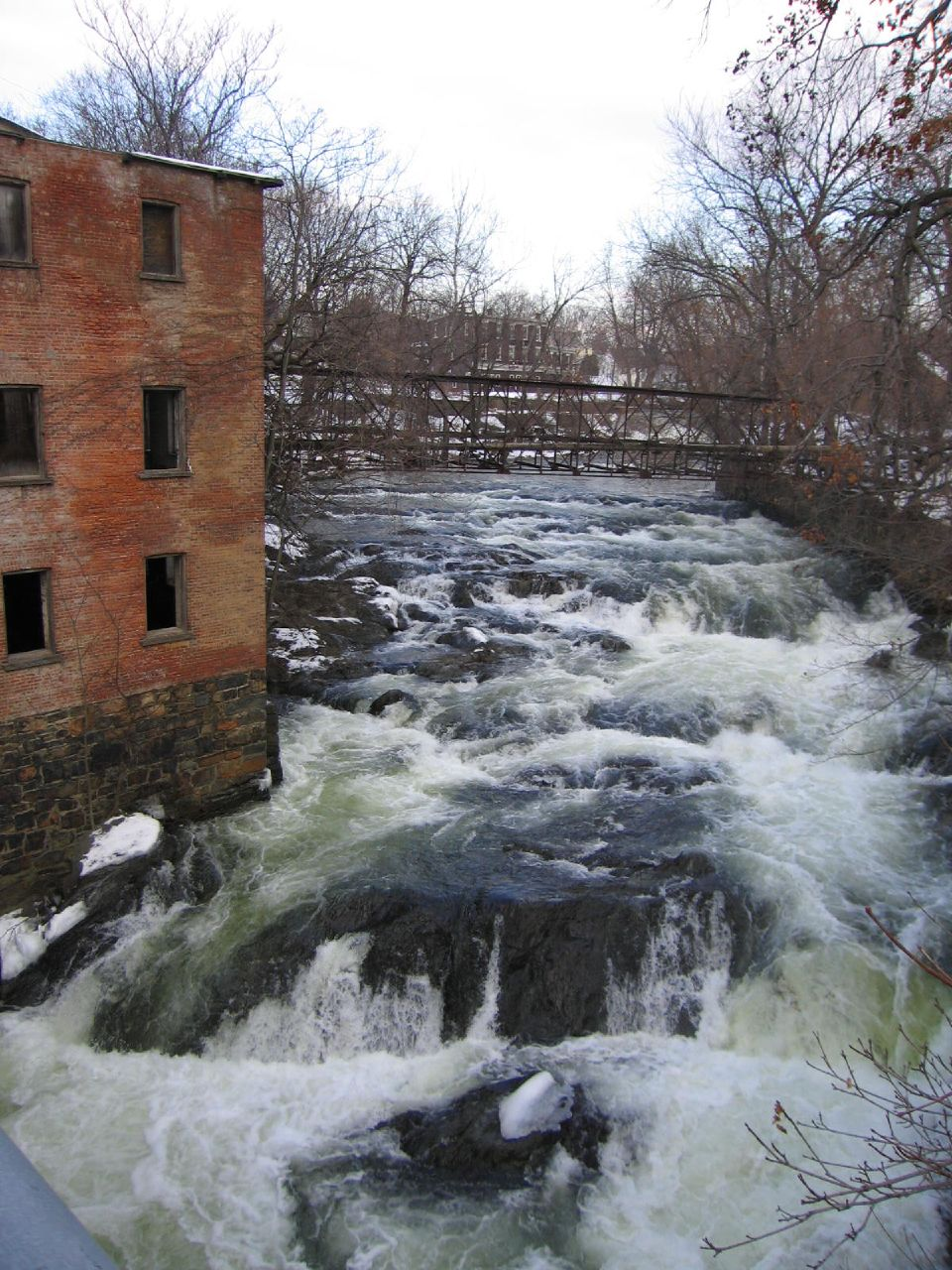
Fishkill Creek in Beacon in today's Dutchess County

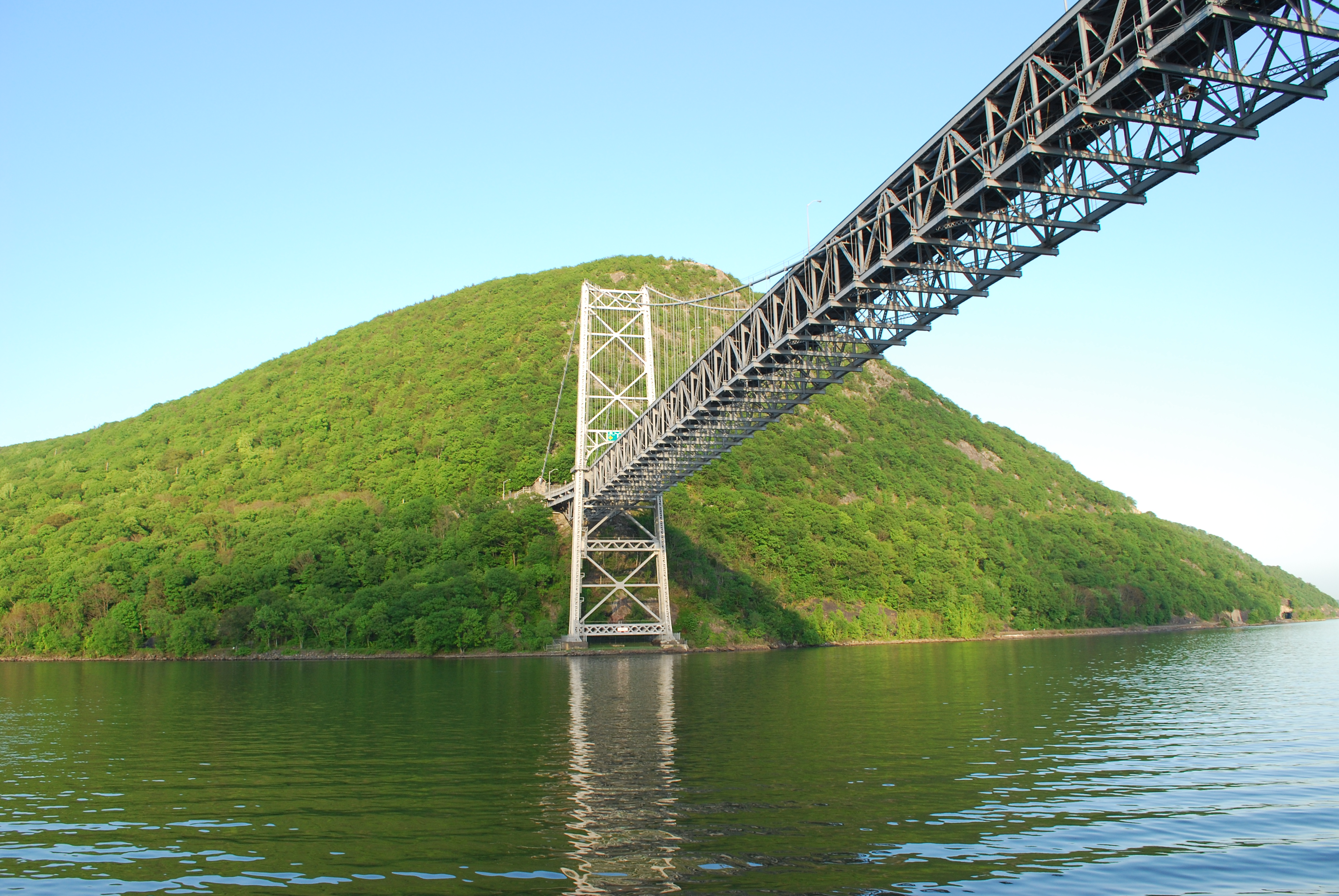
View from Hudson River with Bear Mountain Bridge in foreground

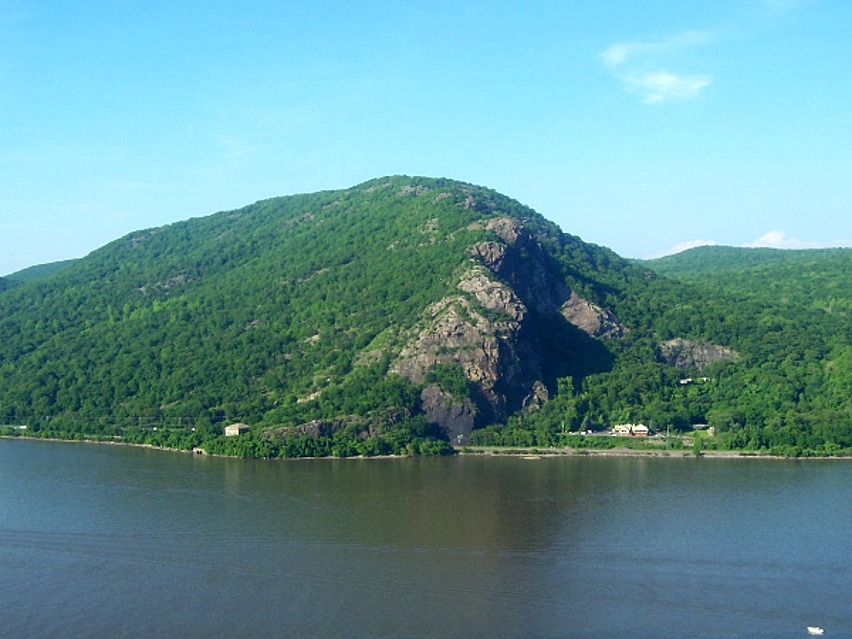
Breakneck Ridge is one of the most scenic features of the Hudson Highlands on the Patent's western extreme along the Hudson

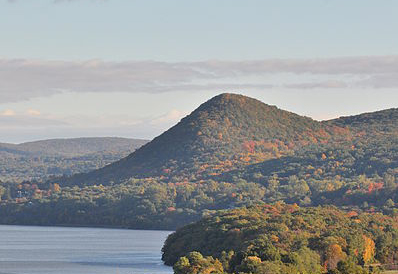
Sugarloaf Hill on the east bank of the river

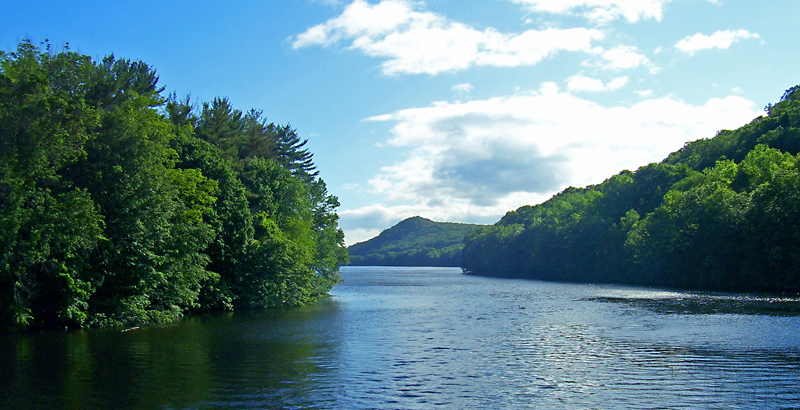
East Branch Reservoir in the town of Southeast

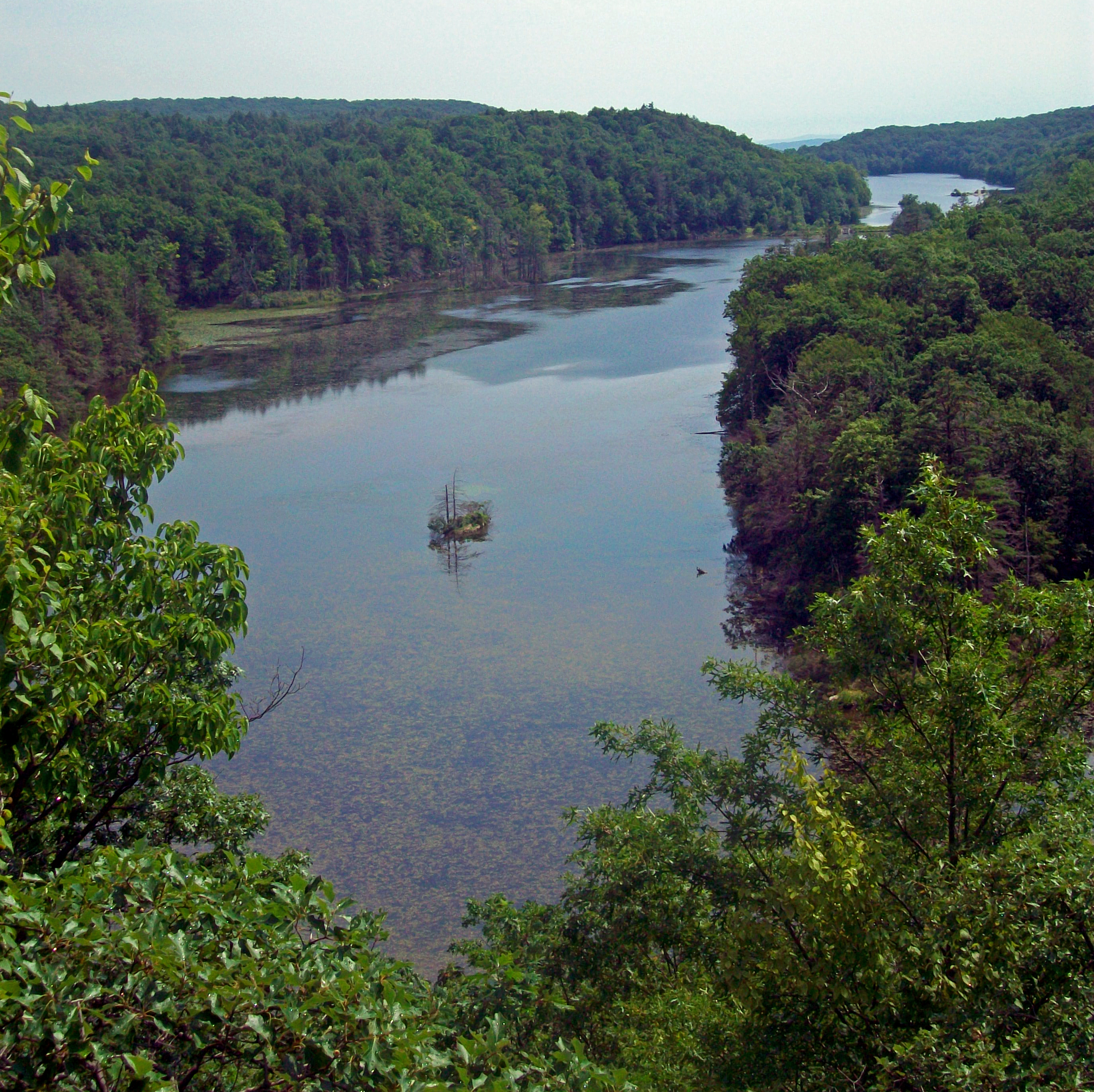
Canopus Lake in Clarence Fahnestock State Park

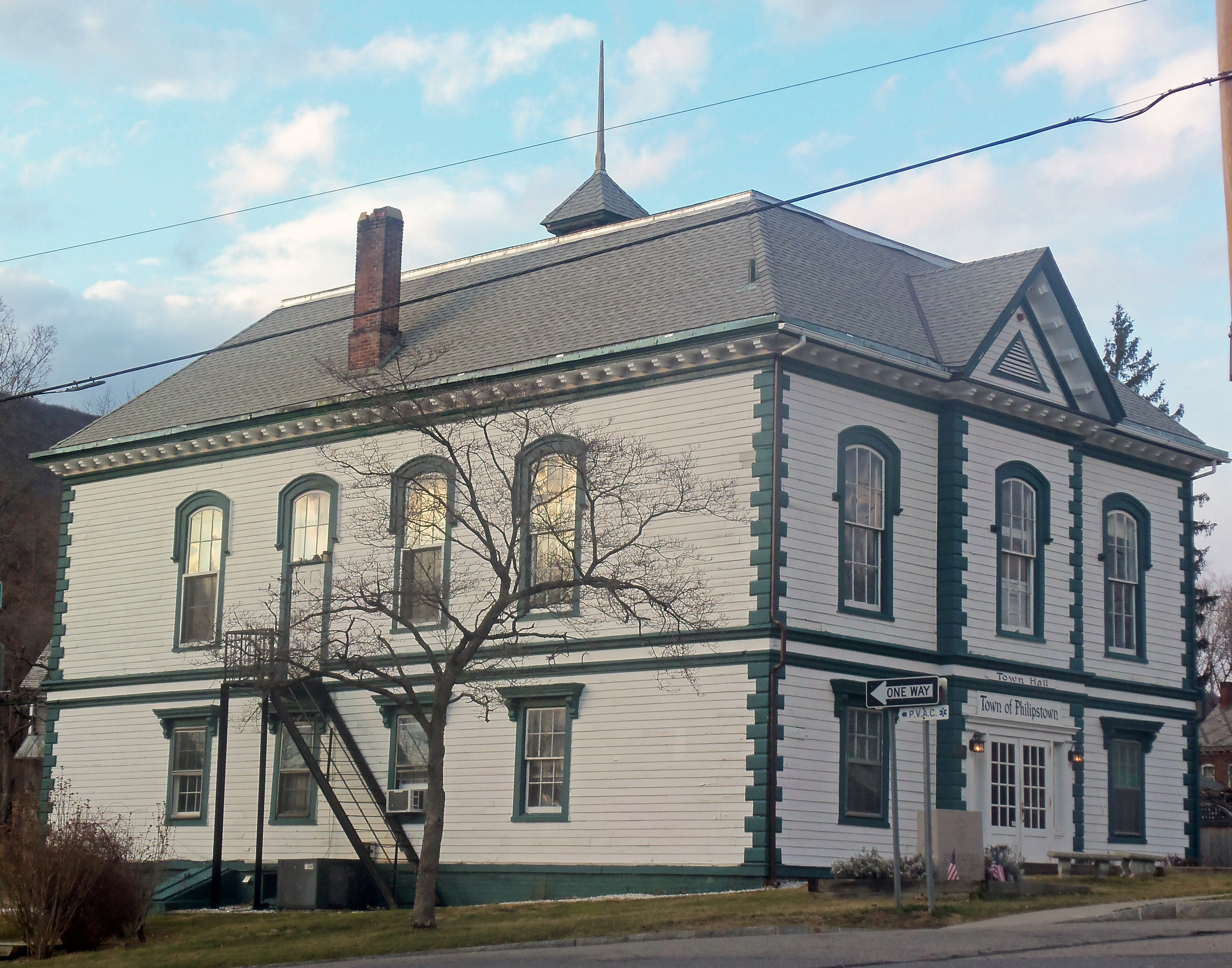
Philipstown town hall reflects the town's Dutch roots

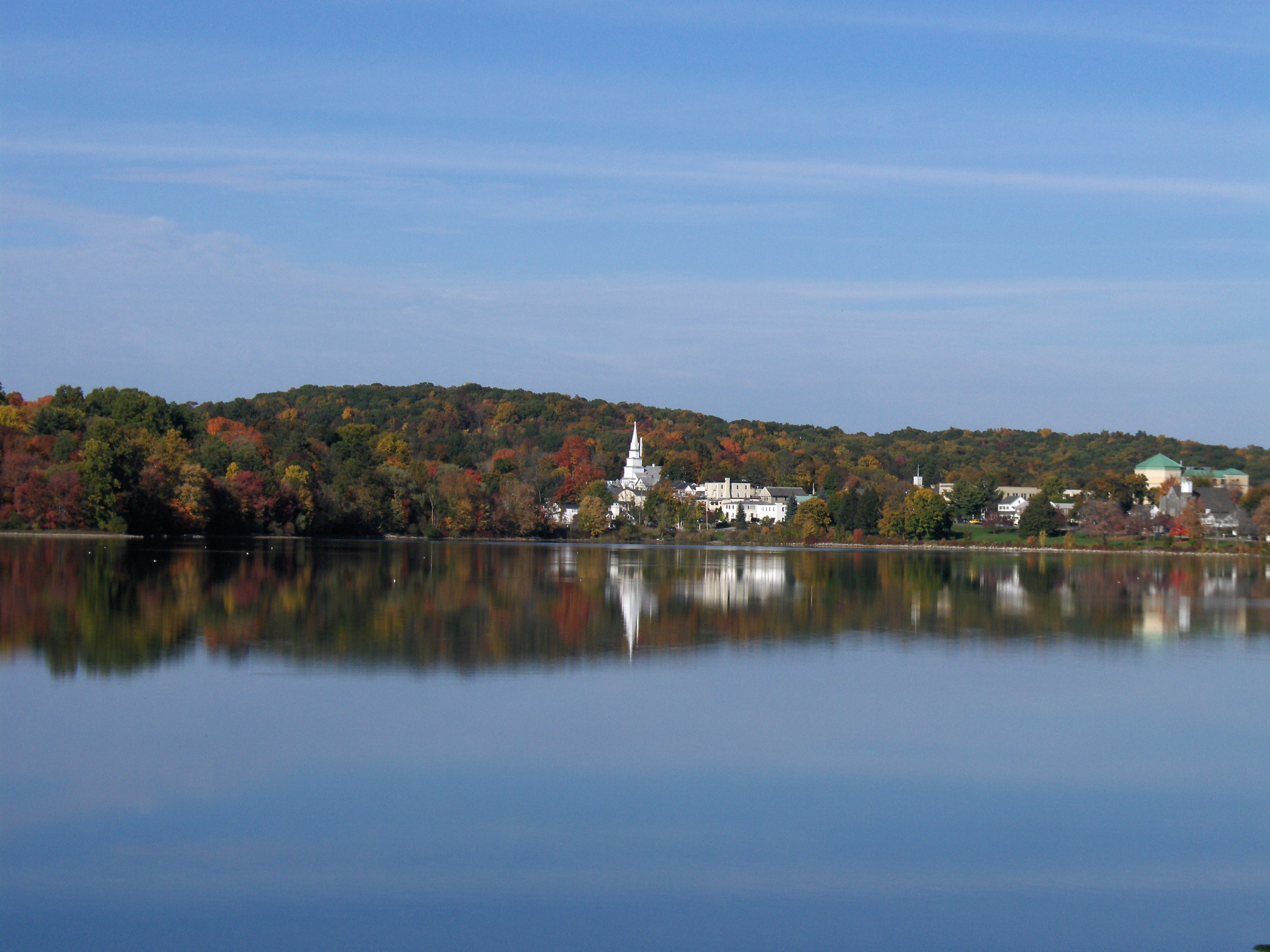
The hamlet of Carmel seen across Lake Gleneida from US Route 6

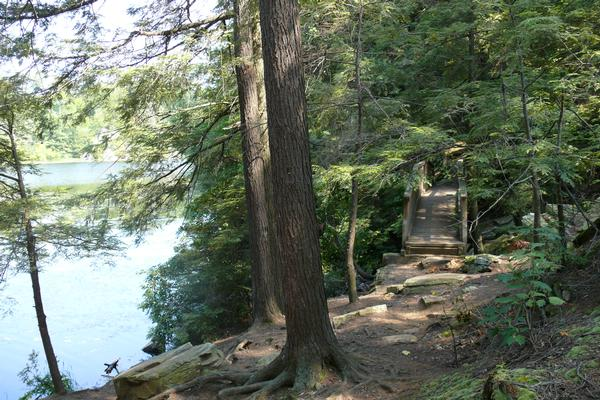
Pelton Pond in Fahnstock Park

== See also ==
- The Oblong
- Dutchess County land patents
