= Philipsburg Manor =

Manor in the Province of New York

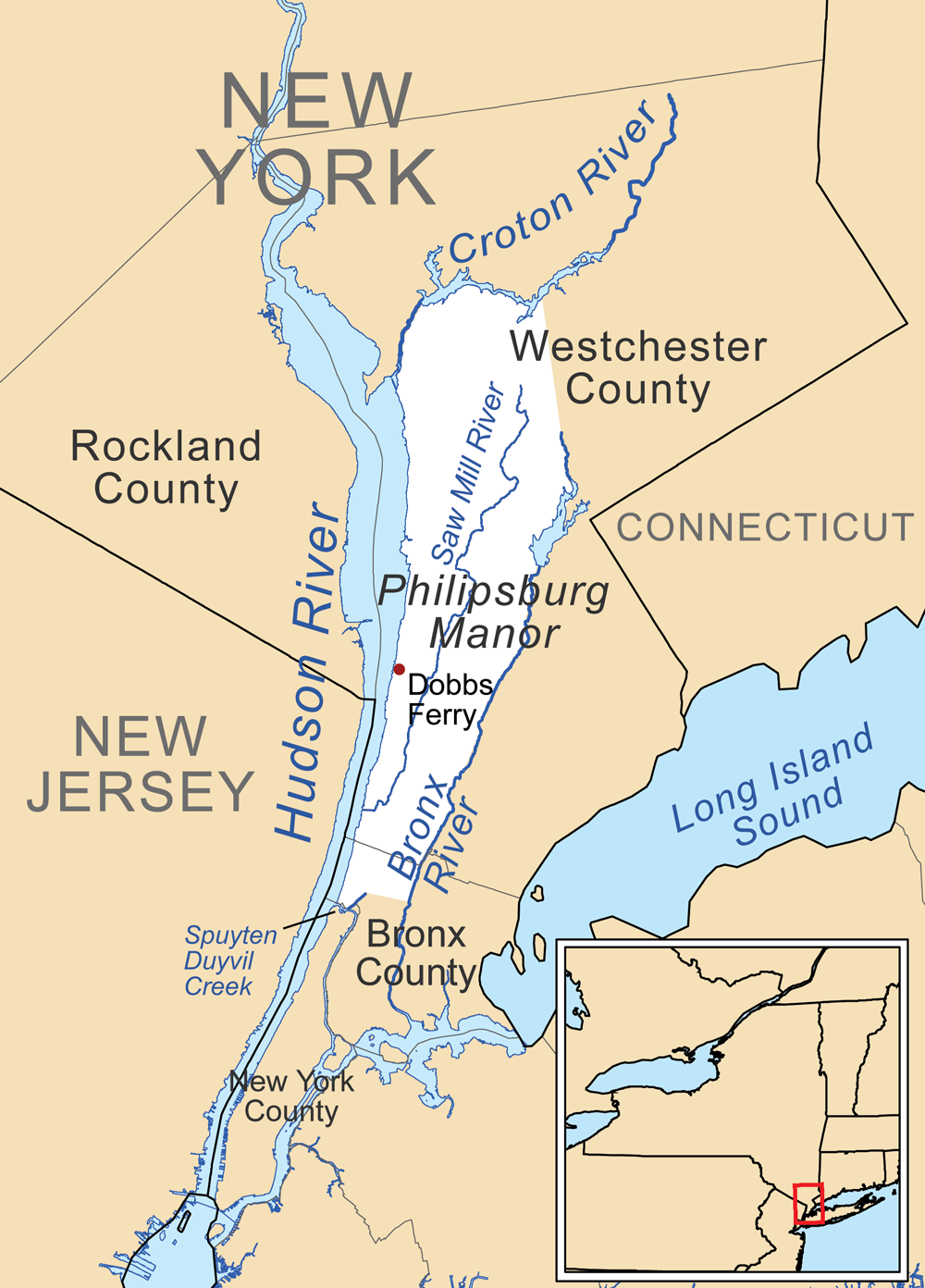
Map of Philipsburg Manor with current borders overlaid on the property

Philipsburg Manor (sometimes incorrectly referred to as Philipse Manor) was a manor located north of New York City in Westchester County in the Province of New York. Dutch-born Frederick Philipse I and two partners made the initial purchase of land that had been part of a Dutch patroonship owned by Adriaen van der Donck. Philipse subsequently bought his partners out and added more land before being granted a royal charter in 1693 for the 52,000 acres (21,000 ha) estate, becoming its first lord. By associating and collaborating with respectable merchants and prominent political figures on one hand and criminal elements—including pirates and slave traders—on the other, the Philipse family built a massive fortune.

After his death, the manor was split between his son and grandson, both of whom continued its development. Among the family's numerous enterprises, the Philipses engaged in the slave trade. Some of the victims of the slave trade they kept for themselves: while many families in colonial New York owned slaves, most possessed one or two house slaves; the Philipse family owned more than 120 enslaved men, women, and children.

The manor's property was confiscated during the American Revolution when Loyalist Frederick Philipse III, its third and final lord, was attainted for treason by New York's revolutionary government in 1779. The estate's land was used as collateral to raise money to fund the rebellion and later sold at auction. Some of the original structures still stand, including the Philipsburg Manor House in Sleepy Hollow, Philipse Manor Hall (the family seat) in Yonkers, and the Old Dutch Church of Sleepy Hollow, all of which are National Historic Landmarks.

== History ==
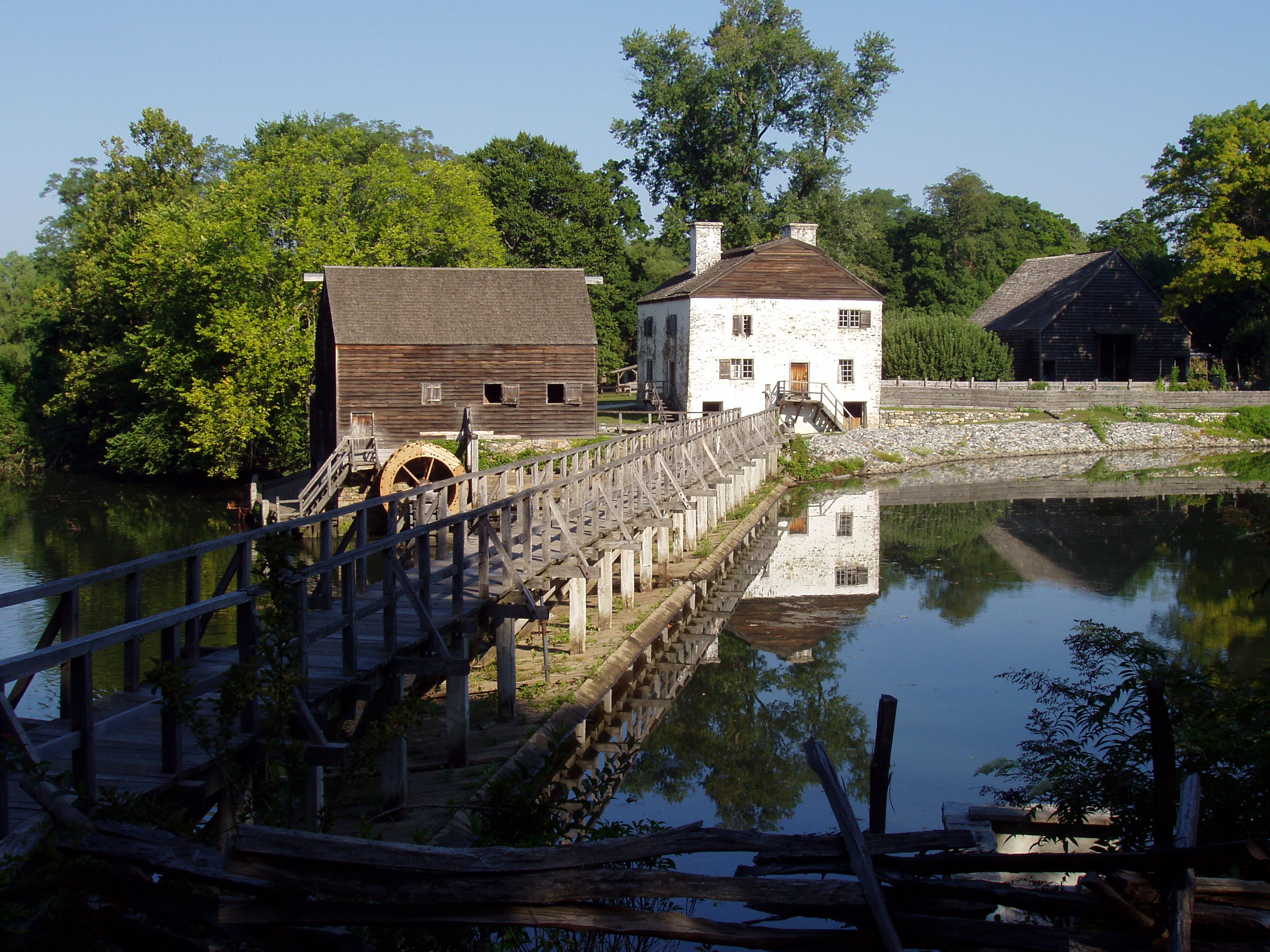
Philipsburg Manor House at the Upper Mills in today's village of Sleepy Hollow, New York

The land that would become Philipsburg Manor was first bought from Adriaen van der Donck, who had been granted a Dutch patroonship in New Netherland before the English takeover in 1664. Frederick Philipse I, Thomas Delavall, and Thomas Lewis purchased the first tracts in 1672 in current-day northern Yonkers. Philipse made several additional purchases between 1680 and 1686 from the Wiechquaeskeck and Sinsink Indian tribes, expanding the property both north and south. He also bought from Dr. George Lockhart a "meadow at Tappan," a land plot west of the Hudson River. This acquisition allowed Philipse to maintain a strategic economic foothold on the other side of the river, across from the greater part of his estate. The manor comprised about 52,000 acres (21,000 ha) of land. Philipse also bought out his partners' stakes during this time.

The estate's boundaries were the Spuyten Duyvil Creek to the south, the Croton River to the north, the Hudson River to the west, and the Bronx River to the east. Philipse was granted a royal charter in 1693, creating the Manor of Philipsburg (spelled as Philipsborogh in the royal charter) and making him first lord of the manor. Along with the three other main manors of the colony—Rensselaerswyck, Cortlandt, and Livingston—Philipsburg created one of the richest and most powerful families in the colony. When Philipse died in 1702, the manor was divided between his son, Adolphus Philipse, and grandson, Frederick Philipse II. Adolphus received the Upper Mills property, which extended from Dobbs Ferry to the Croton River. Frederick II was given the Lower Mills, which included the family seat, Philipse Manor Hall, at the confluence of the then Neperhan River (today's Saw Mill) and Hudson Rivers. The two parcels were reunited on his uncle's death. Frederick II's son, Frederick III, became the third lord of the manor in 1751.

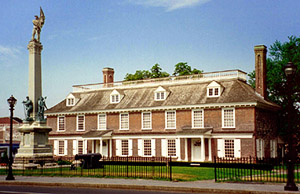
Philipse Manor Hall, the Lower Mills manor house, in today's Getty Square neighborhood of Yonkers

The British Parliament’s Bolting Act (enacted in 1678 and reinforced in 1680) granted New York City an exclusive monopoly on the "bolting" (sifting and milling) of wheat and corn and on the export of flour within the Province of New York. It led to a sharp rise in the Hudson Valley's demand for enslaved labor, and Frederick Philipse seized on the opportunity. In 1685, he imported about 50 slaves directly from Angola on his own ship. Subsequently, the Philipses used slaves to build and operate various structures at the Upper and Lower Mills.

The Upper Mills saw the building of two gristmills on the Pocantico River as well as a stone manor house, wharf, cooperage, and bake house. Most of the structures were completed by 1697, including the Old Dutch Church of Sleepy Hollow, now a National Historic Landmark. The Lower Mills saw a gristmill and Philipse Manor Hall built on the north bank of the Neperhan. The Philipses' aim was to make the manor a center for agriculture and trade, which was achieved, with enslaved Africans providing the essential labor that drove the manor’s industry.

In the 18th century, tenant farmers moved in from Great Britain, the Netherlands, France, Germany, and elsewhere within North America. The manor's tenant farmers grew wheat, which was by far the most valuable crop grown in colonial New York. They paid their rent in part by the grain they produced and were bound to bring all their grain to the manor's gristmills for grinding. By the beginning of the American Revolution in 1776, the population of Philipsburg Manor was about 1,000, up from 200 at the time of Frederick I's death. (Several of the original tenant houses survived to this day, including Sherwood House and Odell House.)

Several years into the Revolution Frederick Philipse III, a Loyalist, was attainted for treason along with his family. The manor was confiscated in 1779 and used as collateral to raise funds for the Colonial cause. After the war it was sold at public auction, split between 287 buyers. The largest tract, the (about 750 acres (300 ha)) Upper Mills, was purchased by Gerard Beekman; the lower, including Manor Hall, went to Cornelius Low. The larger Upper Mills area became the core of the modern-day village of Sleepy Hollow, while its main house and surrounding buildings were passed to numerous owners until 1951, when the lot was acquired by Sleepy Hollow Restorations (now Historic Hudson Valley). Philanthropist John D. Rockefeller Jr. funded the restoration of about 20 acres (8.1 ha), which became today's Philipsburg Manor House historic site. Philipse Manor Hall served as Yonkers City Hall from 1872 until 1908. Both homes became National Historic Landmarks on November 5, 1961 and are now house museums.

== Enslaved Africans' heritage ==
Both Philipse Manor Hall and Philipsburg Manor House are now parts of the African American Heritage Trail of Westchester County, a group of 16 sites which include the Rye African-American Cemetery, Saint Paul's Church National Historic Site and the Jay Estate.

== See also ==
- Philipse Patent
