= Philipse family =

Prominent Dutch family in New Netherlands

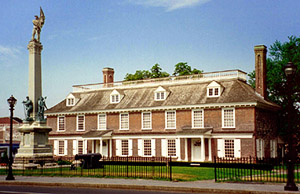
- Philipse Manor Hall State Historic Site
- Current region: New York
- Origin: Netherlands
- Connected families: Van Rensselaer family Schuyler family Livingston family

The Philipse family was a prominent Dutch family in New Netherlands and the British Province of New York. Its members owned both the vast 81 mi^{2} (210 km^{2}) hereditary estate in lower Westchester County, New York (Philipsburg Manor), and the roughly 250 mi^{2} (650 km^{2}) Highland Patent, later known as the "Philipse Patent" (today's Putnam County and parts of Dutchess County). Frederick Philipse, the first lord of Philipsburg Manor, was New York's richest man.

Among the family's numerous enterprises, the Philipses engaged in the slave trade. Some of the victims of the slave trade they kept for themselves: while many families in colonial New York owned slaves, most possessed one or two house slaves; the Philipse family owned more than 120 enslaved men, women, and children. Loyalists during the Revolutionary War, the family had its lands seized in 1779 by the Revolutionary government of the Province of New York and sold by its Commissioners of Forfeiture. Though never compensated for their losses by the Colonial government, various family members did receive payments from the British government in following years.

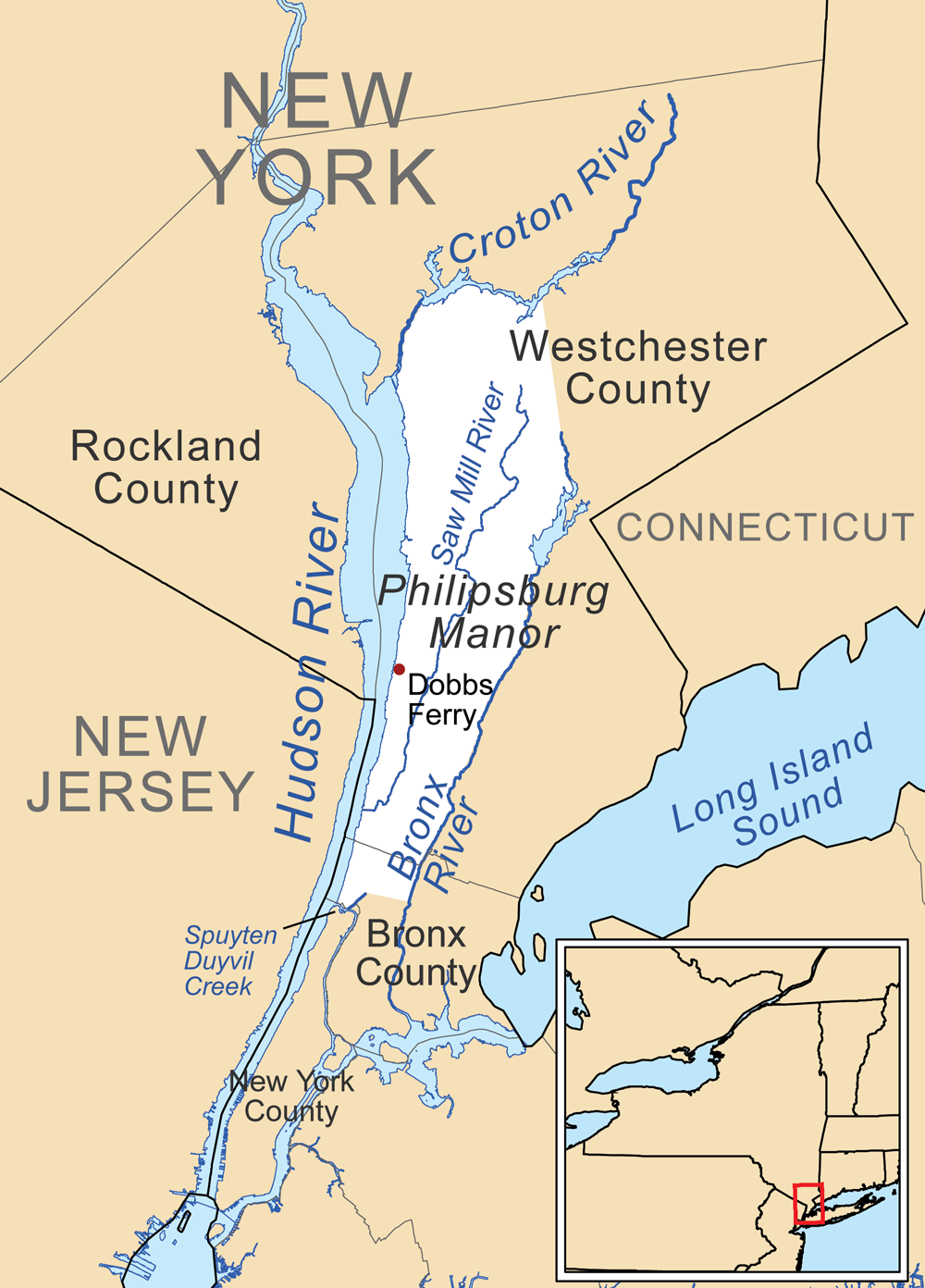
Map of Philipsburg Manor with current borders overlaid on the property

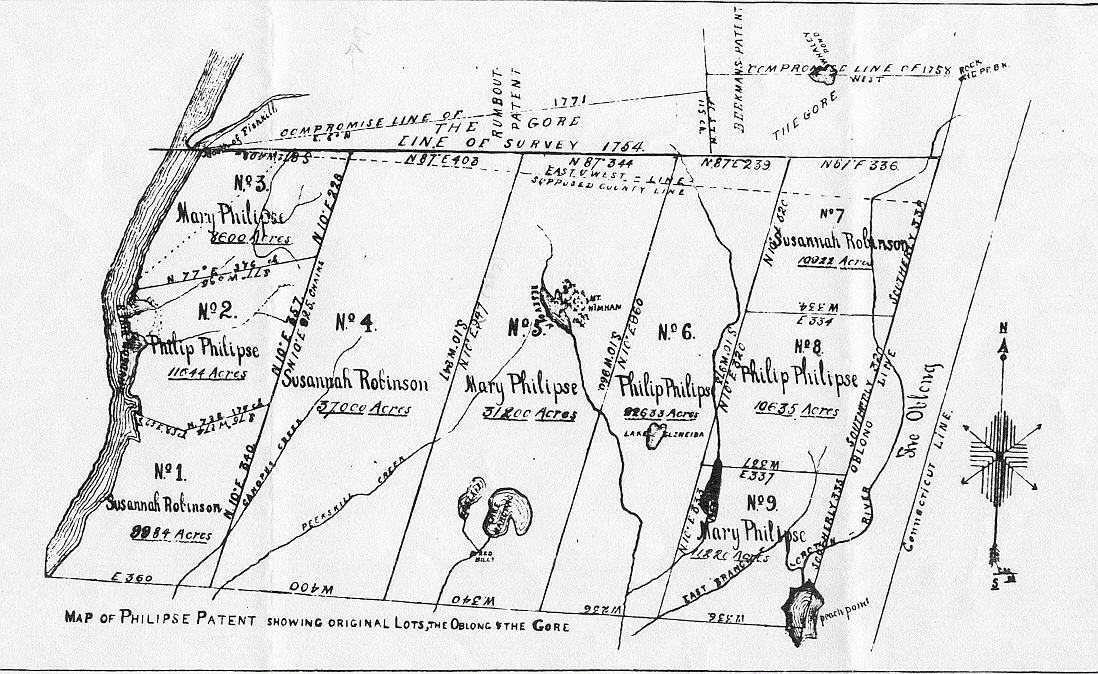
Map of Philipse Patent (showing the Oblong and the Gore)

== History ==
The Philipse family is of Bohemian origin. According to Supreme Court Justice John Jay, (whose maternal grandmother, Eva de Vries, had been adopted by Frederick Philipse upon his marriage to Margaret Hardenbroeck): "Frederick Philipse, whose family, originally of Bohemia, had been compelled by popish persecution to take refuge in Holland, whence he had emigrated to New York." Frederick Philipse (1636–1702), first lord and founder of Philipsburg Manor, had eleven children with his first wife, Margaret Hardenbrook de Vries. She died in 1691. A year later, Frederick married the widow Catharine Van Cortlandt Derval, who survived him for many years.

She was the sister of Stephanus Van Cortlandt, an adviser to the provincial governor. Her brother Jacobus Van Cortlandt married Frederick's adopted daughter Eva and their son Frederick Van Cortlandt later built the Van Cortlandt House in Van Cortlandt Park in the Bronx, New York. Jacobus and Eva's daughter, Mary, was the mother of John Jay by her marriage to Peter Jay.

== Family residences ==
The Philipse name is today most commonly associated with the two manor houses in Westchester County, New York (Philipse Manor Hall and Philipsburg Manor House). However, Frederick Philipse I was first and foremost a prominent and active merchant of New Amsterdam (renamed New York during his lifetime), and that is where he lived and conducted business. His primary residence was located in the Financial District of Lower Manhattan, on the corner of Markvelt (now Whitehall Street) and Breuers Straet (now Stone Street). The lot was granted to him by Peter Stuyvesant in 1658.

As evidenced by his will, his Manhattan property included not just a residential building, but also his primary counting-house (office), several warehouses for his international trade business, and a "bolting house" for processing flour. His being a carpenter by trade, it is likely that he drew plans for them himself and oversaw their construction. Even after he was granted the lordship of Philipsburg Manor in Westchester in 1693, his will confirms that he was still living in this Manhattan house. He left "the house in New York where I now live" to his grandson, Frederick Philipse II.

His son, Adolphus Philipse, owned a house on New Street, also in Manhattan's Financial District, where he primarily resided. He also had a hunting lodge near Lake Mahopac in present-day Putnam County, which was part of his Highland Patent.

Philipse I built two manor houses on Philipsburg Manor, one in southern Westchester County (on the Lower Mills segment of the manor) and the other in central Westchester (on the Upper Mills segment of the manor). The Upper Mills House, fortified against possible attacks by the local Native American tribes, was initially called Philipse Castle. The Westchester houses were occupied by the Philipses mostly during their supervisory trips to oversee the operations at the two Mills properties or as stopovers on upstate trips (such as visiting relatives at Van Cortlandt Manor). Philipse's grandson, Frederick Philipse III, converted the Lower Mills house into a mansion and made it his primary country residence.

The Manhattan buildings were demolished during the 19th century, when the Financial District was rebuilt; no records remain of what they looked like. After all Philipses’ properties were confiscated and sold by New York’s revolutionary government, the Lower Mills manor hall passed through the hands of several owners and later served as the first Yonkers City Hall, while the Upper Mills manor house became a private residence of the Beekman family.

Both Westchester houses are now museums. The Philipse Manor Hall State Historic Site is owned and operated by the New York State Office of Parks, Recreation and Historic Preservation. The Philipsburg Manor House is owned and operated by the non-profit Historic Hudson Valley.

In the Upper Mills segment of Philipsburg Manor, Frederick Philipse I had designed, financed, and constructed a stone church, now known as the Old Dutch Church of Sleepy Hollow. He, his two wives, and most of their children are buried there, in a family crypt under the floorboards of the church.

== Principal offspring ==
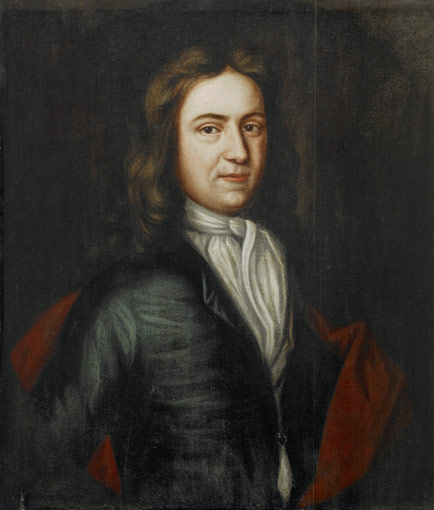
Adolphus Philipse (1665-1749), second son of Frederick, inherited part of the Philipsborough Manor and purchased the Highland Patent. Today known as the Philipse Patent, it became modern Putnam County, New York.

- Adolphus Philipse: In 1697 Adolphus, Frederick's second son, purchased a tract from Dutch traders which received British Royal sanction as the "Highland Patent." Subsequently known as the "Philipse Patent", the roughly 250 mi^{2} (650 km^{2}) parcel extended eastward from the Hudson River at the northern border of Westchester County some 20 or so miles to the Colony of Connecticut.
- Philip Philipse, the eldest and heir to the Manor, hereditary title, and family commercial holdings, died in either 1699 or 1700. By predeceasing his father, the legacy that would have gone to Philip bypassed him and was distributed between Adolphus and Philip's son, Frederick Philipse II. By the terms of Frederick Philipse's last will and testament, dated 26 October 1700, proved 1702, Adolphus received all the Manor north of Dobb's Ferry, including the present town. He was also named proprietor of a tract of land on the west bank of the Hudson north of Anthony's Nose and executor of Philip's estate.
- Frederick Philipse II, son of Philip Philipse, nephew of Adolphus. After the bachelor Adolphus' death in 1749 (Smith, others 1750), his Manor holdings and the Highland Patent passed to Frederick Philipse II, his only heir-at-law, who became the second Lord of the Manor at Philipsborough.
- Frederick Philipse III, eldest son of Frederick II. On Frederick II's death in 1751 all Manor holdings and the title went to Frederick Philipse III, the third and final Lord of the Manner of Philipsburg. The Highland Patent – today's Putnam County, New York – was divided among Frederick II's surviving offspring, son Philip Philipse, and daughters, Susannah (wife of Beverley Robinson), Mary (wife of Col. Roger Morris), and Margaret (who died intestate in 1752, her share being divided among the other three). Frederick III leased the entirety of his property to local landowners, the last of whom was William Pugsley, before siding with the British in the American Revolution and in 1783, leaving New York City for England, where he spent the remainder of his life. On May 2, 1786, he was buried in Chester Cathedral. His memorial tablet in the cathedral's South transept reads, in part:
  Firmly attached to his Sovereign and the British Constitution, he opposed at the Hazard to his Life, the late Rebellion in North America; and for this Faithful Discharge of his Duty to his King and Country, he was Proscribed,—and his Estate, one of the largest in New York, was Confiscated by the Usurped Legislature of that Province.

== Other descendants ==
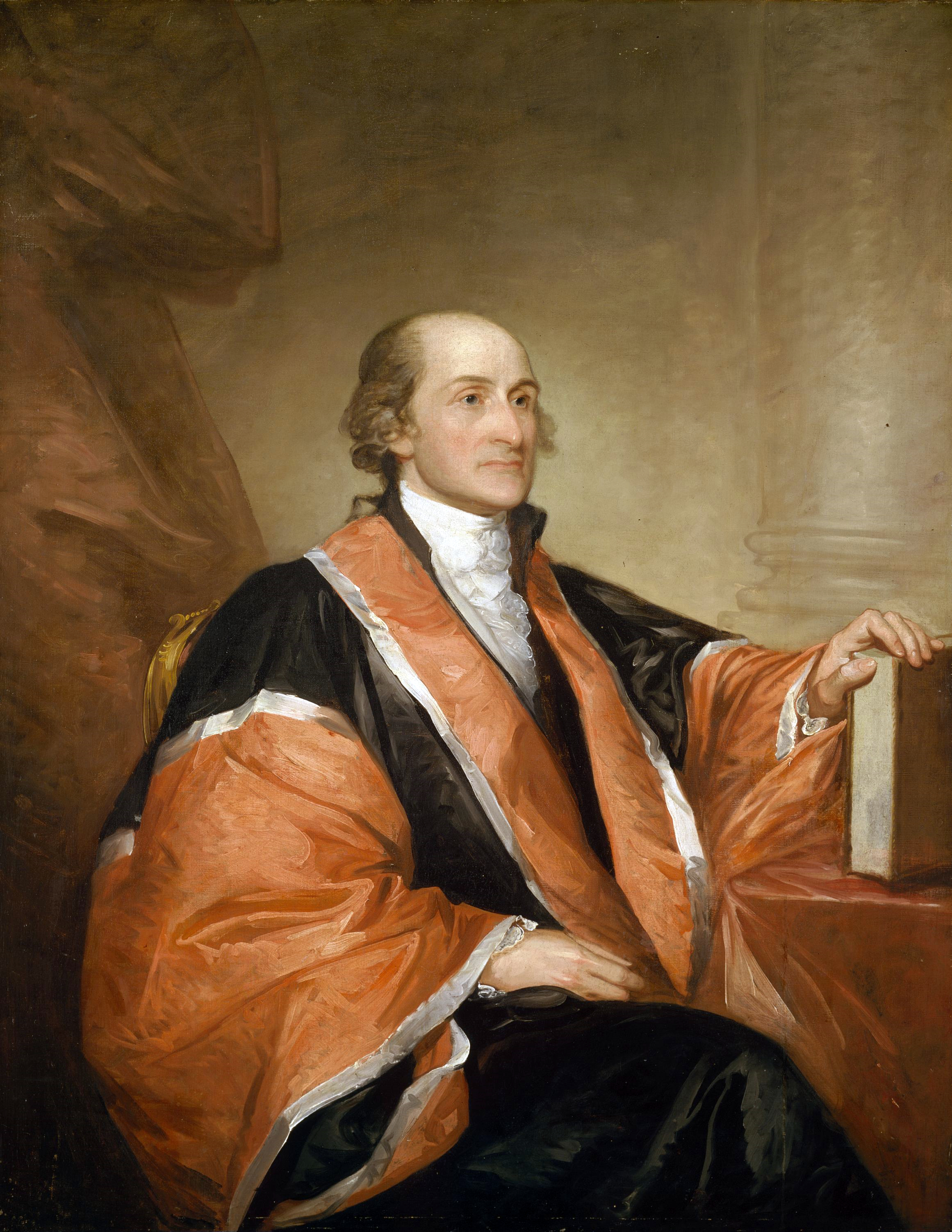
John Jay, 1st Chief Justice of the United States

- Eva Philipse, adopted daughter of Frederick Philipse I, born Eva de Vries 1660, married Jacobus van Cortlandt
- Margaret Philipse (b. 1733-1752), youngest daughter of Frederick II, heiress to one quarter of Philipse Patent, died intestate. Share redistributed to siblings Philip, Mary, and Susanna before 1754.
- Philip Philipse (1724–1768), son of Frederick Philipse II, partial heir to Philipse Patent.
- Susanna Philipse (1727–1822), eldest surviving daughter of Frederick Philipse II, married to Beverley Robinson, mother of Frederick Philipse Robinson, partial heiress to Philipse Patent. Possible romantic interest of George Washington.
- Mary Philipse (1730–1825) , middle surviving daughter of Frederick Philipse II, and possible early romantic interest of George Washington, loyalist, wife of British Colonel Roger Morris, owner of the Mount Morris in Manhattan. Partial heiress to Philipse Patent.
- Margaret Philipse (1733-1752), youngest surviving daughter of Frederick Philipse II and one quarter heir to the Philipse Patent, who died before it was passed on to her.
- Sir Frederick Philipse Robinson (1763–1852), son of Susannah Philipse and Colonel Beverley Robinson, who fought for England during the American Revolution.
- John Jay (1745–1829), delegate and president of Continental Congress, U.S. minister to Spain, 1st Chief Justice of the United States
- William Jay (1789–1858), prominent jurist and reformer, active abolitionist
- Henry Brockholst Livingston (1757–1823), Justice of US Supreme Court
- John Marshall Brown (1838–1907), Captain and assistant. adjunct. general of ME volunteers and served in SC and FL; commanded regiment at Totopotomy and Cold Harbor and preliminary movements a Petersburg, VA.
- Samuel Sprigg Caroll (1832–1893), military officer in Northern VA campaign and Battle Cedar Mountain; commandant brigade at battles of Fredericksburg, Chancellorsville and Gettysburg.
- Matthew Clarkson (1758–1825), major-general of NY State Militia; served with Gen. B. Lincoln until end of Revolutionary War, participated in siege of Savannah, defense of Charleston, present at surrender of Yorktown (1781).
- Alexander Slidell MacKenzie (1842–67), an officer in the United States Navy during the American Civil War and his brother General Ranald S. Mackenzie.
- Jay Pierrepont Moffat (1896–1943), notable American diplomat, historian and statesman who, between 1917 and 1943, served the State Department in a variety of posts, including that of Ambassador to Canada during the first year of United States participation in World War II.
- John Watts de Peyster (1821–1907), brigadiergeneral in the New York State Militia during the American Civil War and philanthropist and military historian after the war.
- Jonathan Mayhew Wainwright III (1864–1945), U.S. Congressman and Army officer in the Spanish–American War.
- Charlotte Margaret Philipse (Grand Daughter of Frederick Philipse II). Married Edward Webber, Lieutenant-General of the English military and lived in Wales.
- James Phillips Webber (1797–1877), son of Edward Webber and hence great grandson of Frederick Philipse II, obtained a grant of land in Paterson, NSW, Australia in 1822. He lived there until 1835, when he left the colony and eventually settled in La Maddalena, Sardinia, Italy, where he built Villa Webber (Villa Webber is named after him.) In 1943 Benito Mussolini was imprisoned in Villa Webber.
- John Phillips Webber (1800–1845), son of Edward Webber, also received a grant of land in New South Wales, Australia, and lived there for a while before returning to London, where he died in 1845.
- Edward Montgomery Affleck Webber (1802–1884), son of Edward Webber, lived in Wales all his life, in the Overton, Erbistock area.
