= Frederick Van Cortlandt =

American merchant and landowner

Frederick Van Cortlandt (1699 – February 2, 1749) was an American merchant and landowner.

== Early life ==
Coat of arms of Frederick Van Cortlandt

Van Cortlandt was born in 1699 and christened on April 23, 1699. He was the only surviving son born to Jacobus Van Cortlandt (1658–1739) and the former Eva de Vries Philipse (b. 1660). His older sister, Margaret Van Cortlandt, was married to Abraham de Peyster, a son of Abraham de Peyster, and his younger sister, Mary Van Cortlandt, was married to Peter Jay (the brother of Van Cortlandt's wife). Mary and Peter were parents of New York State Assemblyman James Jay, and John Jay, a Governor of New York and the 1st Chief Justice of the United States. His father served as the 30th and 33rd Mayor of New York City.

His paternal grandparents were Flemish born Annetje "Anna" (née Loockermans) Van Cortlandt, and Dutch born Captain Olof Stevense van Cortlandt, who arrived in New Amsterdam in 1637, a soldier and bookkeeper that rose to high colonial ranks through his work with the Dutch West India Company, eventually serving many terms as burgomaster and alderman. Among his extended family was uncle Stephanus van Cortlandt (who married Gertruy van Schuyler) and aunt Maria van Cortlandt (who married Jeremias van Rensselaer).

His maternal grandparents were Margaret (née Hardenbroeck) de Vries and Peter Rudolphus de Vries. After his biological grandfather's death, his grandmother remarried to Frederick Philipse, the 1st Lord of Philipsborough Manor (later, Philipsburg Manor), who adopted his mother Eva and changed her last name to Philipse upon their marriage (which produced another eleven children). After his maternal grandmother's death c. 1691, his adopted grandfather married his paternal aunt, Catherine (née van Cortlandt) Derval, the widow of Johannes Derval.

== Career ==
Upon his father's death in 1739, Frederick inherited all of his father's lands, known as Van Cortlandt Manor, which had been owned by his family since 1691 and expanded under his father's ownership. Frederick's father had established a wheat growing and processing business which included a saw mill, grist mill, and a fleet of draft boats that carried the flour from the south end of his lake down Tibbetts Brook and out to the Harlem and Hudson Rivers to market.

In 1748, Van Cortlandt began construction on a large family mansion that is today known as the Van Cortlandt House, the oldest surviving building in the Bronx.

== Personal life ==
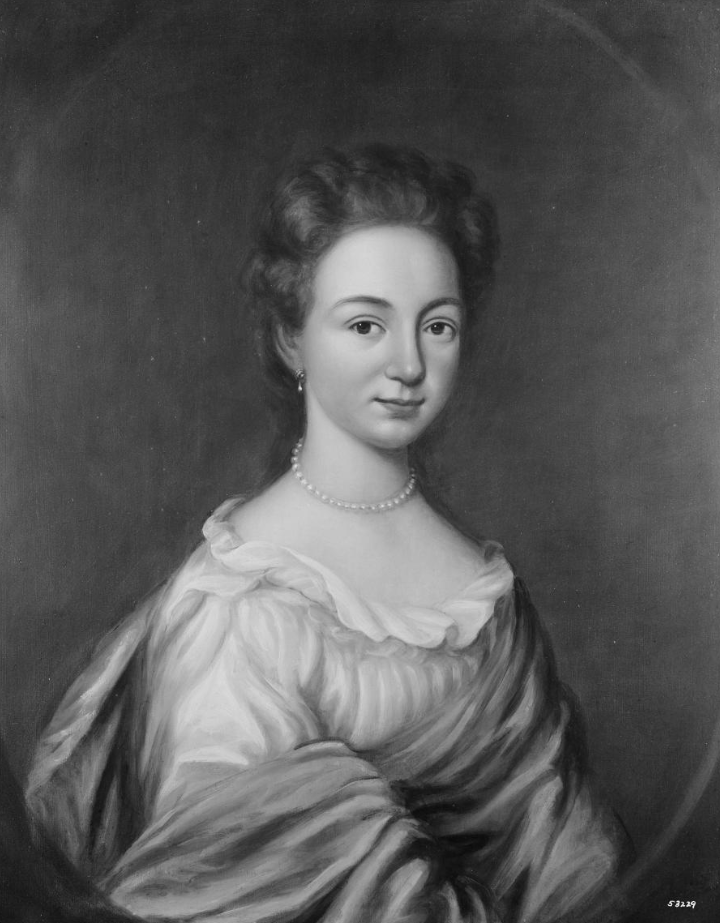
Portrait of Frederick's wife, Frances Jay (1701–1780)

On January 19, 1724, Van Cortlandt was married to Frances Jay (1701–1780), a daughter of Auguste Jay and Anne Marika (née Bayard) Jay. Together, they were the parents of:

- James Van Cortlandt (1727–1781), who married Elizabeth Cuyler (1731–1815), a daughter of Albany mayor Cornelis Cuyler.
- Augustus Van Cortlandt (1728–1823), who married Elsie Cuyler (1737–1761), also a daughter of Cornelis Cuyler, in 1760. After her death in 1761, he married Catherine Barclay (1744–1808), daughter of Andrew Barclay and Helena (née Roosevelt) Barclay. Augustus, a Loyalist, was the last Clerk of the City and County of New York under British rule.
- Frederick Van Cortlandt II (1730–1800), who did not marry.
- Eva Van Cortlandt (1732–1733), who died in infancy.
- Anne Van Horne (1736–1790), who married Nathaniel Marston III (1730–1759). After his death, she married Augustus Valette Van Horne (1736–1796).
- Eva Van Cortlandt (1737–1836), who married Henry White (1732–1786).

Van Cortlandt died on February 2, 1749, shortly before his house (which was left the house to his eldest son James) was completed. Frederick was buried at the family burial grounds established on what has today become known as Vault Hill in Van Cortlandt Park. After James' death in 1781, the house passed to Frederick's second son, Augustus.

=== Descendants ===
Through his son Augustus, he was the grandfather of Anne Van Cortlandt (1766–1814), who married her first cousin (also a grandchild of Frederick), Henry White Jr. (1763–1822), and Helen Van Cortlandt (1768–1812), who married James Morris (a son of Lewis Morris, signer of the Declaration of Independence). Through his granddaughter Anne, he was the great-grandfather of Helen Van Cortlandt White, the wife of Abraham Schermerhorn and mother of Caroline Webster Schermerhorn, who was well known in New York society during the Gilded Age for her marriage to William Backhouse Astor Jr.

Through his youngest daughter Eva, he was the grandfather of Margaret White (1774–1857), who married Peter Jay Munro (1767–1833), owner of Manor Park, Larchmont and a cousin and law partner of Peter Augustus Jay (eldest son of Frederick's nephew John Jay).

Through his daughter Anne, he was the grandfather of Mary (née Marston) Philipse (wife of Frederick Philipse, son of Philip Philipse and grandson of Frederick Philipse II, 2nd Lord of Philipsburg Manor); (Note: Frederick Van Cortlandt's paternal aunt, Catherine (née van Cortlandt) Derval (1652–1730), who in 1691 married his adopted maternal grandfather, Frederick Philipse, the great-grandfather of Mary Marston's husband, Frederick Philipse.) Frances (née Marston) Mongan-Warburton (wife of Terence Charles Mongan-Warburton), and Elizabeth (née van Horne) Clarkson (grandmother of Thomas Streatfeild Clarkson).

== See also ==
- Van Cortlandt family
