= Frederick Philipse III =

American politician

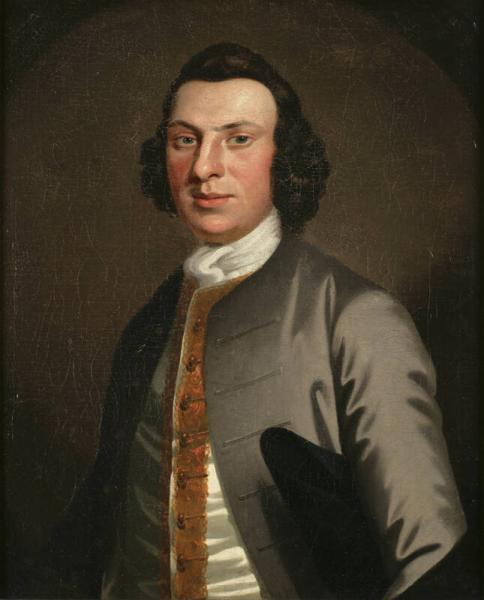

3rd Lord of the Philipsburg Manor
- In office 1751–1779
- Preceded by: Frederick Philipse II
- Succeeded by: Abolished

Personal details
- Born: September 20, 1720 New York City, Province of New York, British America
- Died: April 30, 1785 (aged 64) St. Oswald's Parish, Chester, England
- Spouse: Elizabeth Williams Rutgers (after 1764)
- Parent: Frederick Philipse II
- Relatives: Philip Philipse (grandfather); Percy Smythe, 6th Viscount Strangford (grandson)
- Occupation: Landowner, merchant

Frederick Philipse III (September 20, 1720 – April 30, 1785) was the third and last Lord of Philipsburg Manor, a 52,000 acres (21,000 ha) hereditary estate in lower Westchester County, New York, and a Loyalist during the Revolutionary War.

== Early life ==
Frederick Philipse III was the son of Frederick Philipse II (1698–1751), 2nd Lord of Philipsburg Manor, and Johanna Brockholst.

John Jay, a Founding Father of the United States who was the co-author of the Treaty of Paris and the Federalist Papers, as well as the first Chief Justice of the Supreme Court and second American Governor of New York, was a cousin, on his maternal side.

=== Family inheritance ===
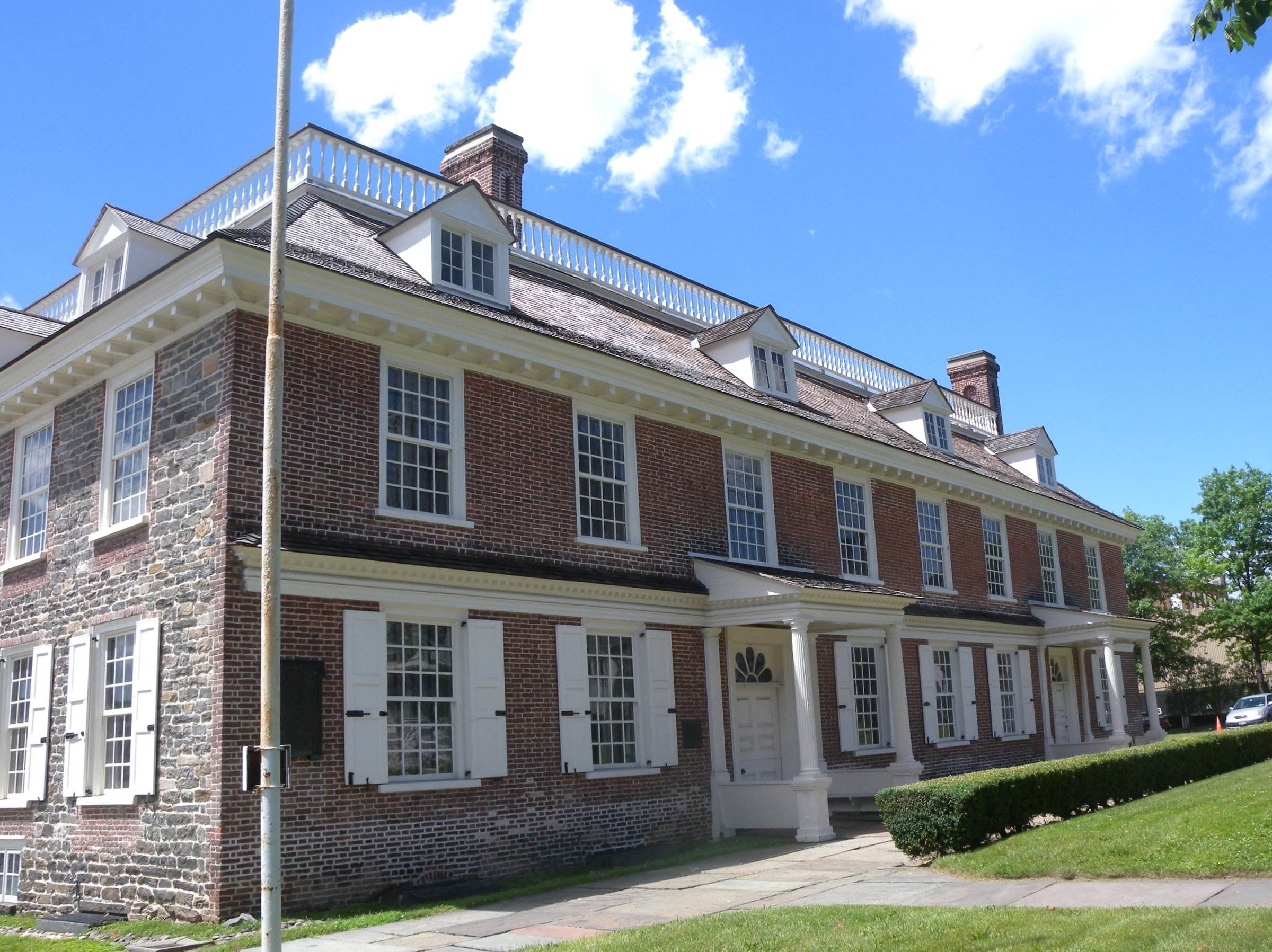
Philipse Manor Hall (the Lower Mills manor house) in Getty Square, Yonkers

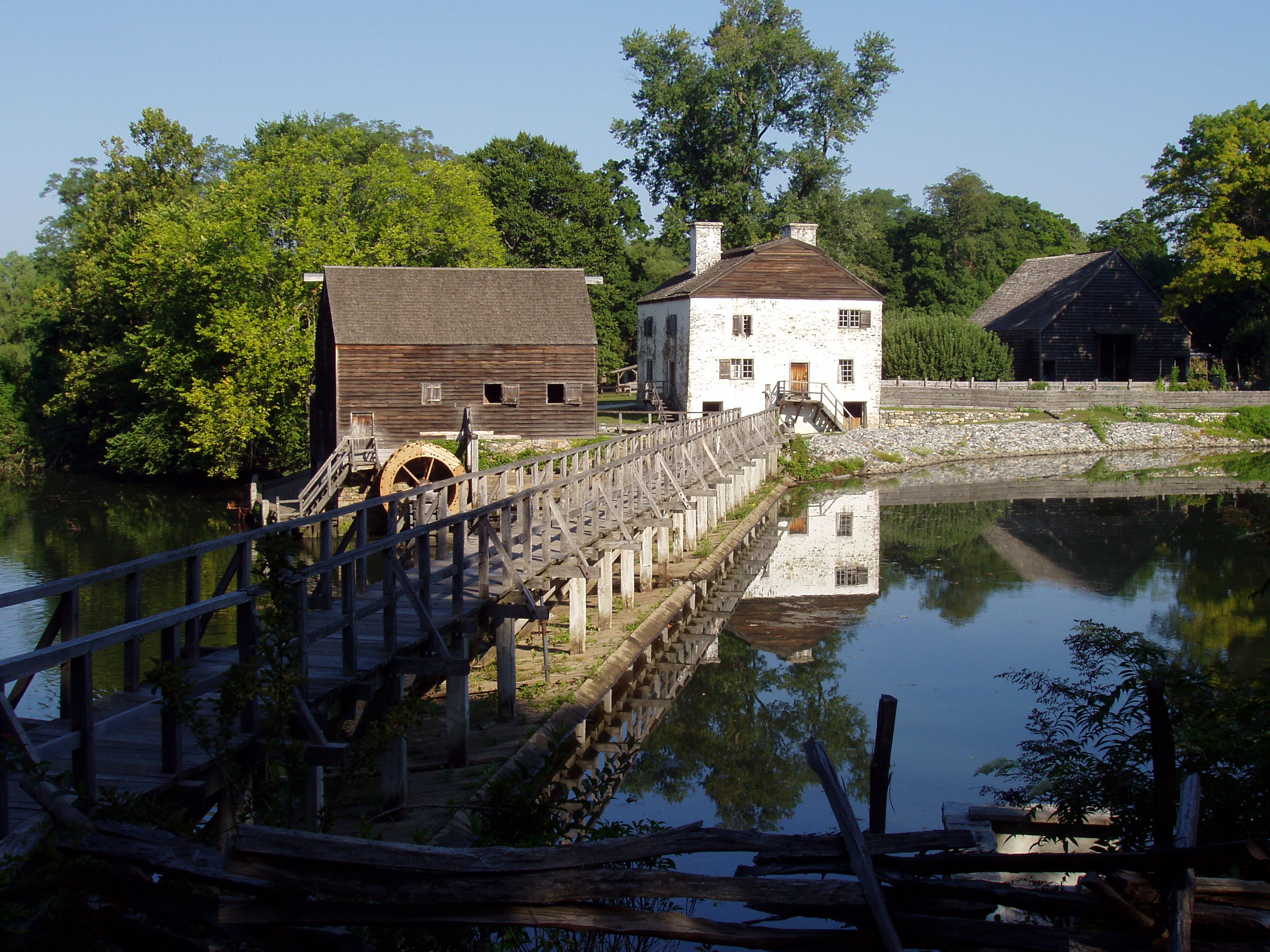
Philipsburg Manor House (the Upper Mills manor house) in Sleepy Hollow, New York

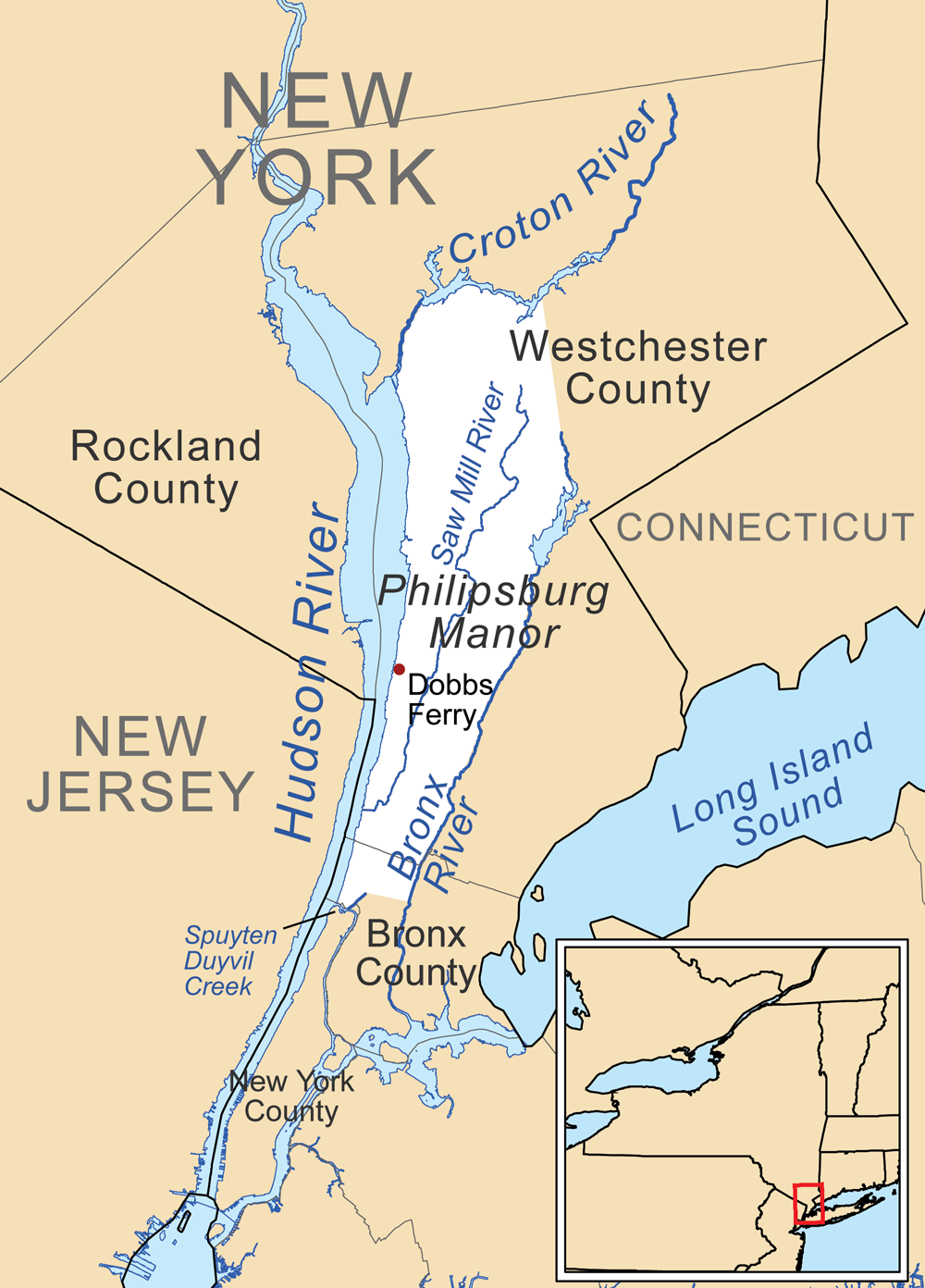
Map of Philipsburg Manor with current borders overlaid on the property

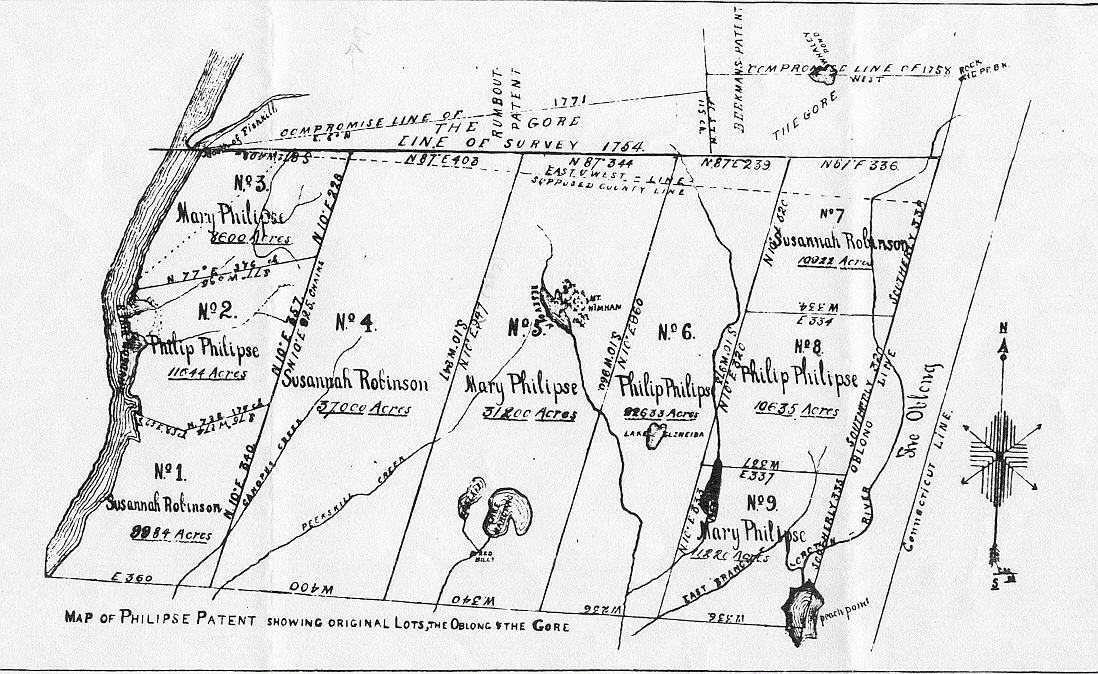
Map of Highland Patent (showing the Oblong and Gore)

When his father died in 1751, he inherited Philipsburg Manor, a 52,000 acres (21,000 ha) hereditary estate comprising much of southern Westchester County, the accompanying title, and commercial interests, including the share of family holdings his father had received from Adolphus Philipse, a bachelor uncle and son of Frederick I, the first Lord of Philipsborough (this is how Philipsburg was spelled originally, in the royal charter granted to Frederick I.)

Philipsburg Manor that he inherited consisted of two segments, each with a manor house: the Upper Mills, with Philipsburg Manor House, and the Lower Mills, with Philipse Manor Hall. Frederick Philipse III did not live at the modest Upper Mills house; he chose the manor house at the Lower Mills, which was much closer to New York City, as his primary country estate, developing it into a grand Georgian-style mansion suitable for a man of his status. Near the manor, he built a church, which would later become St. John's Protestant Episcopal Church of Yonkers, New York.

He did not receive his uncle's 250 mi^{2} (650 km^{2}) “Highland Patent”, a tract later known as the Philipse Patent, which became New York state's Putnam County and part of Dutchess County. It was divided among three of his siblings: Philip, Susannah (wife of Beverley Robinson), and Mary (wife of Col. Roger Morris).

According to historical research, Philipse III owned dozens of slaves.

== Career ==
Philipse was a member of the Assembly of the colonial Province of New York, and a Colonel in the militia.

=== American Revolution ===
Like the rest of his family, Philipse was a Loyalist during the American Revolution. He was arrested and imprisoned by Colonial authorities on August 9, 1776, on order of George Washington. After numerous charges and many travails he was paroled on December 23 by Governor Trumbull of Connecticut, where he had been held. In the spring of 1777 he warned the British garrison at Knightsbridge of an impending Colonial raid. His note was intercepted, causing Philipse and his family to flee to British-held New York City, never to return to their estate. There they moved into Philipse's large house at Whitehall and Stone Streets, where they spent the rest of the war. Philipse integrated himself and his wife into Loyalist society, purchased commissions in the British army for his five sons, and their daughters were "the talk of New York's winter balls as they had been in pre-war days". He was one of the prominent signers of the Declaration of Dependence, Loyalists' defiant rebuttal to the Declaration of Independence.

Victim of an effort led by his own cousin, John Jay, Philipse was attainted by the Provincial Congress of New York in 1779 and his Manor and other lands in today's Westchester County were seized. Several months later their sale was ordered.

Philipse family holdings belonging to other members, principally the Highland Patent, were also seized by the Commissioners of Forfeitures. Sale was withheld during the war, as its outcome was uncertain, confiscated lands had been pledged as collateral against monies borrowed by the provisional government to finance the conflict, and tenants lobbied for the right of preemptive purchase of leased land.

Sale proceeded after the Revolution ended. In spite of assurances of restitution in the 1783 Treaty of Paris signed with the British, and the enormous sum raised – the better part of a quarter of a million pounds Sterling – New York's Provisional Congress reneged and no payment from them was forthcoming. Later, it is claimed by Bielinski, Philipse was "compensated handsomely by the crown" for his loss. No amount was specified, only a prior reference by him to a royal pension granted Philipse for his "attachment to his majesty's government" that only reached 200 pounds by 1782, a minute fraction of the over 220,000 pound loss he had suffered via attainder.

Some 35,000 or so acres of the Philipse estate were purchased by some 200 tenant farmers who had previously worked their parcels, which averaged 170 acres apiece. In all, there were 286 new properties owners, 16 of which could be characterized as outside speculators, who acquired some six percent of the land. Two of these, however, acquired prime parcels, Cornelius Low the Manor Hall and Gerard Beekman the Upper Mills.

Historian Beatrice G. Reubens argues that the confiscation of Loyalist estates was a major reform for social and economic equality upstate New York. The state law of 1779 permitted attainted as well as patriot tenants on confiscatory lands to have the first right to purchase farms on which they resided. About 80 percent of the new owners of Philipsburgh Manor (Philipse Manor) were small farmers, most of whom had been tenants.

== Personal life ==
In 1764, Philipse was married to Elizabeth (née Williams) Rutgers, the 24-year-old widow of Anthony Rutgers. She was the daughter of Charles Williams, Esq., a naval officer for the Port of New York. Together, Elizabeth and Frederick were the parents of:

- Frederick Philipse, who married Henrietta Maria Griffiths of Rhent, North Wales
- Philip Philipse (d. 1829), an officer in the Royal Artillery
- Charles Philipse, who drowned in the Bay of Fundy
- John Philipse, Captain, who was killed in the Battle of Trafalgar in 1805
- Maria Eliza Philipse, who married Lionel, Viscount of Strangford (1753–1801), on September 4, 1779
- Sarah Philipse, who married Mungo Noble
- Charlotte Margaret Philipse (1772–1840), who married Irish-born Lieutenant Edward Webber (1761–1845) of England
- Elizabeth Philipse (d. 1828), died in Bath, England
- Catherine Phillips, who died young.

On April 30, 1785, at the age of 65, Frederick Philipse III died in St. Oswald's Parish in Chester, England, three years after the Treaty of Paris in 1783. After losing his New York holdings due to his loyalist stance during the American Revolution, Frederick III and his family relocated to the area, where he spent the remainder of his life. On May 2, 1786, he was buried in Chester Cathedral (most likely in the South transept, which was the parish church during that period). His memorial tablet in the transept reads, in part:

Firmly attached to his Sovereign and the British Constitution, he opposed at the Hazard to his Life, the late Rebellion in North America; and for this Faithful Discharge of his Duty to his King and Country, he was Proscribed,—and his Estate, one of the largest in New York, was Confiscated by the Usurped Legislature of that Province.

In 1787, a British court decided that the inheritance rights of heirs to property that was confiscated by the Americans during the American Revolution was recoverable.

== See also ==
- Philipse Patent
- Frederick Philipse II
- Dutchess County Land Patents
- The Oblong
