= Augustus Van Cortlandt =

American lawyer (1728–1823)

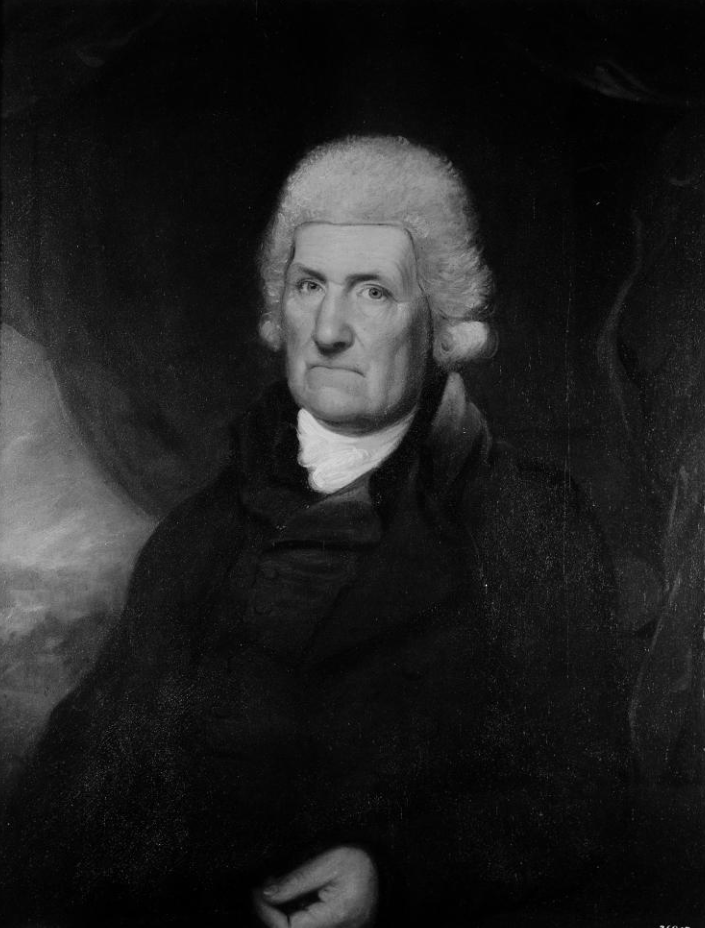

City Clerk of New York
- In office 1753–1783
- Preceded by: John Chambers
- Succeeded by: Robert Benson

Personal details
- Born: August 3, 1728 British America
- Died: December 20, 1823 (aged 95)
- Spouse(s): Elsie Cuyler (m. 1760; died 1761) Catherine Barclay (died 1808)
- Relations: Caroline Schermerhorn Astor (great-granddaughter)
- Children: Anne Van Cortlandt White; Helen Van Cortlandt Morris
- Parent(s): Frederick Van Cortlandt; Frances Jay

Augustus Van Cortlandt (August 3, 1728 – December 20, 1823) was an American lawyer who served as the last Clerk of the City and County of New York under British rule, who hid the city records at his family's estate manor house in 1776.

== Early life ==
Van Cortlandt was born in 1728 in British America. He was the second son of prominent New York merchant and landowner Frederick Van Cortlandt and Frances (née Jay) Van Cortlandt (1701–1780). His elder brother was James Van Cortlandt (who also married a daughter of Mayor Cornelis Cuyler). His younger siblings were Frederick Van Cortlandt II (who did not marry), Anne Van Horne (who married Nathaniel Marston III and Augustus Valette Van Horne), Eva Van Cortlandt (who married Henry White).

His maternal grandparents were Auguste Jay and Anne Marika (née Bayard) Jay. His father was the only surviving son of Jacobus Van Cortlandt, the 30th and 33rd Mayor of New York City, and the former Eva de Vries Philips. Among his first cousins were James Jay, a New York State Assemblyman, and John Jay, a Governor of New York and the 1st Chief Justice of the United States.

== Career ==
His father owned Van Cortlandt Manor, which had been in his family since 1691 and expanded under his grandfather's tenure. Upon his father's death in 1749, twenty-one year old Augustus inherited an enslaved person. After his elder brother James died in 1781, Augustus inherited his father's fieldstone and brick Georgian style manor, the Van Cortlandt House. The estate remained in the family until 1889 when they sold the property to the City of New York as part of Van Cortlandt Park's creation.

In 1751, he was admitted to the practice of law. In 1753, Van Cortlandt succeeded John Chambers to become Clerk of the City and County of New York, of which he was the last under British rule. During the Revolutionary War, Van Cortlandt "hid city records from the British by storing them in Vault Hill" on his family's estate in February 1776. They remained there until December but were returned to the city likely because the British were "apprised of their place of concealment." Van Cortlandt served as clerk until 1783, when he was succeeded by Robert Benson.

== Personal life ==
In 1760, Van Cortlandt married Elsie Cuyler (1737–1761), a daughter of Albany mayor Cornelis Cuyler. Elsie was a sister of Augustus' older brother's wife, Elizabeth Cuyler. After Elise's death a year later in 1761, he married Catherine Barclay (1744–1808), daughter of Andrew Barclay and Helena (née Roosevelt) Barclay of Saint Croix in the West Indies. Together, they were the parents of:

- Anne Van Cortlandt (1766–1814), who married her first cousin, Henry White Jr.
- Helen Van Cortlandt (1768–1812), who married James Morris, a son of Lewis Morris (a signer of the Declaration of Independence).

Van Cortlandt died in 1823. As he had no male heirs, his house and lands passed to his grandson, Augustus White. Under his 1823 will, which stipulated that "all who inherited the house would take Van Cortlandt as their family name," his grandson assumed the Van Cortlandt name. Upon his death in 1839, the house went to his fellow unmarried brother Henry who also assumed the Van Cortlandt name. Upon his death six months later, the house passed to his nephew, the thirteen year old Augustus Bibby Van Cortlandt (1826–1912). The New York City Parks Department took control of the house and grounds in 1888 following his deed of the mansion and sale of the land.

=== Descendants ===
Through his daughter Anne, he was the grandfather of Helen Van Cortlandt White (1792–1881), Augustus White Van Cortlandt (1794–1839), Augusta White (1794–1871), and Henry White Van Cortlandt (1802–1839). Neither of his grandsons married. Augusta married Dr. Edward Newenham Bibby and Helen married merchant Abraham Schermerhorn and was the mother of Caroline Webster Schermerhorn (1830–1908), who was well known in New York society during the Gilded Age for her marriage to William Backhouse Astor Jr.

Through his daughter Helen, he was a grandfather of Augustus Frederick Morris (1797–1859), who also assumed the surname of Van Cortlandt to inherit a part of his grandfather's estate in Lower Yonkers.
