= Philipsburg Proclamation =

18th-century historical document

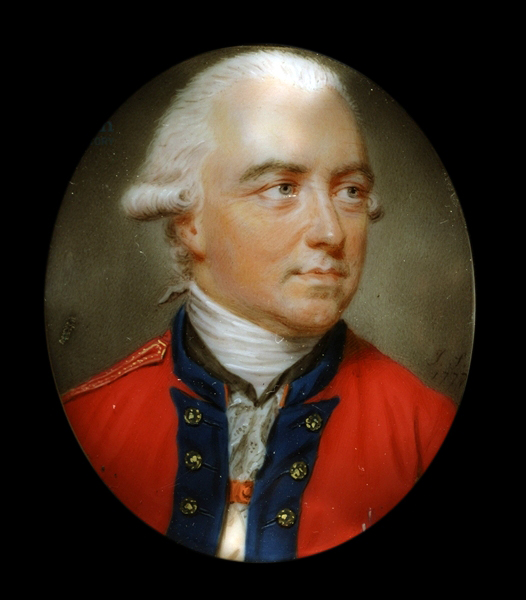
- 1777 portrait of Clinton by John Smart
- Created: 30 June 1779
- Author: General Sir Henry Clinton
- Purpose: To encourage specific slaves to run away and enlist in the British Armed Forces

The Philipsburg Proclamation was issued by British Army General Sir Henry Clinton on 30 June 1779 to encourage patriot-owned slaves to run away and enlist in the Royal Forces. The proclamation, now a historical document, followed after Dunmore's Proclamation in 1775 and the establishment of the Royal Ethiopian Regiment in Virginia.

== Text ==
General Clinton issued the following proclamation:

Whereas the enemy have adopted a practice of enrolling NEGROES among their Troops, I do hereby give notice That all NEGROES taken in arms, or upon any military Duty, shall be purchased for the public service at a stated Price; the money to be paid to the Captors.

But I do most strictly forbid any Person to sell or claim Right over any NEGROE, the property of a Rebel, who may take Refuge with any part of this Army: And I do promise to every NEGROE who shall desert the Rebel Standard, full security to follow within these Lines, any Occupation which he shall think proper.
Given under my Hand, at Head Quarters, PHILIPSBURGH the 30th day of June, 1779.

H CLINTON

== Background ==
The proclamation extended the scope of the effect of Dunmore's Proclamation on patriot slave owners. Dunmore's Proclamation was issued four years earlier by Virginia's last Royal governor, Lord Dunmore, granting freedom to any slaves in Virginia willing to serve the Royal forces. The new document was issued from Clinton's temporary headquarters at Philipse Manor Hall in what is now the city of Yonkers, New York; the house was then the country seat of the prominent Loyalist and slave owner Frederick Philipse III, the third (and last) lord of Philipsburg Manor. The document proclaimed all slaves who could travel to the British line in the newly-established United States belonging to American Patriots free, regardless of their willingness to fight for the British Crown. It further promised protection, freedom, and land to any slaves who left their masters.

The move was one of desperation on the part of the British, who realized that the Revolution was not going in their favor. In some ways, it was too 'successful' once so many slaves escaped (over 5,000 from Georgia alone) that Clinton ordered many to return to their masters.

The proclamation omitted mention of loyalist slave owners, essentially creating an exemption, one which the patriots exploited. In the beginnings of the Revolutionary War, patriots sometimes seized property of loyalists in order to pay down war debts, which sometimes included loyalist slaves. If a loyalists' slave promised to fight for patriot armies they would be afforded full freedom.

== Aftermath ==
The Treaty of Paris (1783) provided that all property including slaves would be returned to their rebel masters. However, the British commanders refused, and compensation was paid instead. About 3,000 former slaves were relocated to Nova Scotia, where they were known as Black Loyalists. Many continued on to Sierra Leone, where they established Freetown, its capital.

While the proclamation did create some success for British forces, the exemption of a promise of freedom for the slaves held by loyalists meant that some Loyalists who fled north to Canada during the Expulsion of the Loyalists took their slaves north with them.
