= Philipsburg Manor House =

Historic house in New York, United States

- Philipsburg Manor
- U.S. National Register of Historic Places
- U.S. National Historic Landmark
- New York State Register of Historic Places
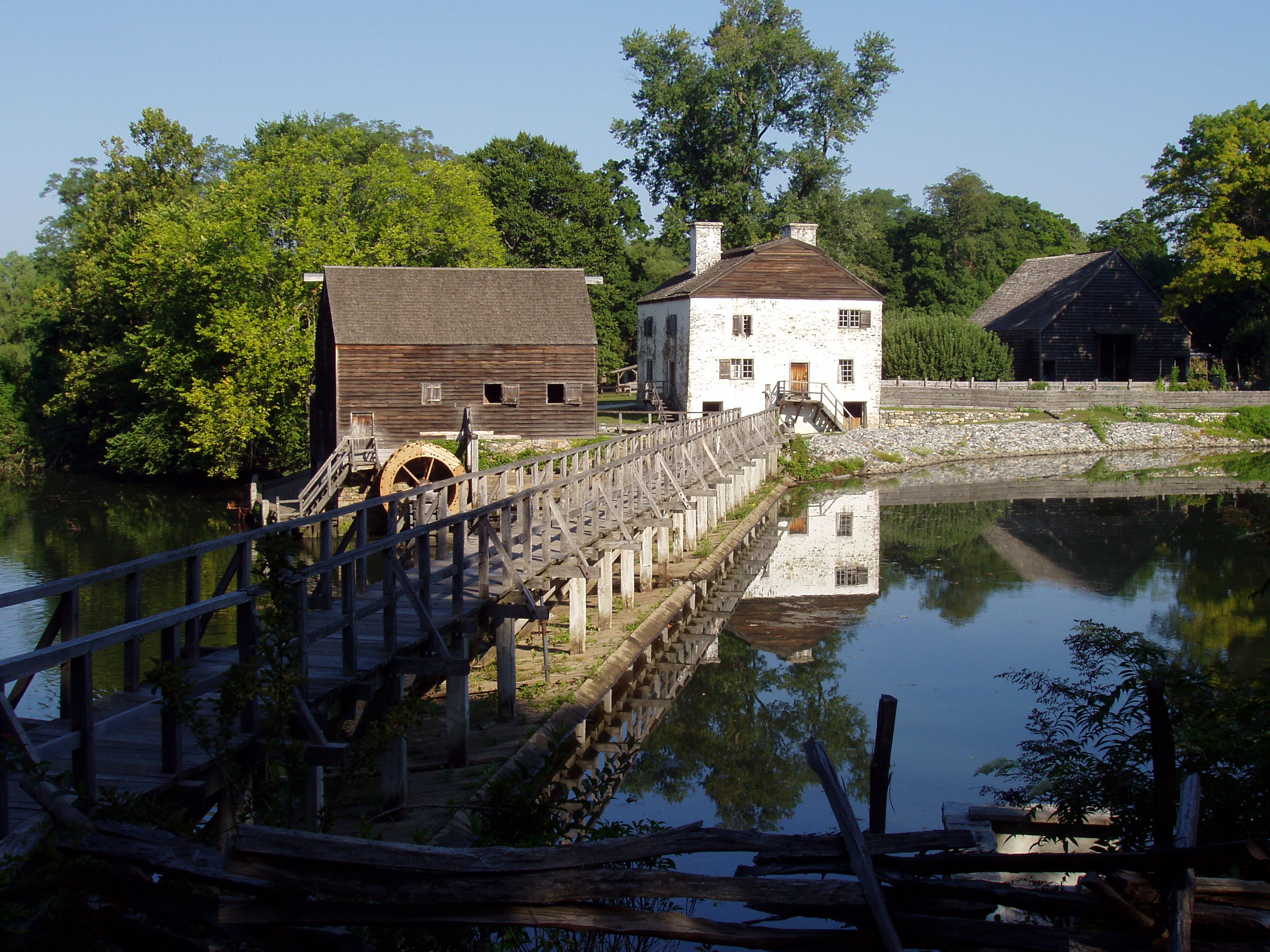
- The Upper Mills complex
- Interactive map showing the location of Phillipsburg Manor House
- Location: Sleepy Hollow, New York
- Nearest city: White Plains
- Coordinates: 41°05′18.7″N 73°51′49″W
- Built: 1693
- NRHP reference No.: 66000584
- NYSRHP No.: 11960.000094

Significant dates
- Added to NRHP: October 15, 1966
- Designated NHL: November 5, 1961
- Designated NYSRHP: June 23, 1980

Philipsburg Manor House is a historic site in the Upper Mills section of the former sprawling Colonial-era estate known as Philipsburg Manor. Together with a water mill and trading site, the house is operated as a non-profit museum by Historic Hudson Valley. It is located on US Route 9 in the village of Sleepy Hollow, New York.

Although Philipsburg Manor was established by a royal charter granted by King William III of England, it is listed by some sources with the patroonships of New Netherland, since it incorporated part of a patroonship previously owned by the colonial Dutch landowner Jonkheer Adriaen van der Donck.

The Baltus Van Tassel farmhouse, home of Katrina Van Tassel in Washington Irving's famous story, The Legend of Sleepy Hollow, may have been based on Philipsburg Manor House.

== History ==
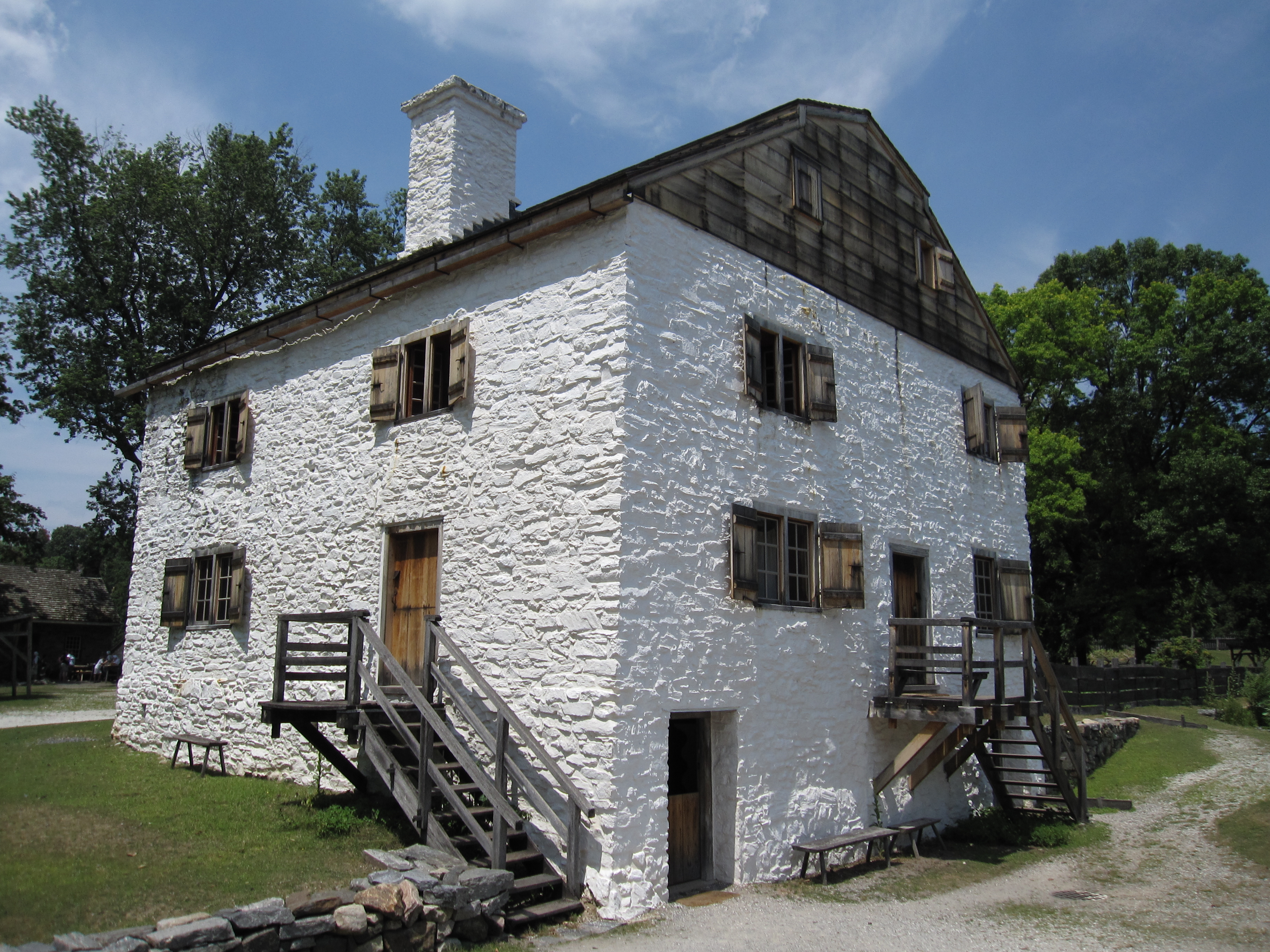
The main house

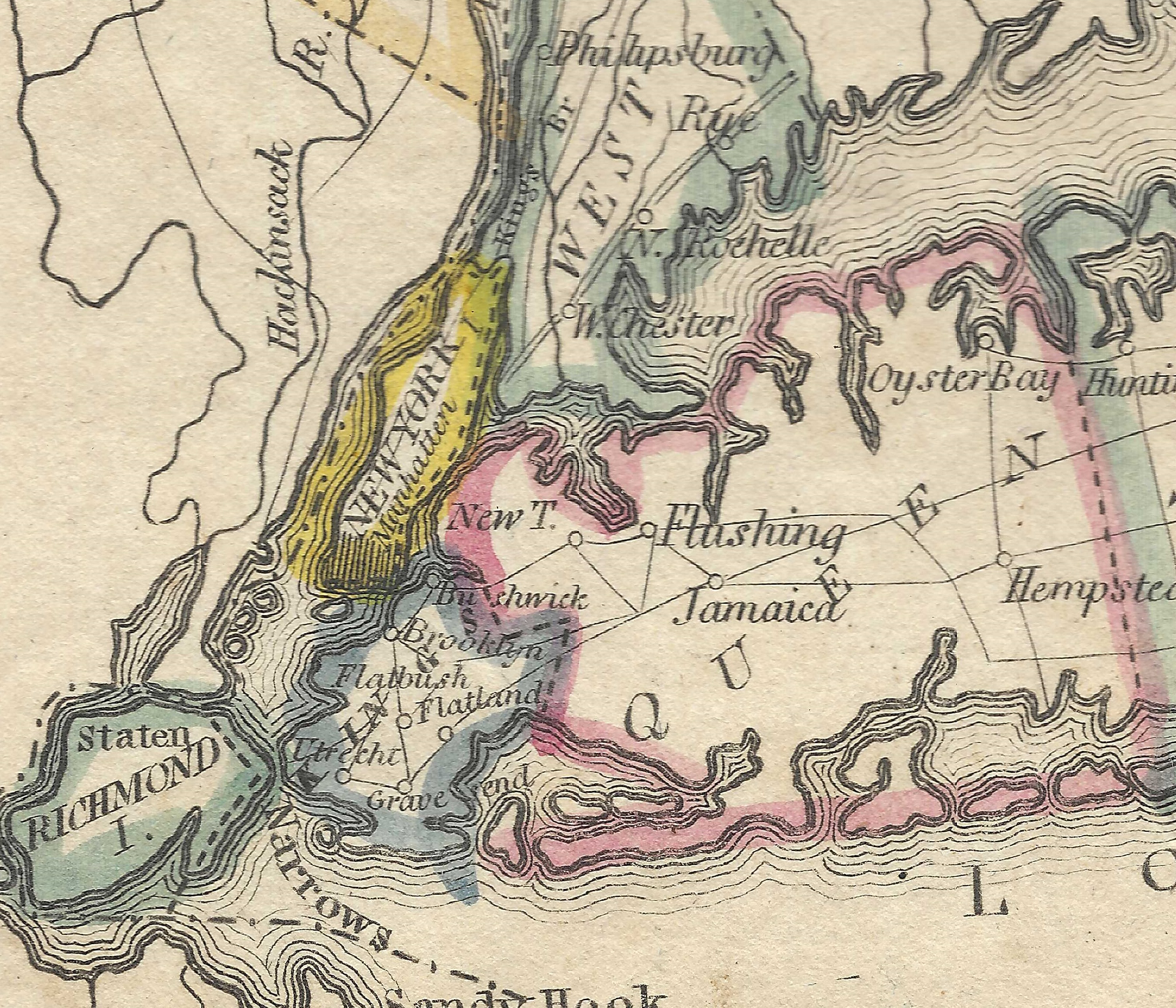
The Upper Mills section of Phillipsburg Manor appears on this 1814 map as Philipsburg.

Philipsburg Manor dates from 1693, when wealthy Province of New York merchant Frederick Philipse was granted a royal charter (making him lord of the manor) for 52,000 acres (21,000 ha) along the Hudson River by the English Crown. For more than thirty years, Frederick and his first wife Margaret (who was a prominent merchant in her own right), and later their son Adolphus, shipped hundreds of enslaved African men, women, and children across the Atlantic. By the mid-18th century, the Philipse family had one of the largest slave-holdings in the colonial North.

Philipse built a facility with a stone manor house, a mill, and a wharf at the confluence of the Pocantico and Hudson Rivers (this part of the manor became referred to as the Upper Mills) as a provisioning depot for the family's Atlantic sea trade and as headquarters for a worldwide shipping operation. The stone house, which would later become known as Philipsburg Manor House, was a two-story building with a basement and two rooms on each floor, divided by a large central chimney; there was a fireplace in each room. It was initially known as Castle Philipse, "for it was strongly fortified as a protection against the Indians."

The lands of the Upper Mills section of the manor were tenanted by farmers of various European backgrounds. The provisioning depot, anchored by the main house, was transformed into a major commercial operation by Frederick's son, Adolphus Philipse. He doubled the size of the house and managed the Upper Mills for nearly 50 years. The complex then included a stone gristmill, a bakehouse, workshops for blacksmiths, carpenters, and coopers, and a wharf for exporting grain and cornmeal internationally and for importing foreign goods. It was surrounded by orchards, stands of timber, stone quarries, and fields of grain (mostly wheat, as it was by far the most valuable crop grown in colonial New York).

The complex was largely operated by enslaved Africans. Slave quarters were installed by Adolphus about 90 feet from the main house. By the time of his death, twenty-three enslaved men, women, and children lived and worked at the manor. They are catalogued by name (and children, also with ages) in the 1750 probate inventory of his properties. As the most valuable "chattel" (personal property), they are listed first – before cattle, furniture, and tools.

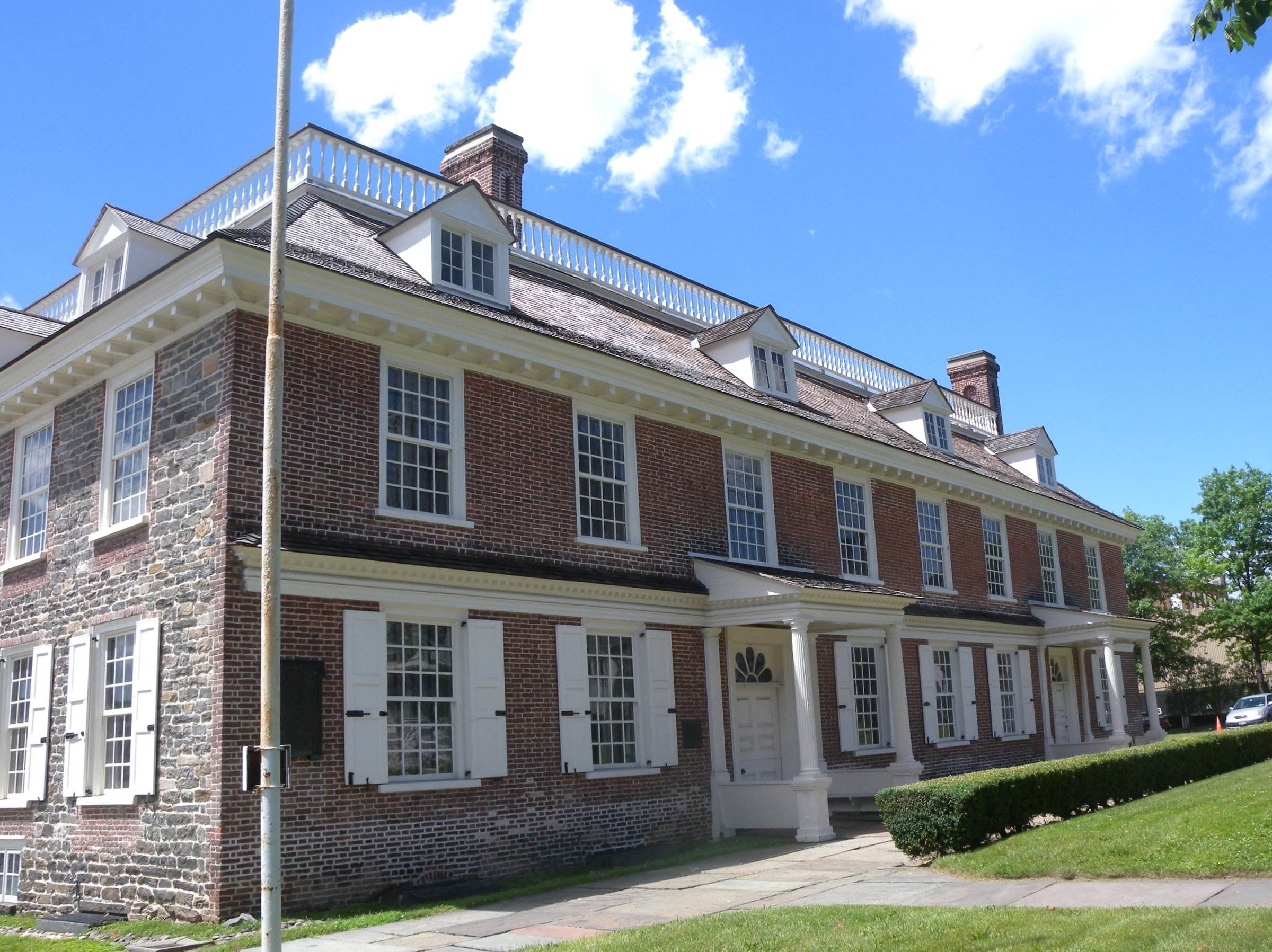
Philipse Manor Hall at the Lower Mills, in modern-day Yonkers

Frederick Philipse III, who inherited the Upper Mills after Adolphus's death, had no interest in running its operations. He did not live in the Upper Mills house, focusing on enlarging and upgrading Philipse Manor Hall, located closer to New York City at the Lower Mills segment of the manor, in what is now Yonkers. He leased the Upper Mills, including the house, to prominent Westchester landowning families; the leaseholders lived in the house. At the outbreak of the American Revolutionary War, the Philipses supported the British, and all their landholdings were seized and auctioned off. The Upper Mills land (about 750 acres (300 ha), including the house and outbuildings) was purchased in 1785 by Gerard G. Beekman Jr., a wealthy New York merchant and Revolutionary War veteran. In 1786, the state of New York passed a law emancipating all enslaved people whose masters' property had been confiscated; the law predated all other emancipation-related landmark events in the United States.

By the end of the 18th century, the gristmill was no longer in use. The Hudson River Railroad, built in the 1840s, severed the Upper Mills wharf from its historic ship landings and made it obsolete.

== Historic site ==
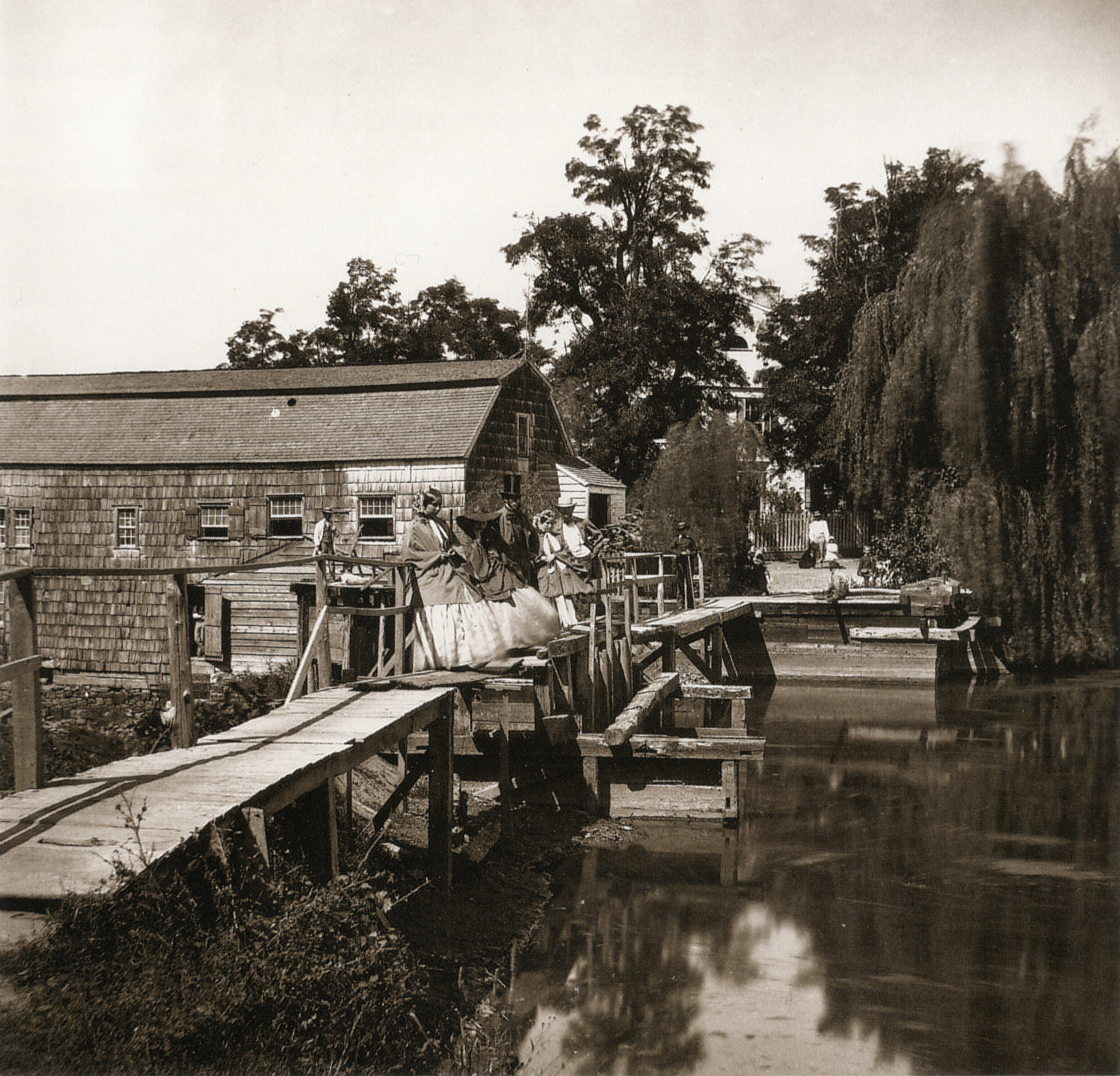
William England's 1859 stereoview of the mill and millpond at Philipsburg Manor House in what was then Beekman Town (now Sleepy Hollow)

The Beekman family, who lived in the house for several generations, enlarged it by adding a wing. In 1860, Beekman's descendants sold the property to Capt. Jacob Storm, a prominent local landowner and a descendant of Frederick Philipse's friend Dirck Storm. Later, it became part of the Ambrose Kingsland estate. Broadway star Elsie Janis, who bought the house around 1916, made significant alterations to the house. In 1936, she decided to sell it, stipulating that she would not sell it to anyone "except to a society or association that would maintain it as a historic museum." At the same time, the Historical Society of the Tarrytowns was leading efforts to save what was left of the original house and other structures. This prompted John D. Rockefeller Jr. to purchase the site and fund its preservation and restoration. The project was co-funded by another prominent local philanthropist, Helen Blakemoor Warner.

Historic site timeline:

- 1940: John D. Rockefeller Jr. purchased the property to preserve it. The initial restoration project was called "Philipse Castle Restoration" (using the initial name of the house).
- 1943: The site first opened to the public as a historic site under the name Philipse Castle.
- 1951: The property was acquired by Sleepy Hollow Restorations (now known as Historic Hudson Valley) to begin more extensive renovations.
- 1957: The name was officially changed to "Philipsburg Manor, Upper Millis," to better reflect the property's historical role as the industrial center of the Philipse family estate.
- 1959–1969: Closed for a major restoration to return the site to its 1750 appearance.
- November 5, 1961: Designated as a National Historic Landmark.
- October 15, 1966: Added to the National Register of Historic Places.
- 1969: Reopened in its present form as a living-history museum.

Excavations at the site conducted in the 1940s and 1950s uncovered foundations and structural remains of the manor house, gristmill, wharf, outbuildings, and dam, as well as thousands of artifacts reflecting the Philipse family's wealth and global trade connections, including delftware, glassware, and the earliest Chinese porcelain found in New York state. They are now part of the house museum's extensive collection. The gristmill was reconstructed between 1958 and 1960 to its current 18th-century appearance. During this restoration, the additions and alterations were removed from the manor house to return it to its colonial proportions.

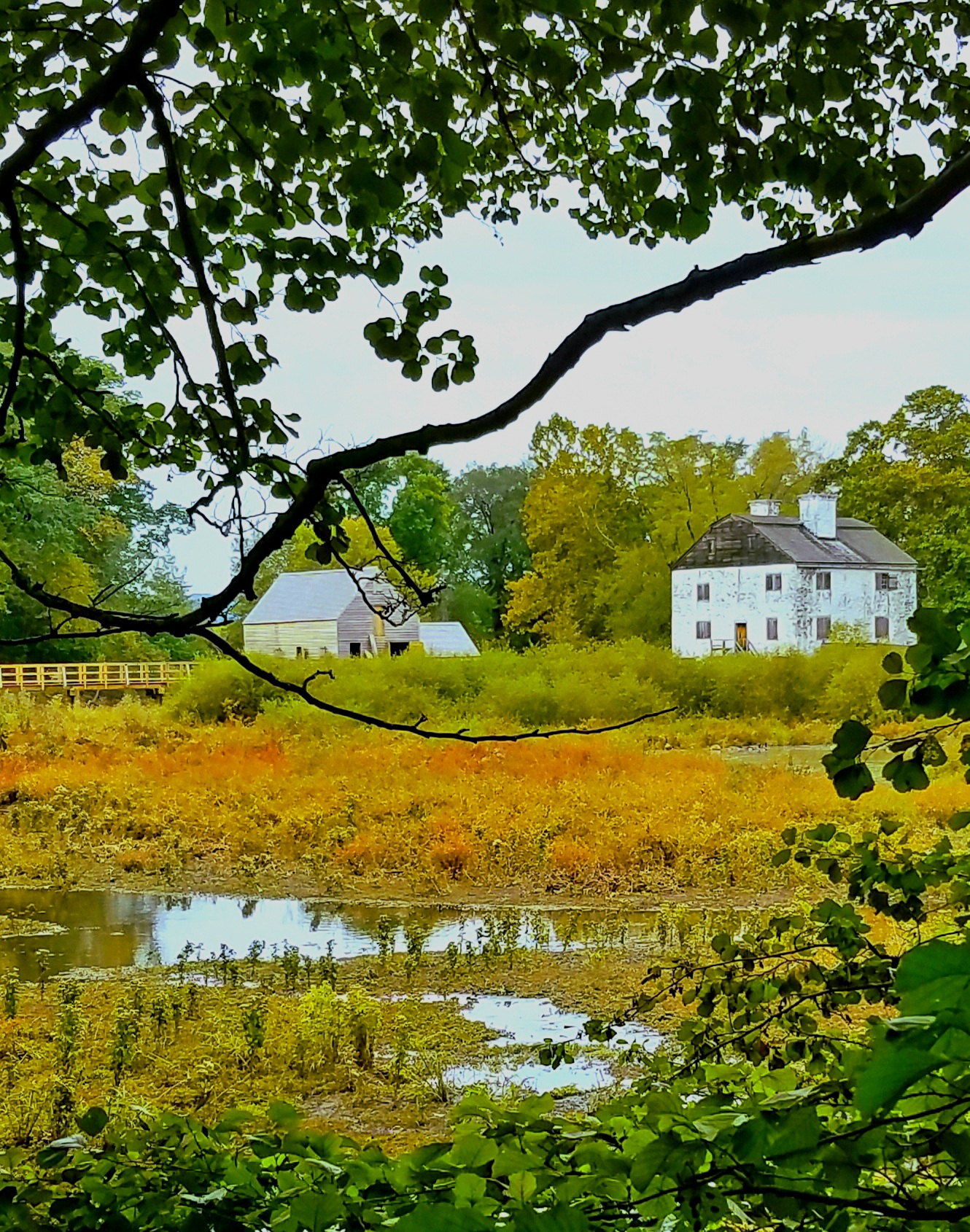
Philipsburg Manor House and the Pocantico River floodplain in the central part of today's Sleepy Hollow

Today, the site features a stone house, restored to its mid-18th-century appearance, filled with a collection of 17th- and 18th-century period furnishings, a working water-powered gristmill with a millpond, an 18th-century barn (moved from Hurley), a slave garden, a reconstructed wharf, and a reconstructed tenant farm house. (Note: Tenant farmers' houses were located on their small plots scattered across the massive estate. They paid their rent in part by the grain they produced and were bound to bring all their grain to the Upper Mills gristmill for grinding. (See: "The Meaning of the Rye Harvest at Philipsburg Manor". Historic Hudson Valley.)) A reconstructed tenant farmhouse was built on the Philipsburg Manor House site to help tell the story of the Upper Mills' extensive agricultural operation. The gristmill and the wharf were recreated using traditional tools and techniques from the 17th century. The long-vanished original furnishings of the house were replaced with appropriate antiques and exacting copies on the basis of the 1850 probate inventory of Adolphus Philipse's estate, which had a room-by-room description.

During the 1999 Hurricane Floyd, the Pocantico River was blocked by fallen trees and almost washed away the whole historic site. Some 70 employees of the parent organization, Historic Hudson Valley, assisted in its protection, along with the site's curators and security guards, and village residents.

In 2016, significant restoration work sponsored by the New York State Council on the Arts was completed on the gristmill to rebuild the entire wooden waterwheel and flume.

== Enslaved Africans' heritage ==
Intensive archival and material research since 2000 has made it possible to assemble valuable information on the lives of enslaved men, women, and children of the Upper Mills. This shifted the site's interpretative focus from manorial families to the enslaved community, leading to the creation of exhibits detailing the lives and work of individuals such as Caesar, the master miller, and Dina, the dairymaid. It is the only historic site in New York with a major focus on the living-history aspect of 18th-century slavery.

Since 2004, the site has been a tour stop on the African American Heritage Trail of Westchester County. Subsequently, Philipse Manor Hall and the Enslaved Africans' Raingarden in Yonkers also became tour stops on the Trail. The Raingarden features five life-sized bronze sculptures by the prominent Yonkers artist Vinnie Bagwell commemorating victims of the slave trade who lived at Philipse Manor Hall and were among the first to be legally manumitted in the U.S.

== See also ==
- List of National Historic Landmarks in New York
- National Register of Historic Places listings in northern Westchester County, New York
