= Jacobus Van Cortlandt =

American merchant and politician (1658–1739)

Jacobus van Cortlandt

31st and 34th Mayor of New York City
- In office 1719–1720
- Preceded by: John Johnstone
- Succeeded by: Robert Walters
- In office 1710–1711
- Preceded by: Ebenezer Wilson
- Succeeded by: Caleb Heathcote

Personal details
- Born: 1658 New Amsterdam, New Netherland
- Died: 1739 (aged 80–81) Bergen, Province of New Jersey, British America
- Resting place: Woodlawn Cemetery
- Spouse: Eva de Vries (before 1739)
- Relations: See Van Cortlandt family

Jacobus van Cortlandt (1658–1739) was a wealthy New Amsterdam-born American merchant and politician who served as the 31st and 34th Mayor of New York City from 1710 to 1711 and again from 1719 to 1720.

== Early life ==
Jacobus Van Cortlandt was born in 1658 in New Amsterdam, a 17th-century Dutch settlement established at the southern tip of Manhattan Island in what was then New Netherland. He was the son of Flemish-born Annetje (née Loockermans) Van Cortlandt (b. 1618) and Dutch born Captain Olof Stevense van Cortlandt (d. 1684), who arrived in New Amsterdam in 1637. His father was originally a soldier and bookkeeper that rose to high colonial ranks through his work with the Dutch West India Company, eventually serving many terms as burgomaster and alderman. Reportedly, his mother, known as "Anna", began the "Santa Claus" tradition in America.

Jacobus was the second of four children born to his parents. his siblings included Stephanus van Cortlandt, who married Geertruy van Schuyler; Maria van Cortlandt, who married Jeremias van Rensselaer; and Catherine van Cortlandt, who first married Johannes Derval and after his death, married Frederick Philipse, the 1st Lord of Philipsborough Manor (later, the common spelling would change to "Philipsburg"). Philipse was previously married to Margaret Hardenbroeck and during that marriage, had adopted her daughter, Eva de Vries, who changed her last name to Philipse and eventually became Jacobus' wife.

== Career ==
Van Cortlandt, who became a wealthy merchant, purchased a parcel of land in what is now Van Cortlandt Park in the Bronx, from John Barrett after the death of John's father, Samuel Barrett, around 1691. At that time, the plantation was considered Yonkers.

From 1710 to 1711 and again from 1719 to 1720, Van Cortlandt served as the 31st and 34th Mayor of New York City.

== Personal life ==
Coat of arms of Jacobus Van Cortlandt

Van Cortlandt was married to Eva de Vries (born 1660-year of death unknown), the daughter of Margaret Hardenbroeck and Peter Rudolphus de Vries, and the adopted daughter of Frederick Philipse, the 1st Lord of the Philipsburg Manor. Together, Jacobus and Eva were the parents of:

- Frederick Van Cortlandt (1699–1749), who married Francina Jay, daughter of Auguste Jay and Anne Marika Bayard. Frederick built the Van Cortlandt House in 1748.
- Mary Van Cortlandt, who in 1728 married Peter Jay (b. 1704), the brother of Francina Jay.
- Augustus Van Cortlandt, the last Clerk of the City and County of New York under British rule.
- Margaret Van Cortlandt, who married Abraham de Peyster, a son of mayor Abraham de Peyster.

Van Cortlandt died in 1739 in Bergen, New Jersey.

=== Descendants ===
Through his son Frederick, he was the grandfather of Augustus Van Cortlandt (1728–1823), who married Elsie Cuyler, daughter of Albany mayor Cornelis Cuyler in 1760. After her death in 1761, he married Catherine Barclay, daughter of Andrew Barclay and Helena (née Roosevelt) Barclay.

Through his daughter Mary, he was the grandfather of Dr. James Jay (1732–1815), a noted physician, and John Jay (1745–1829), a Founding Father of the United States and first Chief Justice of the Supreme Court. Through his grandson Dr. James Jay, Van Cortlandt is the 3x great-grandfather of the 19th century strategist Alfred Thayer Mahan (1840–1914).
