= Adolphus Philipse =

Landowner

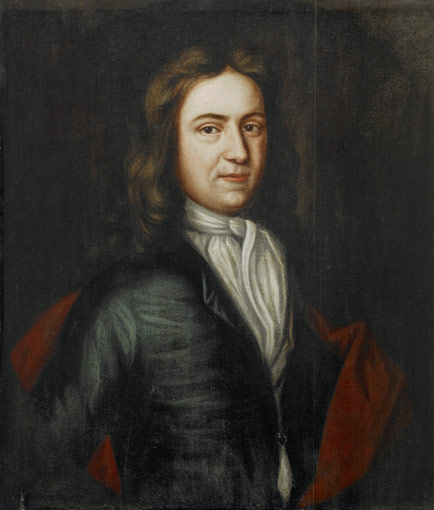
Adolphus Philipse (1665–1749), son of Frederick Philipse, first Lord of the Manor of Philipsborough

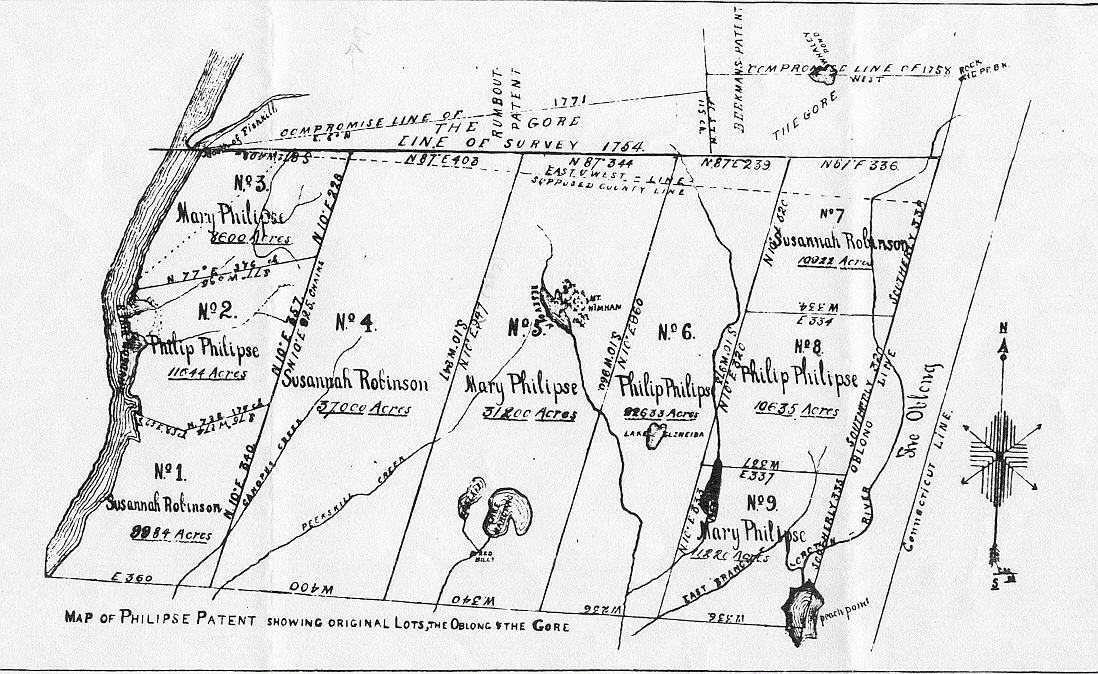
Map of Philipse Patent (showing the Oblong and Gore)

Adolphus Philipse (1665–1750) was a wealthy landowner of Dutch descent in the Province of New York. He owned part of the original Manor of Philipsborough (later, the common spelling would change to "Philipsburg") in Westchester County. In 1697, he purchased an extensive tract of land along the east bank of the Hudson River stretching all the way to the Connecticut border. Then known as the "Highland Patent," it would later be referred to as the Philipse Patent. After his death, the Patent was inherited by his nephew, Frederick Philipse II, his only heir-at-law, who became the second lord of Philipsburg Manor. He held important positions in the government of the Province of New York, serving as a member of the Governor' Council and as Speaker of the General Assembly.

== Early life ==
Adolphus Philipse was born in 1665 in New York City (just renamed from New Amsterdam), the second son of Frederick Philipse, the first lord of the Manor of Philipsborough (Philipsburg), a Dutch immigrant to North America of Bohemian heritage who had risen to become one of the greatest landholders in the New Netherlands. his childhood was centered around the family's activities in the growing colonial port. His father's primary residence and business operations, including international trade and his role in the Governor's Council, were based in Manhattan.

== Career ==
In 1697, Philipse purchased a tract of land that ran along the northern Westchester County border, which received Royal sanction as the "Highland Patent", later known as the Philipse Patent. Spanning from the Hudson River to the then Connecticut Colony it encompassed some 250 square miles.

Upon Frederick's death in 1702, Adolphus received all of the manor lands north of Dobb's Ferry, including the present town; this part of the manor was known as the Upper Mills. He was also named proprietor of a tract of land on the west bank of the Hudson north of Anthony's Nose and executor of Philip's estate. The balance of the manor and family commercial holdings, as well as the title of the Lord of the manor, were bequeathed to Adolphus's nephew, Frederick Philipse II, son of his elder brother Philip, who had been heir to the title but died in 1699.

Adolphus owned and managed the Upper Mills for nearly 50 years, transforming it into a major commercial operation. It included a stone gristmill, a bakehouse, and a wharf for exporting grain and dairy products internationally via New York City. The complex was anchored by the Philipsburg Manor House and operated by enslaved Africans. Slave quarters were installed by him about 90 feet from the main house. By the time of his death, twenty-three enslaved men, women, and children lived and worked at the manor. They are listed with names (and children, also with ages) in the 1850 probate inventory of his properties.

After the bachelor Adolphus' death in 1749, his Manor holdings and the Highland Patent passed to Frederick II, his only heir-at-law, who became the second lord of Philipsburg Manor.

During the American Revolution, all the Philipses' lands were confiscated by the Provisional New York government's Commissioners of Forfeiture and sold at a public auction.

== Philipse Patent ==
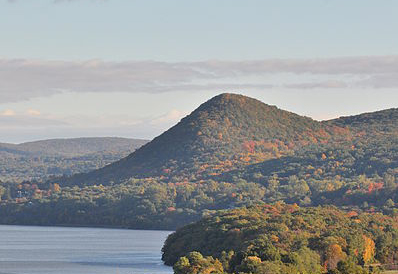
The Hudson Highlands are among the scenic highlilghts of the Philipse Patent

In 1697, Philipse purchased a tract of land from Dutch traders Lambert Dortlandt and Jan Sybrandt, who had bought it a few years before from several Wiccopee chiefs. This became known as the Highland Patent and extended approximately 13 miles along the east shore of the Hudson River, from Annsville Creek to the Fish Kill, and eastward some 20 or so miles to the border of the Colony of Connecticut, including Pollopel Island in the Hudson.

Shortly after purchasing it, Philipse (whose main country residence was in Lower Manhattan and who maintained only a bachelor shooting lodge on Lake Mahopac in the Highland Patent), opened the tract to tenant settlers. Thus began a policy that lasted throughout his lifetime and his heirs' so long as they owned the land, to rent rather than sell, a practice which led to stunted growth for two and a half centuries to come.

After Philipse's death in 1750 (Smith, 1749), the Highland Patent was inherited by his nephew, Frederick Philipse II, his only heir-at-law, who became the second lord of Philipsburg Manor in Westchester County. During the American Revolution, the Philipse Patent lands were confiscated by the Provisional New York government's Commissioners of Forfeiture. Sold afterwards, they became today's Putnam County and parts of Dutchess County.

== Personal life ==
Adolphus Philipse was the second son of Frederick Philipse, the first lord of Philipsburg Manor, and his first wife, Margaret Hardenbroeck. (For Margaret, it was the second marriage.) He was the younger brother of Philip Philipse.

He primarily lived and managed his business affairs from an office and home on New Street in the Financial District of Lower Manhattan, while often staying in Philipse Manor House at the Upper Mills and visiting his hunting lodge at the Highland Patent. He never married and died intestate on January 20, 1749 (1750 New Style).

== See also ==
- Philipse Patent
- Frederick Philipse
- Frederick Philipse II
- Philipsburg Manor House
- Dutchess County Land Patents
- The Oblong
