= Frederick Philipse II =

American merchant, landowner, and politician

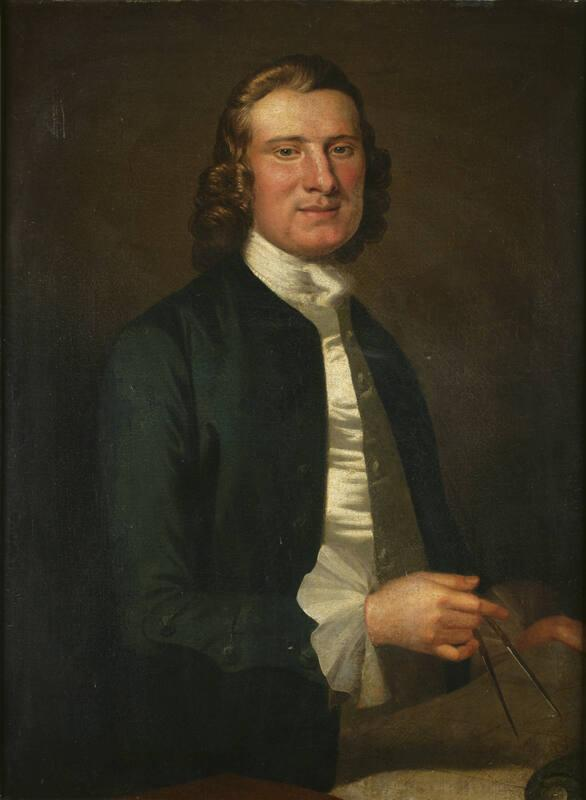
- c. 1750 portrait of Philipse by John Wollaston

2nd Lord of Philipsburg Manor
- In office 1749–1751
- Preceded by: Adolphus Philipse (Acting)
- Succeeded by: Frederick Philipse III

Personal details
- Born: c. 1698 Barbados
- Died: July 26, 1751 Province of New York, British America
- Spouse: Johanna Brockholst (m. 1726)
- Children: 10, including Frederick III
- Parent(s): Philip Philipse; Maria Sparkes Philipse
- Relatives: Frederick Philipse (grandfather); Adolphus Philipse (uncle)
- Occupation: Landowner, merchant

Frederick Philipse II (c. 1698 – July 26, 1751) was an American merchant, landowner, and politician. He was the only son of Maria Sparkes, daughter of the Governor of Barbados, and Philip Philipse, eldest son of Frederick Philipse I, first lord of Philipsburg Manor. Philip predeceased his father, and family lands passed on to younger son Adolphus Philipse. Upon his uncle's death Frederick II inherited his share of Philipse lands and commercial interests, thereafter becoming the elder Philipse male and second lord of Philipsburg Manor.

He also inherited the Highland Patent (later called the "Philipse Patent"), a 250 mi^{2} (650 km^{2}) parcel of land on the east bank of the Hudson River spanning the northern Westchester County line clear to the Connecticut border.

Frederick II represented Westchester in the New York Assembly from 1724 to 1751. Upon his death in 1751 his eldest son, Frederick III, became the 3rd and final Lord of Philipsburg Manor.

== Early life ==
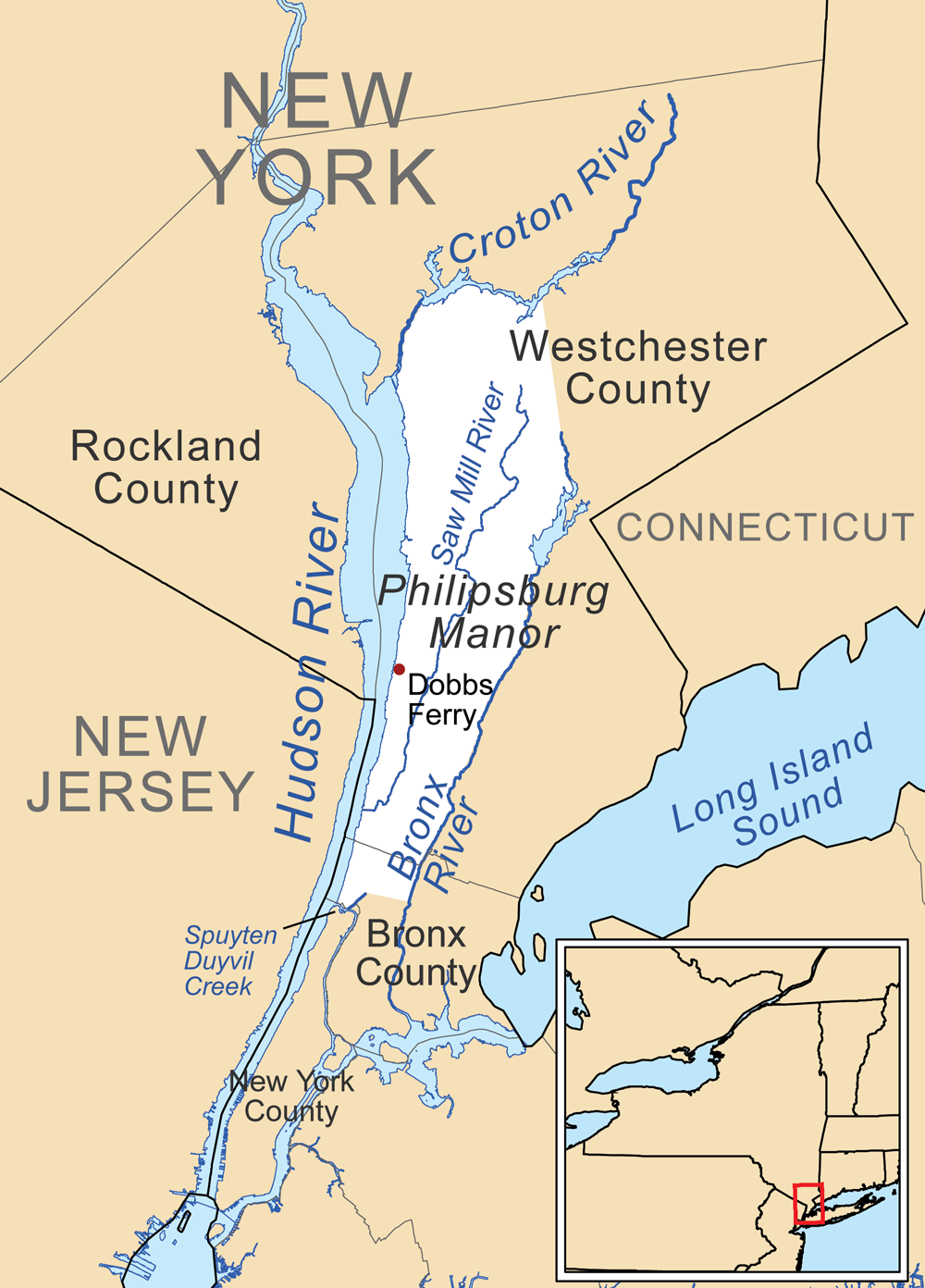
Map of Philipsburg Manor with current borders overlaid on the property

Philipse' was born at Spring Head, the estate of his father in Barbados, c. 1698. He was the only son of his parents, Philip Philipse (1663–1699), and Maria (née Sparkes) Philipse, who both died in Barbados shortly after his birth in 1698 (on September 14 and October 18, respectively). (Note: Conflicting dates are given for death of his father Philip Philipse: 1700, and 1689, both accounts indicating his wife died at the same time. Their death notices, signed by the rector of nearby St. James Church, list cause of death as "belly ake", aka dysentery, a frequent cause of death during that time period on the island.) Following their deaths, young Frederick went to New York to live with his grandfather, who immediately sold the Barbados estate to ensure that young Frederick would not be induced later to settle there, which reportedly greatly upset his mother's relatives.

His mother was the youngest of the four daughters of Joyce (née Farmer) Sparkes and Sparkes, Esq., who was reportedly a governor of Barbados. (Note: His is often referred to as the Governor of Barbados, however, it is more likely that he was a senior government official under Sir Jonathan Atkins, or John Farmer, the acting Governor of Barbados from 1701–1703.) Two of his maternal aunts had returned to their father's estate in Worcestershire, England, and the others accompanied their parents to the Barbados. When his paternal grandfather died on November 6, 1702, Frederick was thereafter raised by his grandfather's second wife, Catharine (née Van Cortlandt) Philipse, the daughter of New York mayor Stephanus Van Cortlandt, who took him to England to be educated. His grandmother and the elder Frederick's first wife was Margaret Hardenbroeck Philipse, who predeceased his grandfather. While in England, young Philipse studied law, and upon reaching his majority, inherited a large part of the Philipse estate and became the 2nd Lord of Philipsburg.

Upon the death of his bachelor uncle Adolphus Philipse, Frederick II inherited Adolphus' share of Philipse lands and commercial interests received from Frederick I, as well as the upper Highland Patent (later known as the Philipse Patent) that Adolphus had been granted by the Crown for lands purchased north of Westchester County between the Hudson River and the Connecticut Colony.

== Career ==
Philipse II served as a Justice of the Peace, an Alderman and was repeatedly elected as Representative for the County of Westchester in the New York Assembly for the last twenty-seven years of his life until 1751. In the assembly, he served alongside Robert Livingston, the 3rd Lord of Livingston Manor, who represented Livingston Manor from 1737 to 1790.

He was appointed Third Justice of the Supreme Court of Judicature in 1731. He took office as Second Justice in 1733, a position that he held until his death in 1751.

On April 6, 1733, Philipse II, as a committee member, helped to lay out the original Bowling Green in lower Manhattan. Later that year, he became one of the lessee's in charge of Bowling Green at the cost of one peppercorn per year.

Justice Philipse was a member of the majority that found in favor of Governor William Cosby in Cosby v. Van Dam, the 1733 case that precipitated the political crises that led to the Zenger trial. As Second Justice, Philipse participated in the New York Slave Conspiracy trials of 1741 which, based upon questionable testimony, resulted in death sentences for thirty-four defendants and the deportation of ninety-one others away from the colony.

== Personal life ==
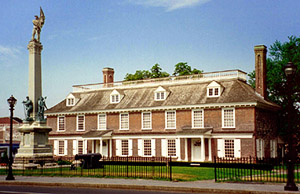
Philipse Manor Hall, the Lower Mills manor house

In 1726, Philipse was married to Johanna Brockholst (1700–1765), youngest daughter of Anthony Brockholst, Esq., the 4th Governor of New York after it became part of Great Britain, and Susanna Maria, the daughter of Paulus Aemilius Schrect, of the Pompton Estate, in New Jersey, who had emigrated from West Friesland in Holland. Together, they were the parents of ten children, nine of their ten children were baptized in the Dutch Church in New York. (Note: Their daughter Mary's baptism does not appear here, if the published date of her birth, July 5, 1730, is correct.)

=== Offspring ===
- Frederick Philipse III (1720–1785), who married Elizabeth (née Williams) Rutgers in 1764.
- Susanna Philipse (b. 1723), who died young.
- Philip Philipse (1724–1768)
- Maria Philipse (1726–1726), who died in infancy.
- Susanna Philipse (1727–1822), who married Col. Beverley Robinson (1721–1792), commander of the Loyal American Regiment, a regiment during the Revolution.
- Mary Philipse (1730–1825), nicknamed Charming Polly, who married Col. Roger Morris (1727–1794) in 1758.
- Margaret Philipse (b. 1733–1752)
- Anthony Philipse (b. 1735), who died young.
- Joanna Philipse (b. 1739), who died young.
- Adolphus Philipse (b. 1742), who died young.

Philipse died of consumption in New York on July 26, 1751; and was buried in the family vault in the Dutch Church at Sleepy Hollow, near Tarrytown. In his will, he left Philipsbourg and most of his houses in New York (that were bequeathed to him by his grandfather) to his son Frederick. If his son Frederick did not marry, his son Philip would inherit, and if neither of them married or had only daughters, then the properties were to go to his own daughters, Susanna Philipse Robinson, and Mary Philipse Morris. His widow was killed by a fall from her carriage on the Highland estate, in 1765.

== Legacy ==
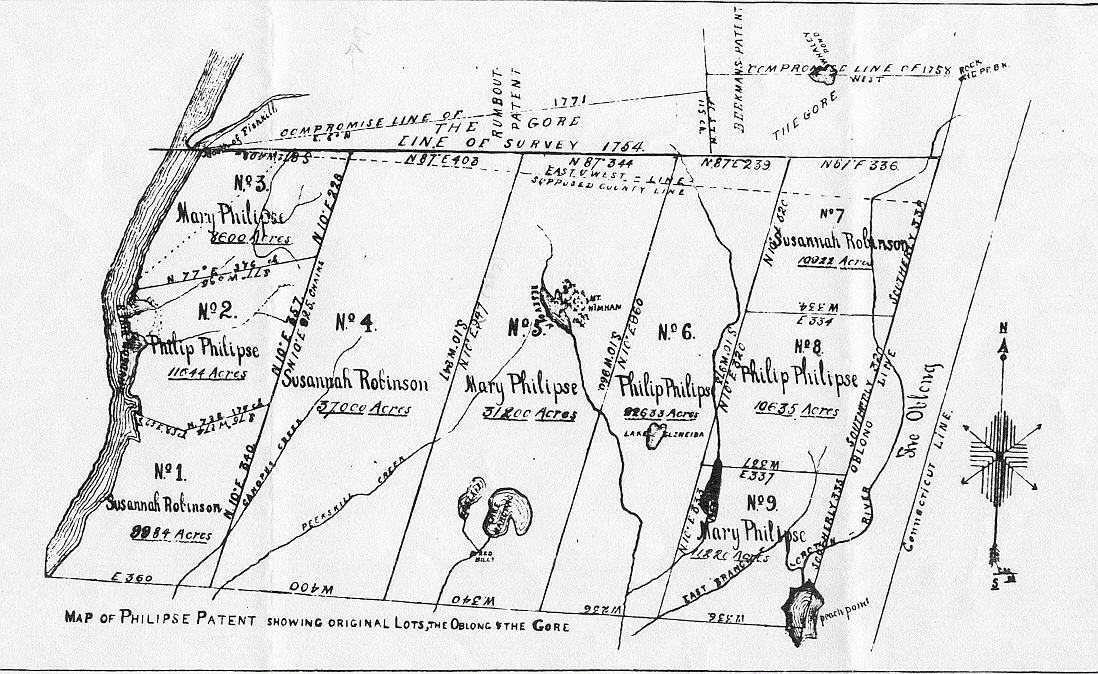
A map of Philipse Patent (showing the Oblong and Gore)

Upon his death Philipsburg Manor was bequeathed to his son, who became Frederick Philipse III, the 3rd Lord of Philipsburg Manor. The Highland Patent (Philipse Patent) was divided (in equal portions) among Frederick's other surviving offspring, Philip, Mary, and Susanna Philipse. Later known as the Philipse Patent, the roughly 250 square mile parcel became today's Putnam County, New York.

Philipse was the founder of St. John's Church in Yonkers.

== See also ==
- Philipse Patent
- Adolphus Philipse
- Frederick Philipse I
- Dutchess County Land Patents
- The Oblong
