= Philipse Manor Hall State Historic Site =

Historic house museum in Yonkers, New York

- Philipse Manor Hall
- U.S. National Register of Historic Places
- U.S. National Historic Landmark
- New York State Register of Historic Places
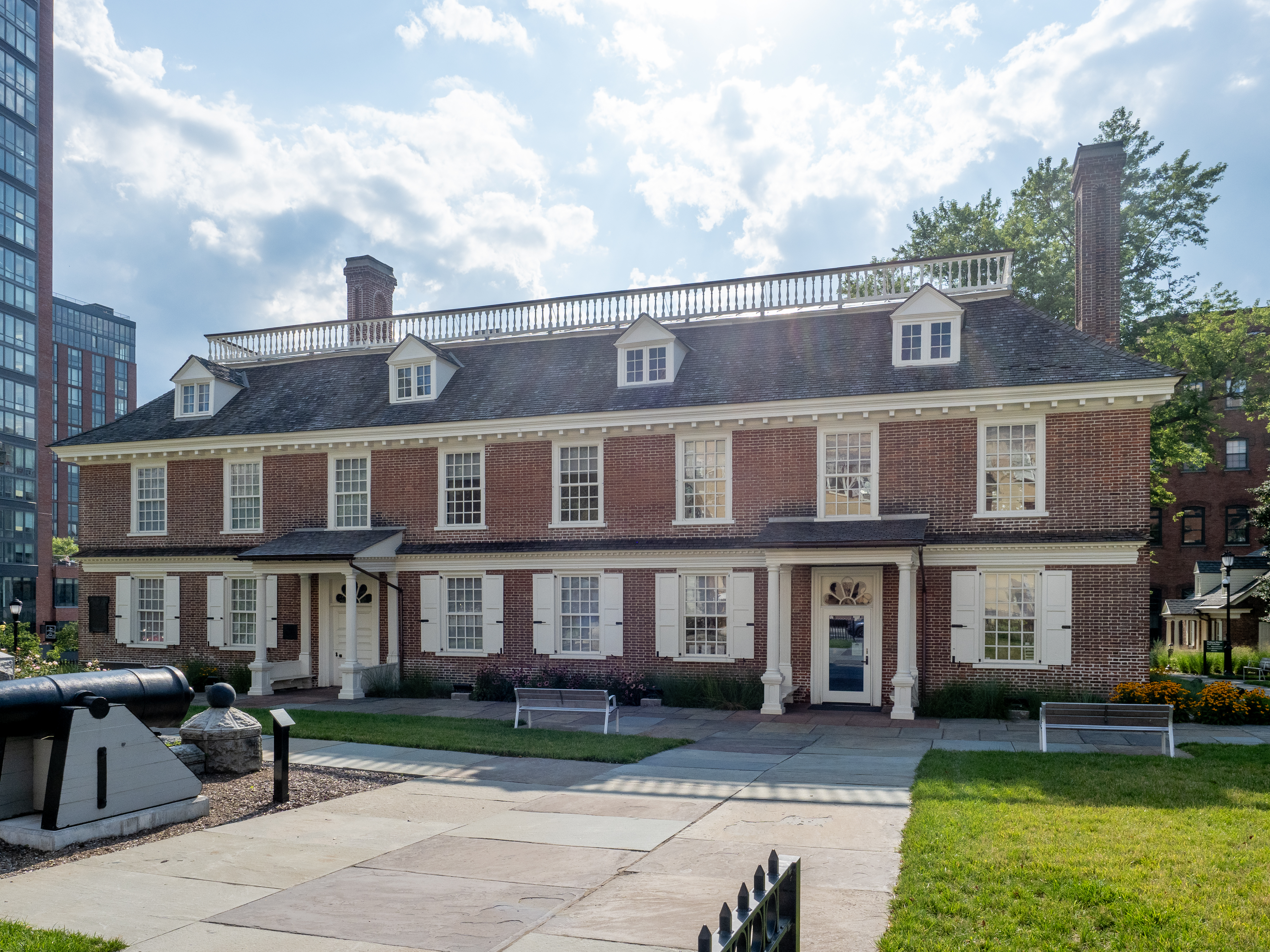
- The Manor house

- Location within New York
- Interactive map showing Phillipse Manor Hall's location
- Location: Yonkers, New York
- Coordinates: 40°56′08″N 73°53′59″W
- Built: c.1682
- Architect: Frederick Philipse
- NRHP reference No.: 66000585
- NYSRHP No.: 11940.000618

Significant dates
- Added to NRHP: October 15, 1966
- Designated NHL: November 5, 1961
- Designated NYSRHP: June 23, 1980

Philipse Manor Hall State Historic Site is a historic house museum located in the Getty Square neighborhood of Yonkers, New York. Originally the family seat of Philipsburg Manor, and later Yonkers city hall, it is Westchester County's second oldest standing building after the Timothy Knapp House. Located near the Hudson River at Warburton Avenue and Dock Street, it is owned and operated by the New York State Office of Parks, Recreation and Historic Preservation.

== History ==
The southwest corner, the oldest part of the structure, was built around 1682 by Dutch-born merchant and trader Frederick Philipse, the first lord of Philipsburg Manor, and his first wife Margaret Hardenbroeck who was a prominent merchant in her own right. Philipse, who by his second marriage became a son-in-law of Stephanus Van Cortlandt, had amassed by the time of his death a 52,000-acre (21,000 ha) estate along the Hudson River that encompassed the entire modern city of Yonkers and much of western and lower Westchester County. For more than thirty years, Frederick and Margaret, and later their son Adolphus, shipped hundreds of enslaved African men, women, and children across the Atlantic. By the mid-18th century, the Philipse family had one of the largest slave-holdings in the colonial North.

During Philipse's life, the building, one of his two manor houses, was used primarily as a stopover point on the long journey up and down the river between his home in New Amsterdam and the northern parts of his estate, where he had another house (which is now the Philipsburg Manor House historic site in Sleepy Hollow, New York). That is where the majority of the Philipses' slaves lived and worked. His grandson, Frederick Philipse II, the second lord of the manor, and his great-grandson, Frederick Philipse III, the last lord, successively enlarged and enhanced the former stopover building, making it the primary family residence, Philipse Manor Hall.

On November 28, 1776, nearly five months after the signing of the Declaration of Independence and the start of the American Revolution, Frederick Philipse III and over 200 of his contemporaries signed a document declaring their allegiance to the British Crown and their unwillingness to support the Revolutionary cause. The Philipse Manor Hall was used during the war, most notably by British General Sir Henry Clinton during military activities in 1779. It was there that he wrote what is now known as the Philipsburg Proclamation, which declared all Patriot-owned slaves to be free, and that blacks taken prisoner while serving in Patriot forces would be sold into slavery.

Because of his Loyalism, Philipse was branded a traitor and placed under arrest on orders signed by General George Washington. He was held in Connecticut for a time, but was given special permission to travel back to Philipse Manor Hall to settle his affairs on the condition that he was not to aid the British cause. In violation of his parole, he and his family fled to British-occupied New York City and later to Great Britain, leaving their estate and Philipse Manor Hall behind to be attainted in 1779.

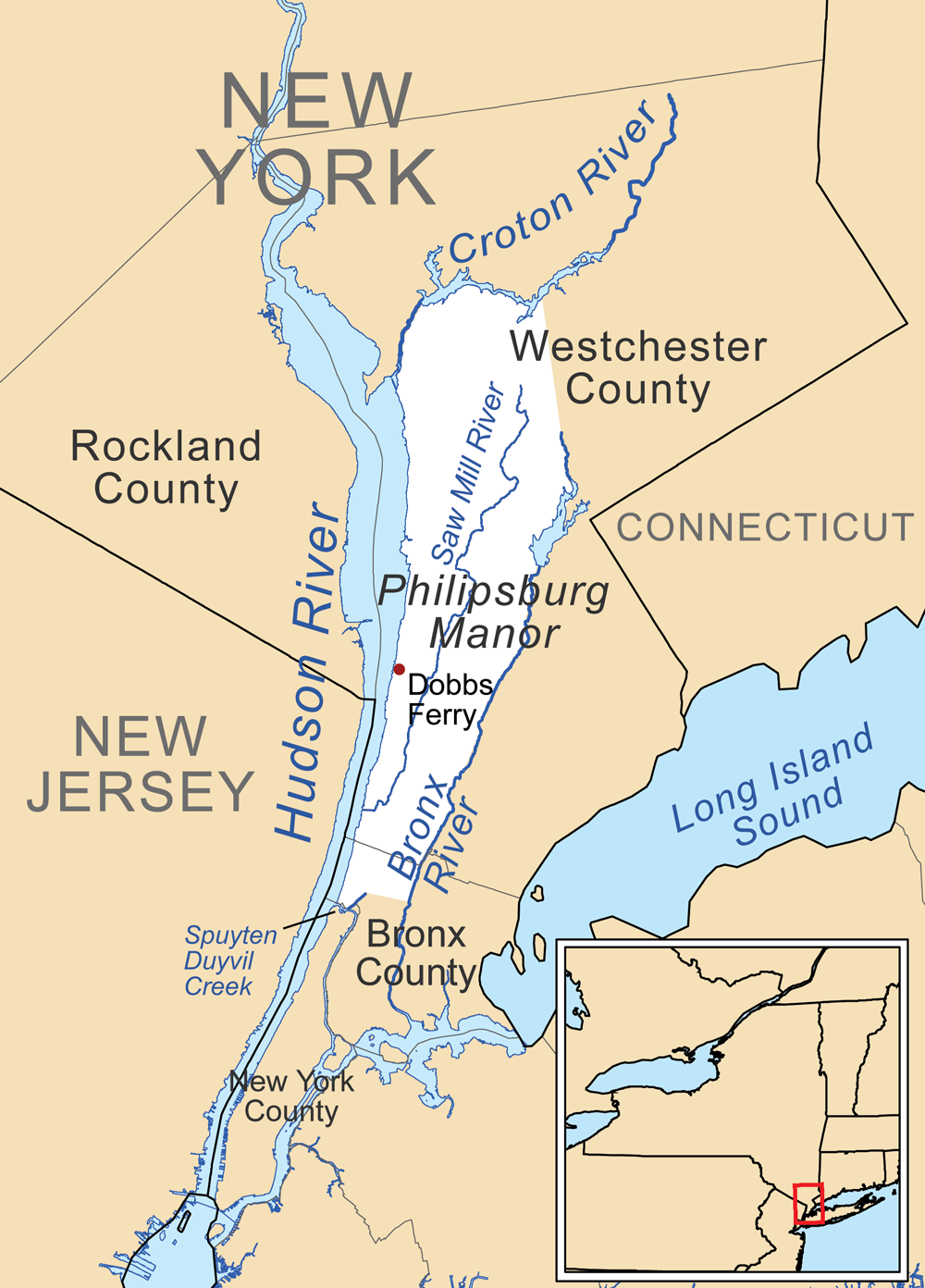
Map of Philipsburg Manor with current borders overlaid on the property

Philipse family holdings, which included the Philipse Patent, a 250 square mile tract that became today's Putnam and part of Dutchess counties, were sold at a public auction by New York's Commissioners of Forfeiture during the Revolution. In 1786, the state of New York passed a law emancipating all enslaved people whose masters' property had been confiscated; the law predated all other emancipation-related landmark events in the United States.

Philipse Manor Hall was occupied by various families throughout the 19th century. In 1868, the building became Yonkers' municipal center (as Village Hall, and later, as City Hall) and remained such until 1908. During this period, an elaborate monument to those Yonkers natives who had died during the American Civil War was installed on the east lawn. Called the Soldiers and Sailors Monument, it was erected in 1891.

By 1908, the growing complexity of city government had made the building nearly obsolete as a government center. Public meetings were held, and options such as adding wings onto the building and tearing it down outright were discussed. The question became moot when Eva Smith Cochran, matriarch of a wealthy local carpet milling family, stepped in and donated $50,000 to the city as a nominal reimbursement for their care of the building during the previous 40 years. This allowed the city to turn ownership of the building over to the State of New York. Between that time and the 1960s, the building was owned by the state but cared for by the American Scenic and Historic Preservation Society. Since the dissolution of the Society, the building is owned, maintained and curated by the New York State Office of Parks, Recreation and Historic Preservation.

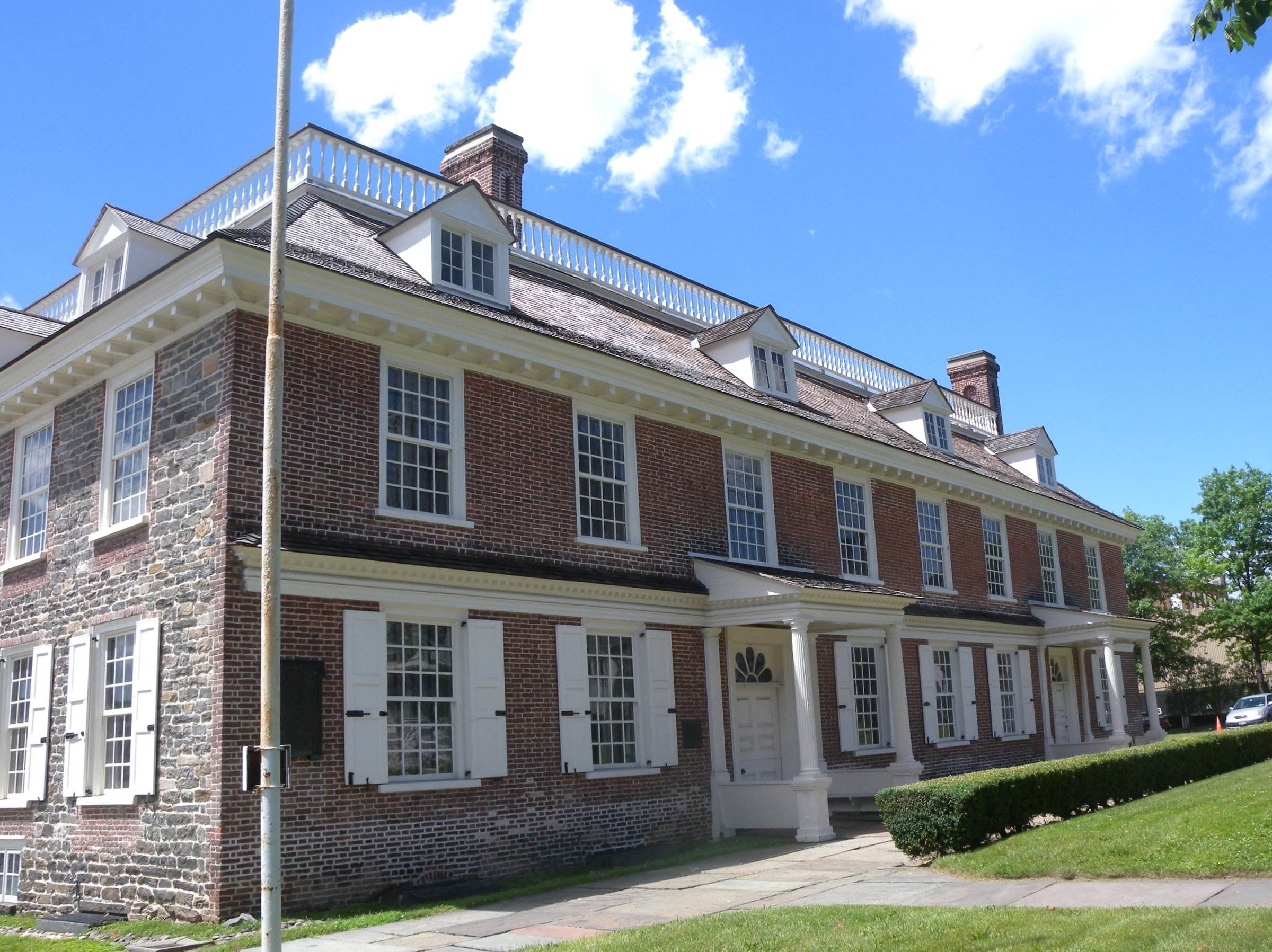
The house in 2011

From 1911 to 1912, the most intense restoration project in the building's history brought the house back to a semblance of its colonial appearance. The building has been open as a museum of history, art and architecture since 1912. The building was declared a National Historic Landmark in 1961.

== Enslaved Africans' heritage ==
Philipse Manor Hall and the Enslaved Africans' Raingarden in Yonkers are tour stops on the African American Heritage Trail of Westchester County. The Raingarden features five life-sized bronze sculptures by the prominent Yonkers artist Vinnie Bagwell commemorating victims of the slave trade who lived at Philipse Manor Hall and were among the first to be legally manumitted in the U.S.

== Collections ==
The house is home to a ca. 1750 papier-mâché and plaster Rococo ceiling, one of two in-situ ceilings of its type in the United States. The elaborate ceiling is covered in designs and motifs relevant to Frederick Philipse III's lifestyle. For example, his love of music is represented by lute players, bagpipers and singers; his enthusiasm for hunting is represented by hunting dogs and game birds; and his education in the arts and sciences is represented by busts of Alexander Pope and Sir Isaac Newton.

Also of architectural significance is the 1868 City Council Chamber, designed by John Davis Hatch. The Chamber's high, vaulted ceiling and woodwork are intentionally reminiscent of a typical English manor house's great hall.

Throughout the house are paintings from the Cochran Collection of American Portraiture. This collection was put together by agents of Alexander Smith Cochran (son of Eva Smith Cochran and owner of the family's carpet mills) and features works by Charles Willson Peale and John Trumbull. Represented among the 60 paintings are nearly all of the presidents of the United States from Washington to Calvin Coolidge, as well as war heroes, historical figures, and members of the Philipse family.

== See also ==
- Philipsburg Manor House
- List of National Historic Landmarks in New York
- List of the oldest buildings in New York
