= Philip Philipse =

Dutch-born merchant trader, slaver, land baron, and 1st Lord of Philipsburg Manor

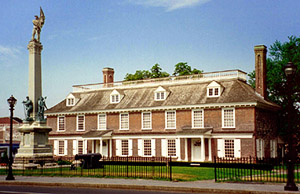
Philipse Manor Hall, the Lower Mills manor house

Philip Philipse (1663–1699) was the eldest son and heir of Frederick Philipse, a Dutch-born merchant trader, slaver, land baron, and 1st Lord of Philipsburg Manor. However, he died before his father.

== Early life ==
Philip Philipse was the eldest son of Frederick Philipse (1626–1702), Lord of Philipsburg Manor and Margaret Hardenbroeck (c.1637–c.1690).

== Personal life ==
Philipse married Maria, daughter of John Sparke(s) of Devon, England, and Barbados, said but not proven to be the Governor of Barbados, in 1697. The couple had two children:

- Maritje Maria Philipse (1687-1732), who married Jacobus Cromwell
- Frederick Philipse (1698-1751), who married Johanna Brockholst in 1726.

== Sources ==
- Eberlein, Harold D., and Cortlandt V. Hubbard. Historic Houses of the Hudson Valley. New York, 1942.
- Pelletreau, William S. History of Putnam County, New York. Philadelphia, 1886.
