= Connecticut panhandle =

Appendage of Connecticut, United States

Coordinates: 41.117°N 73.499°W

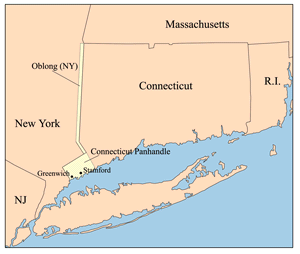
Connecticut panhandle and "The Oblong"

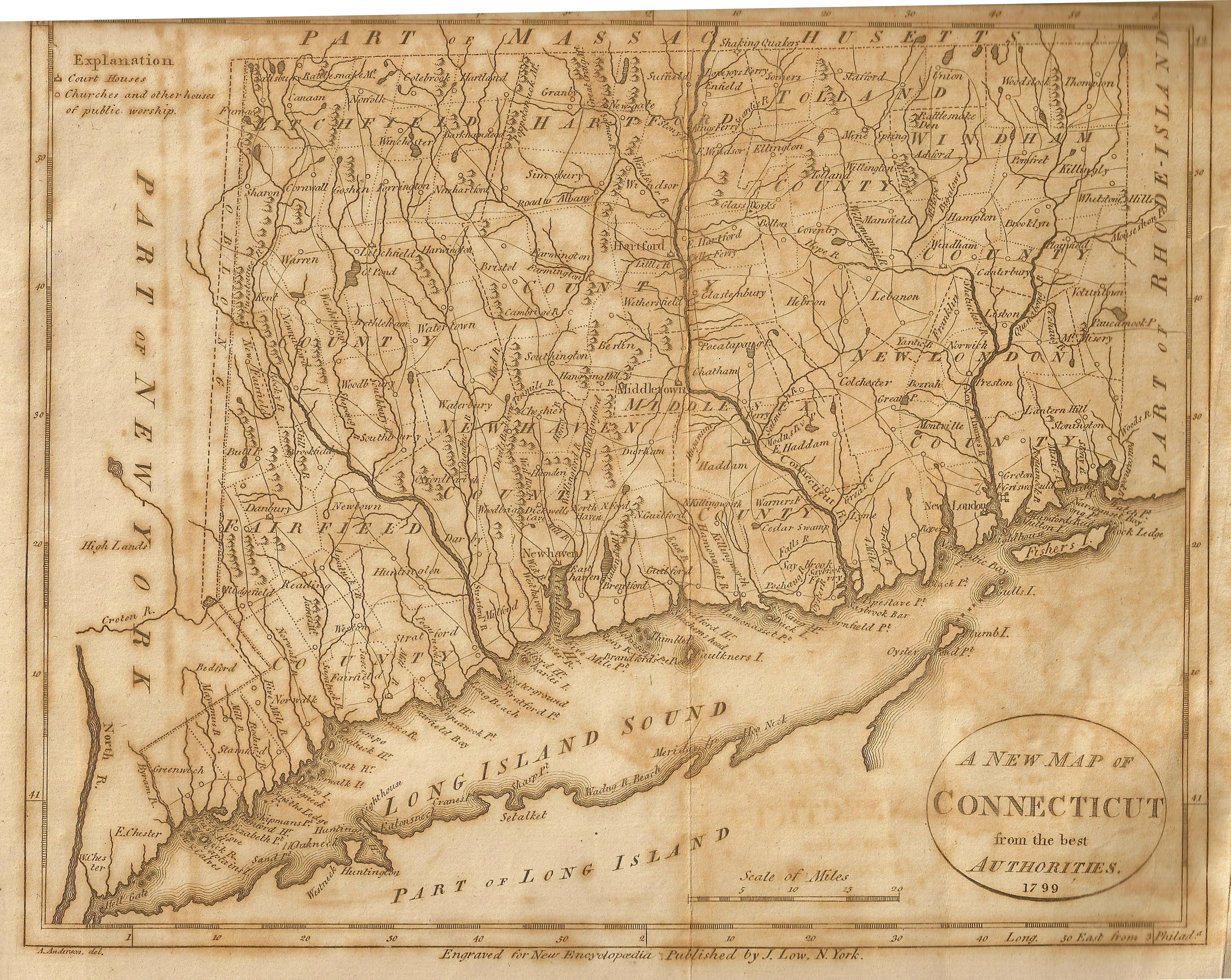
A 1799 map of Connecticut which shows The Oblong. From Low's Encyclopaedia

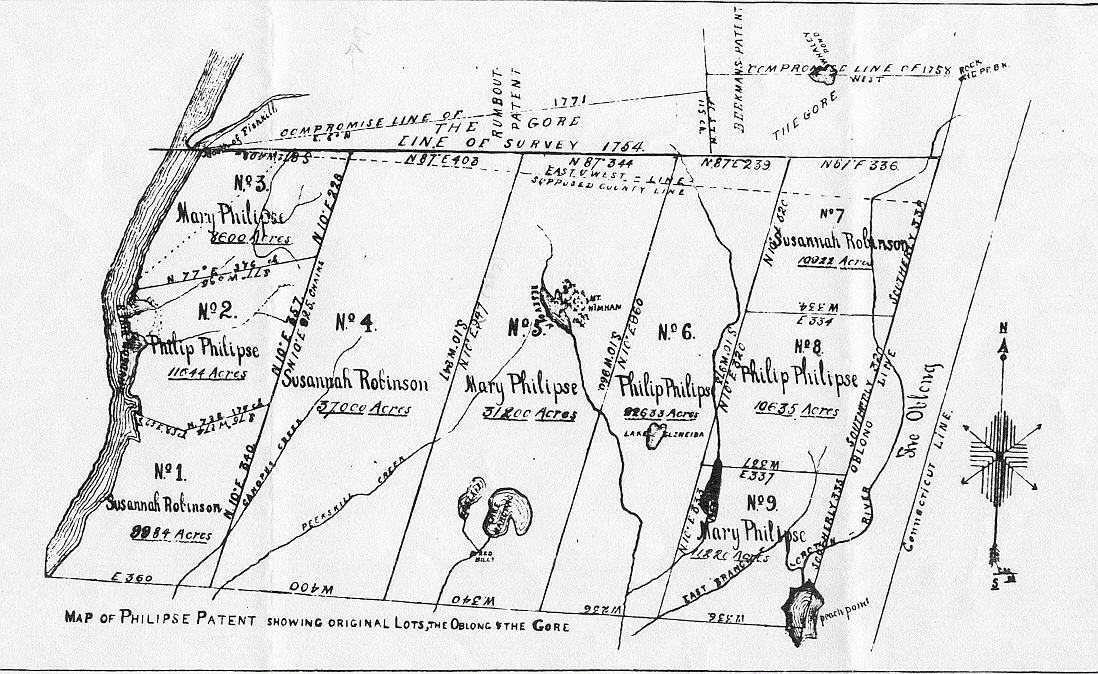
Map of Philipse Patent (showing the Oblong and Gore)

The Connecticut panhandle is the southwestern appendage of Connecticut, where it abuts New York State. It is contained entirely in Fairfield County and the Western Connecticut Planning Region, and includes all of Greenwich, Stamford, New Canaan, and Darien, as well as parts of Norwalk and Wilton. It has some of the most expensive residential real estate in the United States.

The irregularity in the boundary is the result of territorial disputes in the late 17th century between the British colonies of New York and Connecticut. In an agreement on November 28, 1683, that established the New York–Connecticut border as 20 miles (32 km) east of the Hudson River, New York gave up its claim to this area of 61,660 acres (249.5 km^{2}) east of the Byram River, whose residents considered themselves part of Connecticut. In exchange, New York received an equivalent area consisting of a 1.81-mile-wide (2.91 km) strip of land known as the "Oblong" running northwards from Ridgefield, Connecticut to the Massachusetts border, alongside the New York counties of Westchester, Putnam, and Dutchess. New York was also given undisputed claim to Rye, New York.

== See also ==
- Philipse Patent
- Border disputes between New York and Connecticut § Settling of the boundary
