= Margaret Hardenbroeck =

Dutch-born merchant and shipowner

- Born: Margareta Hardenbroeck c. 1637; Rhine Valley, Netherlands
- Died: c. 1691; Province of New York, British America
- Occupations: Shipowner, merchant
- Spouses: Peter Rudolphus de Vries (m. 1659; died 1661) Frederick Philipse (m. 1662)
- Children: Eva, Philip, Adolphus
- Parent: Adolph Hardenbruk

Margaret Hardenbroeck de Vries Philipse (c. 1637 – c. 1691) was a prominent and wealthy merchant in the colonial Province of New York. She inherited great wealth from her first husband after his early death, and later married another merchant and landowner, Frederick Philipse, who became 1st Lord of Philipse Manor.

== Early life ==
Margareta Hardenbroeck was born in the Rhine Valley of the Netherlands, the daughter of Adolph Hardenbruk (the surname later varied), a German emigrant who lived in New Jersey across from the Dutch colony of New Amsterdam, along with her older brother Abel Hardenbroeck, who came as an indentured servant to the Ten Eyck family.

== Career ==
She established herself in the burgeoning city in the late 1650s working in as a debt-collecting agent for her cousin, Wolter Valck. She also worked as a business agent for several Dutch merchants, trading small items such as pins, cooking oils, and vinegar in exchange for furs.

Margaret Hardenbroek's marriage to her second husband, Frederick Philipse, was conducted under Dutch law that permitted women to maintain their legal identity and do business in their own name, called usus. In addition, she signed a prenuptial agreement with him ensuring that her daughter would inherit all her former husband's wealth, as well as all or part of his and theirs together. Margaret Hardenbroek owned house lots in Manhattan and Bergen, and several ships including the New Netherland Indian, Beaver, Pearl, and Morning Star.

In 1664, the English occupied New Amsterdam and under the new administration's laws many of her former rights no longer applied. Though an accomplished businesswoman and merchant, as a woman she was no longer considered legally independent. She was unable to purchase goods under her own authority or act as legal agent. In addition, all the profits that had been made by her thriving businesses were now legally her husband's.

Despite this, Hardenbroeck continued to run the businesses, and with her wealth her husband was able to expand his holdings and become one of the wealthiest men in New York. Together, the couple purchased many properties, and expanded their transatlantic trading ventures. From her first marriage, Margaret owned several ships, one of them the King Charles. She made several voyages between Europe and America on these as supercargo responsible for all the purchases and sales of goods. Among the Philipses' top cargoes were slaves, being regarded among the biggest slaver traders in the northern Colonies, who also used slave labor extensively in their businesses and operation of their 52,000 acre Manor.

In 1698, though long a member of the governor's Executive Council, the English governor, Lord Bellomont, banned Frederick Philipse from government office for transporting slaves into New York.

== Personal life ==
On October 10, 1659, she married Peter Rudolphus de Vries but continued to do business under her maiden name. In 1660, they had a daughter:

- Eva de Vries (b. 1660), who married Jacobus Van Cortlandt (1658–1739), a wealthy merchant who served as the 30th and 33rd Mayor of New York City and was the brother of Stephanus Van Cortlandt.

In 1661, Peter Rudolphus de Vries died, leaving considerable property. Through her daughter, she was the grandmother of Frederick Van Cortlandt (1699–1749) and Mary Van Cortlandt (1705–1777), who married Peter Jay (b. 1701) in 1728, the parents of Founding Father John Jay (1745–1829).

=== Second marriage ===
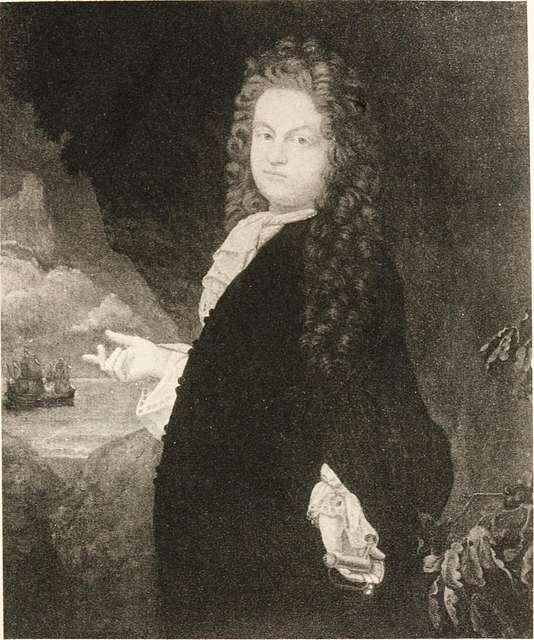
Frederick Philipse, 1st Lord of Philipse Manor and second husband of Margaret Hardenbroeck

In 1662, she married Frederick Philipse (1626–1702), in an usus marriage (under Dutch law). Philipse was merchant who through trade with the Indians and good relations with the governors had become one of the leading men of the Colony.

Upon their union, the court of Orphan Masters of New Amsterdam required her to render an inventory of her child's parental inheritance. Owing to its unsettled state she was unable to do so. Her husband overcame what were considerable difficulties by adopting her two-year-old daughter Eva, promising that if he had no children of his own she would inherit half of his estate, and if other children were born she would share equally with them. Together, the couple had several children, including:

- Philip Philipse (1663–1699), who married Maria Sparks (d. 1698), daughter of Governor Sparks of Barbados.
- Adolphus Philipse (1665–1750), who died unmarried.
- Annetje Philipse (b. 1667), who married Phillip French II (1666/7–1707), the 27th Mayor of New York City.
- Rombout Philipse (b. 1669)

== Descendants ==
Her grandson through her eldest son Philip, was Frederick Philipse II (1698–1751), the 2nd Lord of Philipsburg Manor who married Johanna Brockholst (1700–1765), daughter of Anthony Brockholls, acting Governor of Colonial New York. Johanna's sister, Susannah Brockholst (1696–1730), was married to Phillip French III, parents of Susanna French (1723–1789), who married William Livingston (1723–1790), "War-Governor" during the American Revolution, and was the mother of Henry Brockholst Livingston, who was associate Justice of the Supreme Court of the United States from 1806 to 1823.
