= Joseph Reade (politician) =

Prominent merchant in Colonial New York

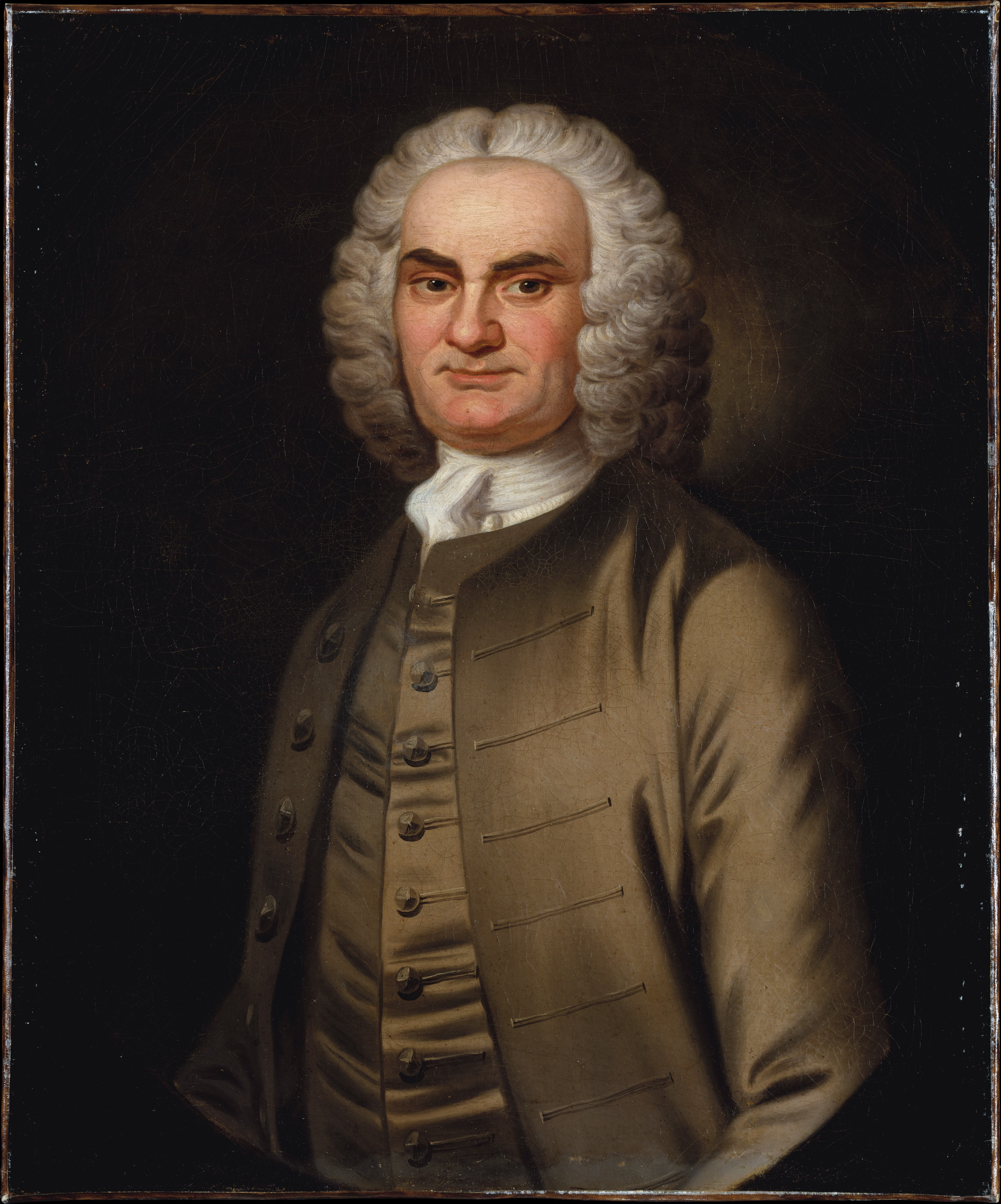
Portrait of Reade by John Wollaston.

Joseph Reade (1694 – March 2, 1771) was a merchant, vestryman, and politician from New York.

== Early life ==
Reade was a second-generation English prominent merchant. He was the son of English merchant Lawrence Reade, who arrived in New York from Saint Michael, Barbados, around 1691. His brother was John Reade. His sister, Mary Reade, was first married to William Vesey, the first rector of Trinity Church in Manhattan. After his death, she married Daniel Horsmanden, a chief justice of the supreme court in the Province of New York and member of the governor's executive council.

== Career ==
Reade was prominent in New York business, political and social life. He was first a member of the vestry of Trinity Church in 1715, and later a warden of the Church, a role in which he served for over fifty years.

In 1725, the same year he endorsed "a petition to ban the sale and export of spoiled flour", he was elected assessor of the East Ward of New York. Reade was appointed a member of the governor's council by then Governor of the Province of New York, Robert Monckton, in 1761, serving until his death in 1771. While on the council, he advised the next governor, Sir Henry Moore, and his Lt. Governor, Cadwallader Colden, to "delay the issuance of the stamped paper required by the unpopular Stamp Act."

Reade participated in the grand jury, with Frederick Philipse II as Justice of the Supreme Court of Judicature, of New York Slave Conspiracy trials of 1741 which, based upon questionable testimony, resulted in death sentences for thirty-four defendants and the deportation of ninety-one others away from the colony.

== Personal life ==
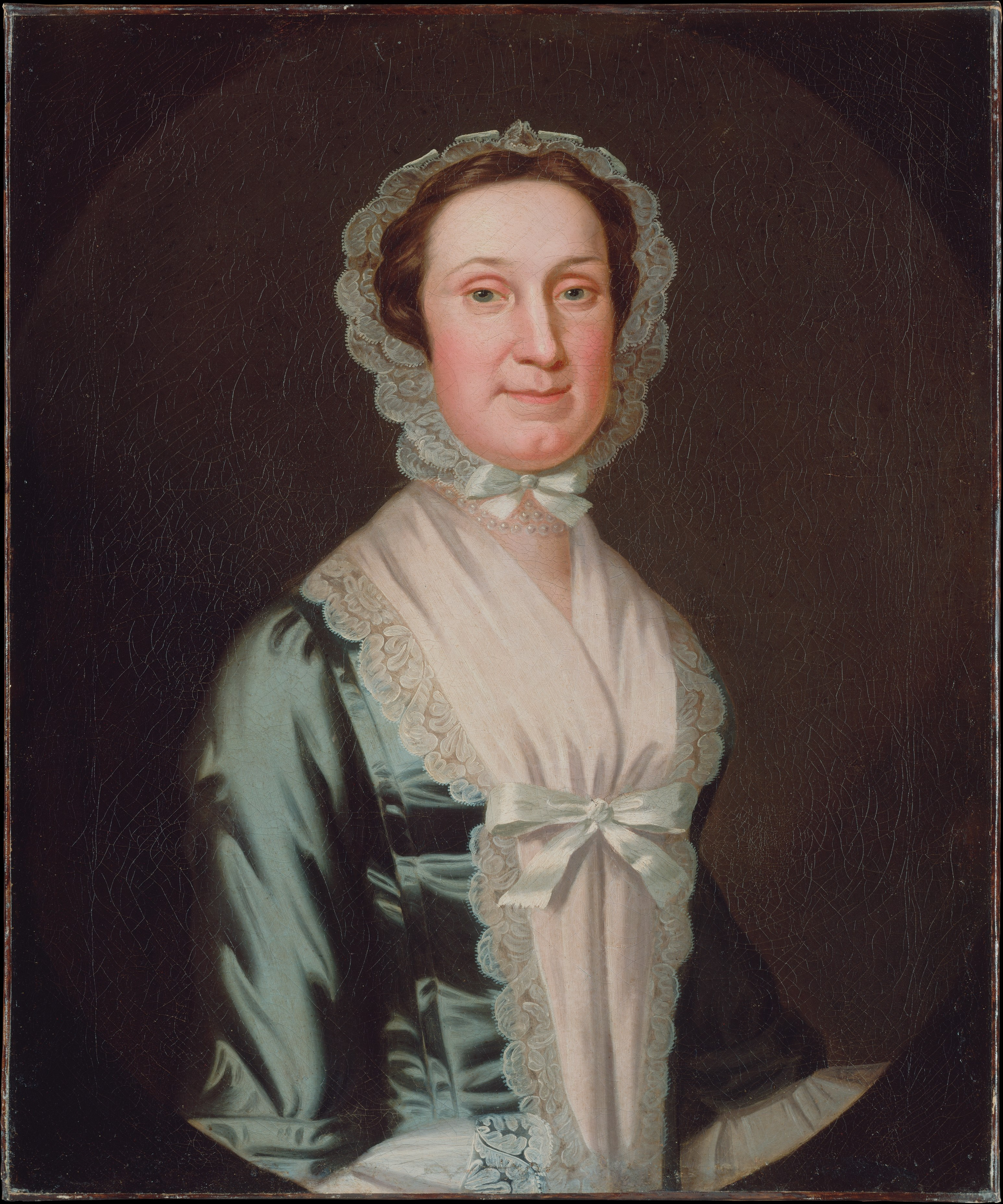
Portrait of Anna French Reade by John Wollaston.

In 1720, Reade married Anna French (1701–1778). Anna was the daughter of Phillip French, who served as the Mayor of New York City from 1702 to 1703, and Annetje (née Philipse) French, the daughter of Frederick Philipse, 1st Lord of Philipsburg Manor, a Dutch merchant and one of the richest men in colonial New York. Anna was the sister of Philip French III, who married Susanna Brokholst, daughter of Anthony Brockholst, acting Governor of Colonial New York under Sir Edmund Andros. Together, they were the parents of seven children, including:

- Laurence Reade (c. 1721–1773), who was a merchant in partnership with Richard Yates. In his will, Laurence acknowledged and provided for the three children he had with "a mulatto woman on the Island of Jamaica."
- Joseph Reade.
- John Reade.
- Anne Reade (1726–1772), who married Gerrit Van Horne (1726–1765), a grandson of Robert Livingston the Elder.
- Sarah Reade (1728–1802), who married James de Peyster (1726–1799), a son of treasurer Abraham de Peyster and grandson of New York mayor Abraham de Peyster.
- Mary Reade, who married Francis Stephens.

Reade died on March 2, 1771, at which point he had considerable holdings in mines, minerals, and ores, which were left to his three surviving sons in his will.

=== Descendants ===
Through his daughter Anne, he was the grandfather of Gerrit Van Horne Jr. (1758–1825), who married Ann Margaret Clarkson (1761–1824), the sister of General Matthew Clarkson, both children of David Clarkson and Elizabeth (née French) Clarkson, a cousin through the French family.

Through his daughter Sarah, he was the grandfather of James Abraham de Peyster (1753–1798), a Loyalist during the Revolutionary War who married Catherine Livingston (1759–1839) and moved to Saint John, New Brunswick, where he eventually became treasurer of the province; Sarah de Peyster (1761–1802); and Mary Reade de Peyster (1765–1790), who married Dr. Jacob Ogden Jr. (1762–1802) in 1789 (the parents of James de Peyster Ogden, the President of the New York Chamber of Commerce and Saint Nicholas Society of the City of New York).

Joseph was also the grandfather of Joseph Reade (d. 1809) and John Reade (1745–1808), who established a prominent freighting business and married Catherine Livingston (1756–1829) in 1774. They were the parents of Catherine Livingston Reade (1777–1863), wife of Nicholas William Stuyvesant (1769–1833); Helen Sarah Reade (1790–1879), wife of Erie Canal Commissioner James Hooker (1792–1858); and Anne Reade, the wife of Robert Kearney (grandparents of Anna Morton, the Second Lady of the United States).

=== Legacy ===
Reade Street in New York City's Lower Manhattan is named after him.
