= Campbell's Highlanders =

Campbell's Highlanders may refer to one of two Highland regiments in the British Army, both active 1760–1763:

- 100th Regiment of Foot (1760)
- 88th Regiment of Foot (Highland Volunteers)
