= Nathaniel Batts =

American fur trader, explorer and Native American interpreter

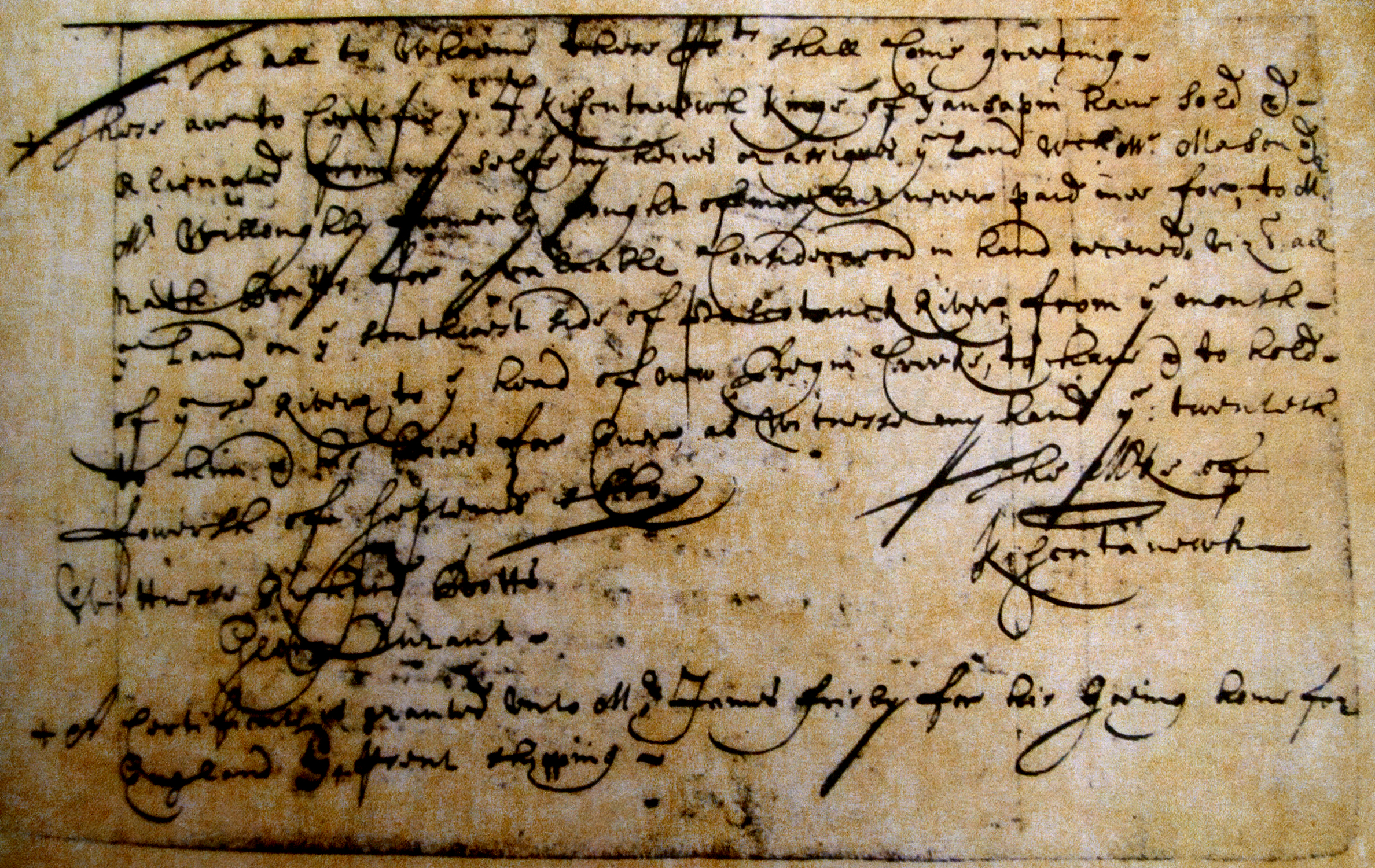
Nathaniel Batts Deed, 1660

Nathaniel Batts (died 1679) was a fur trader, explorer and Native American interpreter. He became the first recorded European to permanently settle in North Carolina in 1655. He often appears as Captain Nathaniel Batts in the records of Norfolk County, Virginia, where his wife owned land by her prior husband, Henry Woodhouse.

== Resident of Nansemond County, Virginia ==
Nathaniel owned 900 acres in Nansemond County, Virginia. County records for Nansemond have been destroyed, but an October 20, 1665 land grant to the orphans of Thomas Francis, deceased, recite that Thomas Francis had purchased 900 acres from Nathaniel Batts. The parcel had been "granted to Samuel Stephens on 20 July 1639, the patent being then for 2,000 acres, but upon strict survey found to contain the quantity aforesaid; by Stephens sould [sold] unto Nathaniell Batts, who sould [sold] to sd. Francis [Thomas Francis]."

Samuel Stephens (from whom Nathaniel Batts bought the 900 acre parcel), was Governor of North Carolina from 1667 until his death in 1669 and had married Frances Culpepper. Thomas Francis (to whom Nathaniel Batts sold the 900 acre parcel) was presumably the same Thomas Francis that with Thomas Dew, were in 1656 commissioned by the General Assembly of Virginia to "make discoveries between Cape Hatteras and Cape Fear."

== Early Landowner in North Carolina - 1660 Deed ==
Nathaniel Batts' deed from King Kiscutanewh of the Weapemeoc, for "ye land which Mr. Mason & Mr. Willoughby formerly bought of mee but never paid me for, to Mr. Nathaniel Batts for a valuable consideration in hand received, all ye Land on ye southwest side of Pascotanck River from ye mouth of ye sd. River to ye head of new Begin Creek" was witnessed by George Durant and Richard Batts in September 1660. The deed was recorded in Norfolk County, Virginia, but was for land located in present-day North Carolina.

Nathaniel presumably was living on this land on July 11, 1662, as indicated by a Northampton County, Virginia record binding "John Vines, Robert Foster, William Foster & Richard Stevens, Joyntly & Severally our Joynt or Several Heirs, Executors or Administrators to pay or cause to be paid to Nathaniel Batts Gent his heirs, Executors, Administrators or Assigns twelve good Cows under nine years old a piece to be delivered in “pascotanch River” [Pascotanck River in North Carolina] at ye house of ye said Nathaniel Batts Gent," which record was witnessed by Richard Foster and Samuel Pricklove. On August 2, 1662, Nathaniel Batts Gent. assigned over to John Curtis all his right and title in this bill, which assignment was witnessed by John Stringer and William Waters. Samuel Pricklove, witness of the bill, was evidently another early settler in the Roanoke region as evidenced by the March 1, 1661 deed of George Durant, which was recorded in Perquimans County. This is the first surviving [transcription of a] deed in North Carolina and it states that the land was "adjacent land formerly sold to Samuel Pricklove."

Approximately around the time of the preceding bill, on January 28, 1662 (this may have been 1663), "John Curtis of Northampton County in Virginia, Merchant, do acquitt & release Robert Foster of his part of a Bond that he was engaged to Nathaniel Batts Gent. for Land that was bought of ye said Batts and ye said Curtis do discharged ye said Foster for any claim of ye said Batts or any other person or persons that may lay any Claim." There is no further record of what "Land" this refers to or to where this land was located.

== Explorations to the Southward of Virginia / "Batts House" on 1657 Map ==
On May 8, 1654, a letter describing discoveries to the south of Virginia was written by Coll. Francis Yeardley (second son of George Yeardley) to John Farrar, Esq., wherein are numerous mentions of a “young man, a trader for beavers" who is referenced alternatively as “the young man the interpreter” or "interpreter," though the letter does not name Nathaniel by name. Nathaniel Batts and Coll. Francis Yeardley are found in records together in Maryland in 1653/54; they did not live there and are noted as "of Virginia". The Court and Testamentary Business, 1653/4, in Maryland show that "Cornelius Saunders, Carpenter, did sell Nathaniel Batts, Coll. Yardley's Interpreter, a parcel of sugar amounting by Agreement unto 19’ & of Beaver as by his Note to Richard Foster doth appear." A number of other records during this same time period in Maryland show that Francis Yeardley and Nathaniel Batts were working in partnership with one another, including one where Yeardley and Batts seized a vessel in Potomac River "because she came lately from trading at the Dutch plantations". The court found they could not show "lawful warrant" for seizing the vessel; Yeardley was fined 3,000 lbs of tobacco and cask and Batts was fined 1,000 lbs.

In 1655, a small house was built for Nathaniel Batts at Yeardley's expense and is depicted as "Batts House" on a manuscript map of "The South Part of Virginia" drawn in 1657 by a London cartographer, Nicholas Comberford. A carpenter, Robert Bodnam, sometime before the middle of July 1655, was sent "twice to the Southward" where he remained for a total of five months "ffor building a house for Batts to live in and trade with the Indians wch I did doe by Coll. Yeardley's Appointment and he did promise to see me paid for it." Surviving records of the case in Norfolk County show that the house was twenty feet square with two rooms and a chimney, for which Bodnam was awarded "One Thousand weight of Tobb and Caske" by the court."

The Francis Yeardley letter of 1654 describes that "In September last, a young man, a trader for beavers, being bound out to the adjacent parts to trade, by accident his sloop left him; and he, supposing she had gone to Rhoanoke, hired a small boat, and, with one of his company left with him, came to crave my license to go to look after his sloop, and sought some relief of provisions of me; the which granting he set forth with three more in company, one being of my family, the others were my neighbors..." In the letter, Yeardley refers to the voyage as "an ample discovery of South Virginia or Carolina."

At a Quarter Court held at James City on June 11, 1657 and recorded August 17, 1657 in the Minutes of Quarter Court of Virginia, “The court taking into consideration ye great paines & trouble which Mr. Nathaniell Batts hath taken in the discovery of an Inlett to the Southward, which is likely to be mutch advantagious to the Inhabitants of this Collony; have therefore ordered that ye said Batts be hereby protected from all his creditors within this Country for one year & a day, without any trouble or molestacon upon consideration that the said Batts shall always be ready upon ye Courteous service, & to petition to the next Assembly for Confirmation hereof. Test: Thomas Brereton". Present at this proceeding, were Col. William Claiborne, Col. Thomas Pettus, Lt. Col. Walker, Mr. Nathaniel Bacon, Col. George Read and Col. Abraham Wood and Captain Francis Willis.

== Interactions with the Natives to the Southward of Virginia ==
The house built in 1655 at Francis Yeardley's expense was "for Batts to live in and trade with the Indians". Circa 1655/56, Norfolk County, Virginia records show that prior orders restraining Nathaniel from trading with the Indians were reversed, "It is ordered that a former order granted against Nathaniel Batts by ye Comrs of ye Melitia restraining ye sd Batts from goeing unto or trading wth the Indians be reversed & disaanulled".

The last appearance of Nathaniel Batts in the records of Virginia are in August 1663. The records of Accomack County, Virginia include depositions showing some political disagreement concerning the "Indians in the south," but it is not clear what the circumstances are. Deposition was made by John Marvell on August 18, 1663 that "about five or six weeks ago he was at John Waltham's house where he saw Capt. Batts and others with him, but did not see any weapons or hostile behavior". On the same date, David Gibbins deposed that "at his master John Waltham's house, he saw Capt. Batts and his men, who were not armed and did not stand guard". The Court Orders of November 11, 1663 reveal that it was "ordered that John Waltham be dismissed from the office of constable", with Richard Kellum appointed constable instead. At the same court, "By the governor's command, John Waltham, Peter Walker and Richard Stevens were questioned about their actions among the Indians in the south" and "John Waltham was charged for entertaining Nathaniel Batts and his company at his house".

Three days before the depositions in Accomack County, Virginia, the following record appears in Northampton County, Virginia, which references a list of accounts under the heading "An account of ye charge of Nathaniel Batts and his companies apprehending ye 15th of August 1663 by warrant of Coll. John Stringer". Among the account entries are various accounts "To a guard of" a specified number of men on specified dates over a period of days and "To Mr. John Curtis for 26 Men from Satterday neight tell Thursday morning is 4 days & 5 nights provisions for them; and the troubles of his house". These accounts were presented to the court on September 1, 1663. No further records have been found to explain the circumstances of these records found in Accomack and Northampton Counties, Virginia.

John Curtis is presumably the same "Mr. John Curtis Guardian of Argoll Yardley" (Argoll Yeardley Jr.) as noted in Northampton County, Virginia records. It appears his sister, Anne, was wife of Argoll Yeardley (Sr.). Argoll Yeardley was brother of Francis Yeardley, who was associated with Nathaniel Batts as mentioned elsewhere herein. On December 5, 1654, John Curtis of Northampton purchased from Francis Yeardley, "one neck of land, north side of Nuswattack Creek, between two branches, commonly called Davis' Necke."

== (Possible) Travel to New Amsterdam (New York) in 1663 ==
New Amsterdam became New York in 1664.

The Court Minutes of New Amsterdam on 3 April 1663, include two entries, seemingly unrelated, but which appear immediately adjacent to one another. One entry refers to a “Nathaniel Badts” and the other to a “Nathaniel Bats”. It is not known if this is Nathaniel Batts of Virginia and Carolina, but it is an interesting possibility to consider. Considering that Mr. Balthazar de Haart, referenced below, had traveled to Virginia in 1662, this might increase the likelihood of that possibility.

Anneken Litscho, pltf. v/s Nathanial Badts, defendant. Plaintiff demands 76 guilders 13 stivers. Defendant says he has not received any account thereof and demands it. The court ordered the plaintiff to furnish account.

Anneken Litscho was widow of Daniel Liczko. They owned a tavern and inn and some have interpreted the preceding record as concerning amounts due for payments to Anneken as “landlady” of Nathaniel; the entry subsequent to this one note that Nathaniel had goods “still at his lodgings,” which suggests he was traveling. Of note, in 1651, Daniel Liczko took part in an expedition on the Delaware River against Sweden. (See links to New Albion (colony), including reference to 1651 Map of Virginia and reference to Captain John Batte therein.)

Daniel de Haart, pltf. v/s Nathaniel Bats, defendant. Plaintiff sold to defendant on the 26 March last, “some good for the sum of 227 guilders 12 stivers in beavers pay, on condition he should give bail for the pay, wherein he has failed to this date.” The defendant (Nathaniel) admitted to having bought the goods on such condition, and said the same are still at his lodgings. Defendant ordered to pay Plaintiff.

Daniel de Haart, plaintiff, is referenced in an earlier record 13 June 1662 which states that Tomas Wandel [Thomas Wandell], defendant, stated that his brother Mr. Balthazar de Haart “offered him goods to sell in the Virginias on half the largest profit; that his brother had charged so high for the goods, that he could not sell them for the price and he returned a part of the good in Virginia to Mr. Balthazar de Haart.” Another record dated 3 March 1662 states that “Whereas Daniel de Haart remains the agent of his brother Balthasar de Haart, who has gone to the Virginias and hence to Old England.”

== George Fox (Quaker) Visits Carolina and Nathaniel Batts in 1672 ==
Quaker missionary, George Fox, and his party on October 2, 1672 during travel through Carolina, "came to captaine Batts & there most of us lay that night by the fire." George Fox refers to Nathaniel as "the Old Governor" and "Nathaniel Batts, who had been Governor of Roan-oak. He went by the name of Captain Batts, and had been a Rude, desperate man who has great command over ye countrie, especially over ye Indians." An epistle addressed by George Fox to some Friends in Virginia in 1673 reads, “I received letters giving me an account of the service some of you had with and amongst the Indian king and his council, and If you go over again to Carolina, you may enquire of Captain Batts [Capt. Nathaniel Batts], the old Governor, with whom I left a paper to be read to the Emperor, and his thirty kings under him, of the Tuscaroras, who were come to treat for peace with the people of Carolina.” The 1672/73 records of George Fox and his travels to Carolina are the last accounts of Nathaniel Batts being alive. Despite Nathaniel Batts being an early settler and resident of North Carolina, his name appears in only two state records within North Carolina and his name is not known to appear in any surviving county records in North Carolina. His September 1660 deed recorded in Norfolk County, Virginia was for land located in present-day Pasquotank County, North Carolina, for which records do not survive prior to circa 1700.

== Personal and family life ==
A Northumberland County, Virginia record on November 28, 1653, states the "court determined that" the death of George Leicham, marryner, "resulted from the disorderly and abusive drunkenness of Nathanial Batts, Thomas Bell, Peter Delabella, Richard Foundred and Sibilla (the wife of Christopher Jarvis)." A Norfolk County record circa 1655/56 shows that Nathaniel Batts was ordered to be set in ye stocks and remain during the pleasure of ye court in response to "Mr. Nathaniel Batts for being in drinke & threatening Mr. Conquest."

On May 25, 1656, Nathaniel married Mary Woodhouse, widow and second wife of Colonel Henry Woodhouse. The marriage contract of Nathaniel Batts was dated April 20, 1656 and was witnessed by William Clayborne Junior (son of William Claiborne), Roger Green and John Ayres. The marriage contract stated that Nathaniel was "indebted to some men in Virginia and am now intended to bee married to Mrs. Mary Woodhouse ye relect & widow of Henry Woodhouse deceased, I doe by these presents firmely bind & engage my selfe not to meddle with any of ye said widdowes estate..." Henry Woodhouse was son of Henry Woodhouse, who had been governor of Bermuda around 1626 or 1627. The will of Henry Woodhouse names wife Maria/Mary and brother-in-law Charles Sothern; thus, it is possible that the maiden name of Mary Woodhouse Batts was Sothern. Charles Sothern may be the Charles Southern that died in 1671 in Bermuda, leaving will.

A number of non-primary sources claim that Nathaniel Batts had a brother Richard Batts, a sea captain that possibly traded with Barbados; however, no original sources have been found to support these claims.

Later he purchased an island in Albemarle Sound near the mouth of the Yeopim River that became known as Batts Island. Some charts refer to the island as Batts Grave (formerly known as Heriots Island) since he lived a solitary life on the island and was buried there. The island eroded through the years and was totally destroyed by a hurricane in 1950. Nathaniel Batts had a close friendship with Kickowanna, the daughter of an Algonquian Chief. In his later years, Nathaniel spent more time with Native Americans than he did with other European settlers. The narratives on Nathaniel Batts living a solitary life on the island and having a close friendship with Kickowanna is not confirmed by review of primary sources. The narrative appears to originate from the book “Literature in the Albemarle” by Bettie Freshwater Pool, published in 1915, who recounts the “Legend of Batz’s Grave,” a story about a trader named Jesse Batz who fell in love with a Chowanoke maiden named Kickowanna. Ms. Pool referenced a Col. R. B. Creecy's book entitled “Grandfather’s Tales” written in 1902 as her source. Col. Creecy was born in 1813 at Drummond's Point on the Albemarle Sound and lived till at least 1905.

Nathaniel was dead by December 1679, for on December 5, 1679, Joseph Chew, who married the relict of the dec’d, applied to administer the estate of Nathaniel Batts. Signed by John Harvey, John Jenkins, Nath. Slocum, Robt. Holden. On December 10, 1679, Joseph Chew and James Blunt of Shaftsbury Precinct in Albemarle County posted bond of 50,000 pounds of tobacco for said Chew to administer the estate of the dec’d. Witnessed by John Jenkins, Robt. Holden.

A court held by the council in September 1694 (The North Carolina Higher-Court Records 1670–1696) reveal that Nathaniel Batts, who was long deceased at the time, had sold land to William Woollard, who had been warned to the contrary to buy it. The record states that “Your Orators Edward Smithweck and John Smithweck sonnes and heirs of Hugh Smithweck Late of precinct of Chowan deceased Humbly Sheweth That whereas your Orators Father Hugh Smithweck comeing into this County about some 35 yeares since did seat upon a peece of Land in Chowan precinct and from time to time paid quitt rents for it being 416 Acres That sometime about 18 years since one Nathaniel Batts seats downe upon part of the said tract of Land and in some small time after sells his right to his Labour of the said Land where he satt downe to one William Woollard who although often warned to the contrary would buy it That sometime after your Orators Father dyeing your Orator Edward Smithweck did make continuall Claime to the said Land whereon the said Woollard did live and which he bought of the Said Batts aforesaid and your Orators att a Court holden for the precinct of Chowan about some 5 yeares since did there upon the same place make Claime of the said Land and forwarne the said Woollard dyes makeing his widow then knowne by the name of Sarah Woollard his executrix Your Orators sometime after did goe and take peaceable possession of their Lawfull right as being part of their said 416 Acres for which their father [paid] quitt rents for upon which [the] said Sarah Woollard Comences an action of trespass against your Orators and thereupon making Oath herself before the worshipfull Court and Jury that she had lost 80 head of Hoggs of 15 shillings…” The record goes on to say Sarah Woollard married Thomas Gillam and that Hugh Smithweck's claim was for only 370 acres of the said tract.
