= 100th Regiment of Foot (1760) =

100th Regiment of Foot (Campbell's Highlanders)
- Active: 1760–1763
- Country: United Kingdom
- Branch: British Army
- Type: Line Infantry
- Size: One battalion
- Engagements: Invasion of Martinique; Siege of Havana (detachment)

The 100th Regiment of Foot, also known as Campbell's Highlanders, was an infantry regiment of the British Army, formed in 1760 and disbanded in 1763. It saw service in the Caribbean during the Seven Years' War.

== History ==
The regiment was raised in 1760 by combining four independent companies of infantry raised in Argyll by Alexander Ross, Neil Campbell, Alexander Macdonald and John MacHarg. They were formed into a regiment in 1761. It was at first sent for garrison duty in Jersey, where it was joined by a fifth independent company raised under Thomas Nightingale, then sailed for the Caribbean in September 1761. At this point the regiment had a strength of 521 men.

In 1762, they saw service at the Invasion of Martinique from France, in a brigade under General William Haviland, with a detachment serving at the Siege of Havana in a brigade under Lord Rollo, where it took heavy losses. By September 1763, only seven officers and 140 men were fit for service. With the end of the Seven Years' War in 1763, the regiment returned to the United Kingdom and was disbanded in Scotland.

The unofficial title Campbell's Highlanders was adopted from its first Major-Commandant, Colin Campbell; a similar title was used, at the same time, by the 88th Foot.

== Major Campbell ==
While in Jersey, Captain John MacHarg embezzled the money meant for his company's pay, leaving the soldiers to beg in the streets, and leading to an attack which burned down the pay office. MacHarg was later killed by his commander, Major Colin Campbell, who was tried by court-martial for murder but escaped, and was dismissed from the Army. Major John Broughton was appointed commander for the remainder of the regiment's existence. Broughton was formerly a captain in the 45th Regiment of Foot.

On his return to England in 1764 Campbell brought charges against General Robert Monckton, the commander of the expedition, alleging ill-treatment of both himself and his regiment, including objections that they had been made to change their weapons with another unit, kept from the fighting, and used to transport ammunition. The trial considered that this was because the men were unfit for service, mostly old men and boys, and dismissed all of Campbell's complaints.

== Sources ==
- Brander, Michael (1971). The Scottish highlanders and their regiments. Seeley, Service and Co. ISBN 0-85422-012-7.
- Whitton, Frederick Ernest (1924). The History of the Prince of Wales's Leinster Regiment (Royal Canadians): Volume 1: The Old Army.
