= 90th Regiment of Foot (disambiguation) =

Three regiments of the British Army have been numbered the 90th Regiment of Foot:

- 90th Regiment of Foot (1759), raised in 1759
- 90th Regiment of Foot (Yorkshire Volunteers), raised in 1779
- 90th Regiment of Foot (Perthshire Volunteers), raised in 1794
