= John Ury =

John Ury (died 29 August 1741) was a Non-juring Anglican priest who was falsely accused of being a Catholic priest, a Spanish spy, and the mastermind of the New York Slave Insurrection of 1741. His ability to read Latin was cited as proof of this. Under legislation passed in 1700, merely being a Catholic priest was a crime punishable by life imprisonment in the Colony of New York.

== Background and career ==
He was the son of a former secretary of the South Sea Company. William Kearns, quoting Flynn's The Catholic Church in N.J. (1904), mentions him as "a Catholic priest, who had exercised unostentatiously his sacred ministry in New Jersey, and had been engaged for about twelve months in teaching at Burlington, New Jersey." Albert J. Menendez identifies Ury as a Non-juring High Church Anglican Vicar who supported the House of Stuart's claim to the British throne and opposed the Glorious Revolution of 1689. Martin I.J. Griffin says "Ury was not a Roman Catholic priest, but a non-juror of the Church of England and a graduate of Cambridge University".

In the spring of 1740, a number of Spanish sailors arrived in New York as captured crew of prize ships taken by British captains. Those who were dark-skinned were assumed to be slaves and sold at auction with the ship and its cargo. On June 13, 1741, five of these sailors were arraigned and charged with being involved in the plot. As Britain was at war with Spain, this increased the appearance of guilt. A search was then made for any Catholic sympathizers that might be in the city.

For at least ten days before his arrest Ury had been under suspicion of being a Catholic priest. In her initial statement of April 22, Mary Burton, the prosecution's main witness, testified that the Hughsons and Margaret Kerry were the only whites involved. All three were hanged on June 12. Burton then amended her statement and identified Ury as "the real power behind the slave conspiracy", he was taken into custody on June 24, 1741. He was arraigned on July 15 and 22. Having no lawyer willing to defend him, he defended himself at the trial. Throughout, Ury expressed his innocence. He produced witnesses who testified he was just what he claimed to be, a teacher of ancient languages. He tried to show that he was a Non-juring Anglican priest, and denied being a Catholic. The chief prosecutor was Attorney General Richard Bradley.

At this time James Oglethorpe, founder and governor of Georgia, sent word to Prosecutor Joseph Murray that he had information that the Spanish were planning a secret attack on the British colonies:

Some intelligence I had of a villainous design of a very extraordinary nature and, if true, very important, viz. that the Spaniards had employed emissaries to burn all the magazines and considerable towns in the English North America, thereby to prevent the subsisting of the great expedition and fleet in the West Indies. And for this purpose many priests were employed who pretended to be physicians, dancing masters, and other kinds of occupations, and under that pretence to get admittance and confidence in families."

Oglethorpe's letter left little doubt that the colony was part of an international conspiracy, one which not only planned to infiltrate and destroy the city of New York, but also to engage its Protestant citizens in religious warfare.

Ury was found guilty of conspiracy on July 29, 1741, and hanged in New York City on August 29, 1741.
