= Francis Harison =

American politician

Francis Harison (died 1740) was a lawyer and politician in colonial New York.

== Life ==
He was the son of Rev. William Harison (died 1694), Rector of Cheriton, England. He came to New York in 1708.

On October 5, 1721, Harison was appointed Judge of Admiralty for New York, Connecticut and the Jerseys, in place of Caleb Heathcote, deceased. Harison was Recorder of New York City from 1725 to 1735 when he returned to England.

His son George Harison was the father of U.S. Attorney Richard Harison.

== Sources ==
- The New York Civil List compiled by Franklin Benjamin Hough (page 428; Weed, Parsons and Co., 1858)
- The Council of Revision of the State of New York by Alfred B. Street (Albany, 1858; page 75)
- And the Walls Came Tumbling Down by Michael S. Lief & Harry M. Caldwell (pages 212f)
- Harison genealogy at North County website

Legal offices
Preceded by David Jamieson	Recorder of New York City; 1725–1735	Succeeded by Daniel Horsmanden
