= Portrait of Robert Monckton =

Painting by Benjamin West

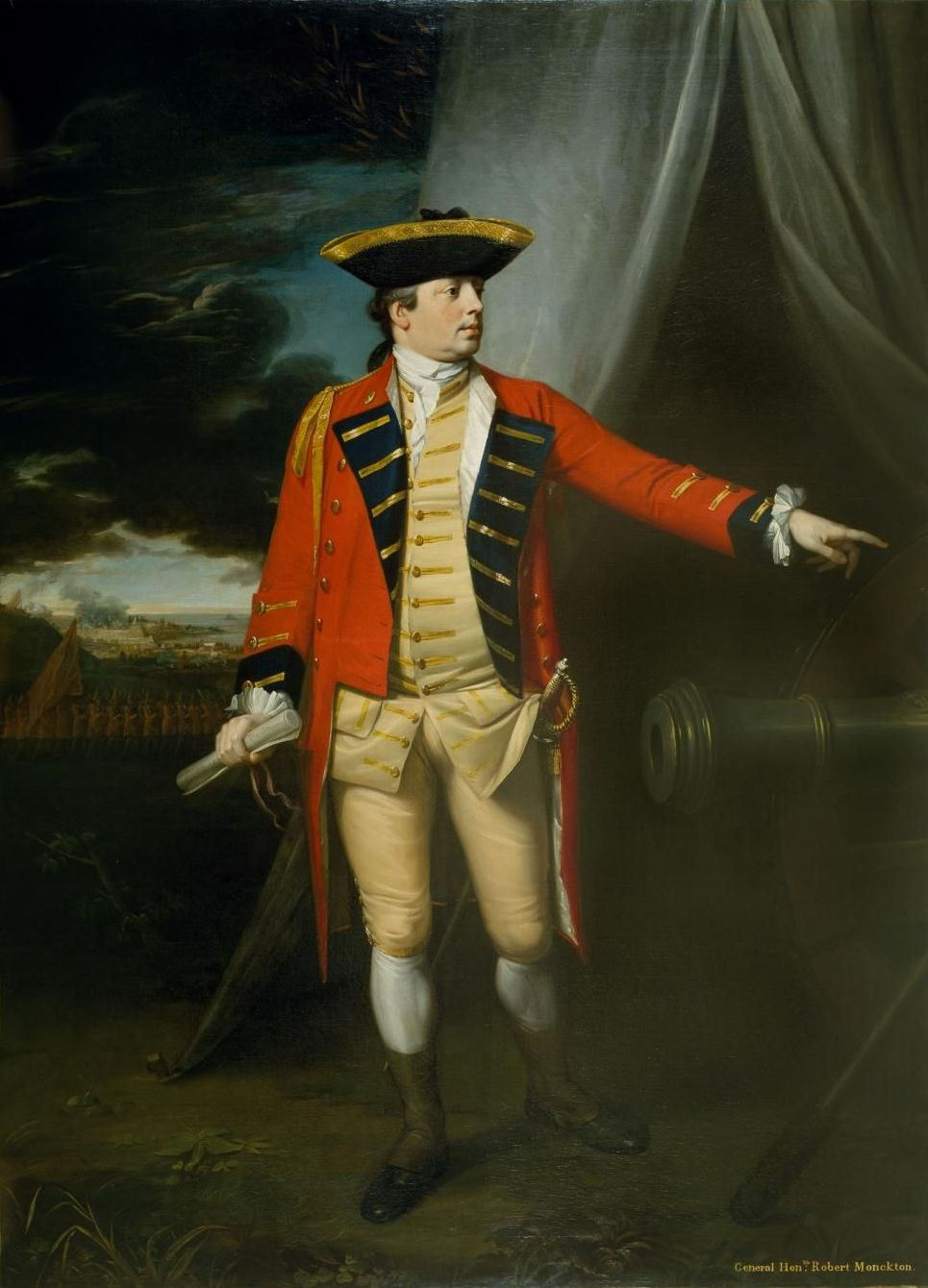
- Artist: Benjamin West
- Year: c.1763
- Type: Oil on canvas, portrait
- Dimensions: 229 cm × 169 cm (90 in × 67 in)
- Location: National Army Museum, London

Portrait of Robert Monckton is a 1763 portrait painting by the American artist Benjamin West. It depicts the British soldier Robert Monckton, noted for his service during the Seven Years' War. Monckton had been second-in-command to James Wolfe during the Siege of Quebec in 1759 and was wounded at the Battle of the Plains of Abraham. It commemorates his subsequent command during the Invasion of Martinique in which the French-controlled was captured. The city of Moncton in New Brunswick is named after him. He is dressed in the uniform of a major general and holds a map in his hand. In the background on the left the conquest of Martinique is decpicted.

It was an important early commission for the Pennsylvania-born artist coming soon after he had arrived in London. He depicts Monckton in the stance of the Apollo Belvedere. Sir Joshua Reynolds encouraged West to exhibit the painting at the Exhibition of 1764 held by the Society of Artists in 1764. The painting is now in the collection of the National Army Museum in Chelsea. A mezzotint was produced from the image by the Irish engraver James Watson, a copy of which is now in the British Museum.

== Bibliography ==
- McNairn, Alan. Behold the Hero: General Wolfe and the Arts in the Eighteenth Century. McGill-Queen's Press, 1997.
- Reid, Stuart. Quebec 1759: The battle That Won Canada. Bloomsbury Publishing, 2013.
