= Invasion of Martinique (1762) =

1762 invasion of the Seven Years' War

- Part of the Seven Years' War
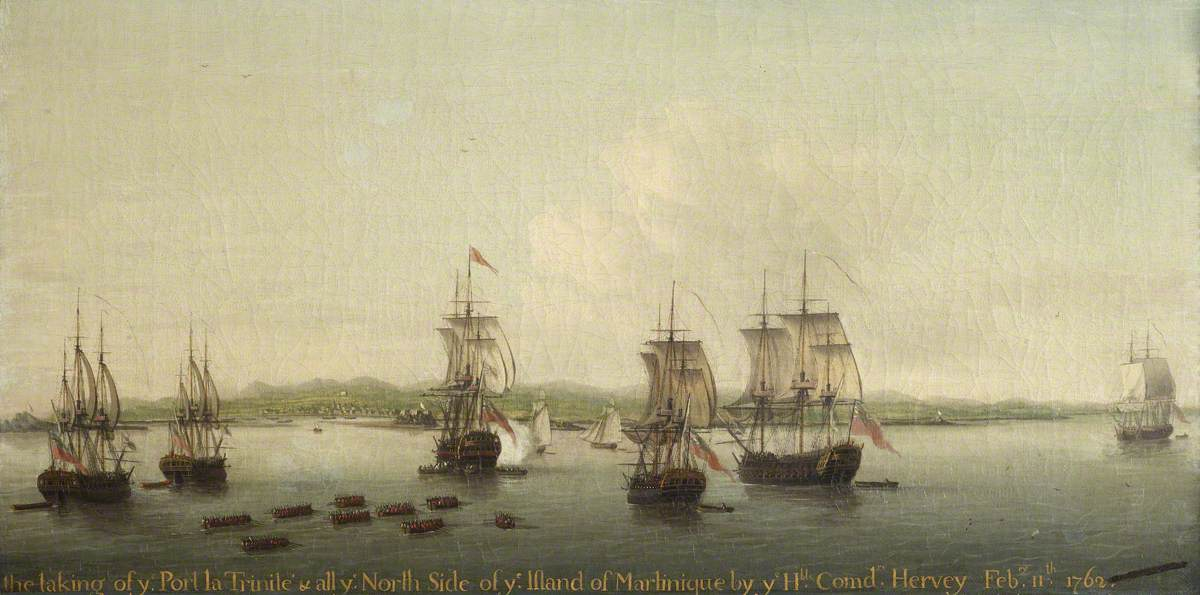
- The Capture of Martinique, 11 February 1762; Dominic Serres, 1766
Date	5 January – 12 February 1762
Location	Martinique, French West Indies 14.66°N 61°W
Result	British victory

Belligerents
Great Britain: British America	France

Commanders and leaders
Robert Monckton; George Rodney	François V de Beauharnais (surrendered)

Strength
8,000 regulars and militia	1,200 regulars 7,000 militia 4,000 hired privateers

The invasion of Martinique was the capture of the French colony of Martinique in the West Indies by British forces between January and February 1762 during the Seven Years' War.

== Background ==
Following Britain's capture of Dominica in June 1761, the French fully expected Martinique to be the next British target. Accordingly, they took measures for their defense. The French force in Martinique consisted of 1,200 regulars, 7,000 local militia and 4,000 hired privateers. Furthermore, the mountainous nature of the island made it rather easy to defend.

The neighbouring British islands did what they could to help the mother-country:

- Antigua sent blacks and part of her old garrison, the 38th Regiment of Foot, which had not left her since Queen Anne's day;
- Barbados raised 500 black and 500 white men, which were the more acceptable since that island was the rendezvous for the expedition.

The first British troops to arrive in Carlisle Bay were a detachment from Belle Île off the coast of France, which had captured the previous year, consisting of:

- 69th Regiment of Foot
- 76th Regiment of Foot under William Rufane
- 90th Morgan's Regiment of Foot
- 98th Grey's Regiment of Foot

On 24 December 1761, the main army from America under the sails of Rear-Admiral of the Blue George Rodney and command of Brigadier Robert Monckton arrived in Carlisle Bay. This army was made up of eleven regiments:

- 15th Regiment of Foot
- 17th Regiment of Foot
- 22nd Regiment of Foot
- 27th (Inniskilling) Regiment of Foot
- 28th Townshend's Regiment of Foot
- 35th Regiment of Foot
- 40th Armiger's Regiment of Foot
- 42nd Royal Highland Regiment of Foot (2 battalions)
- 43rd Talbot's Regiment of Foot
- 46th Thomas Murray's Regiment of Foot
- 3rd battalion of the 60th Royal American Regiment of Foot
- American rangers (a few companies)

In all, the force entrusted to Monckton must have amounted to 8,000 men.

== Invasion ==
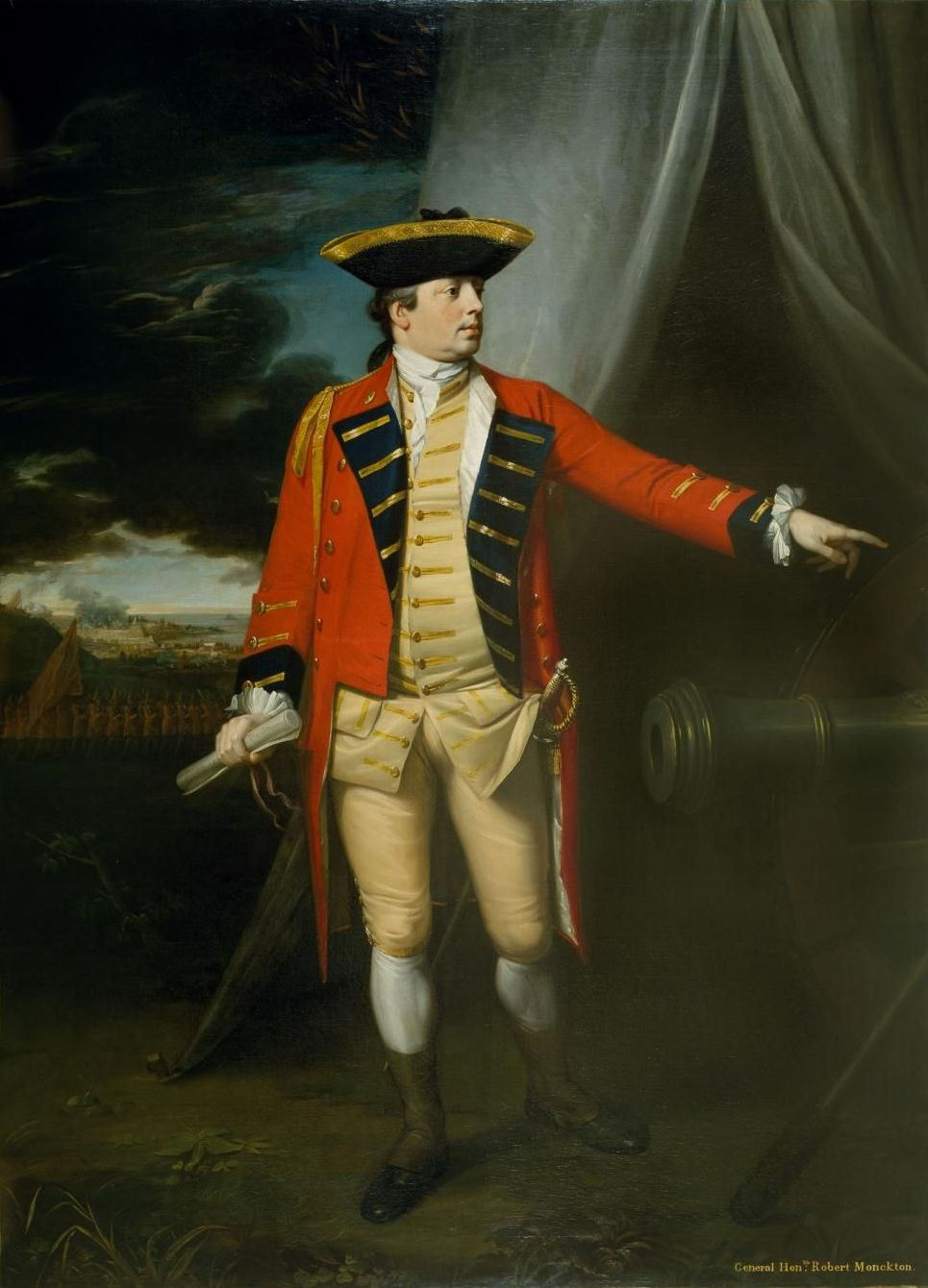
Portrait of Robert Monckton by Benjamin West, 1763 (National Army Museum)

On 5 January 1762, the British transports weighed anchor and sailed away to leeward, under escort of Admiral Rodney's fleet, past the Pitons of Saint Lucia and past the port of Castries. Two days later the British amphibious force anchored in Sainte-Anne Bay, just round the southern extremity of Martinique, on the western side. Two brigades were then landed in Les Anses-d'Arlet, a bay farther up the western coast, from which they marched to the south of the bay that forms the harbor of the capital, Fort-Royal. Finding the road impracticable for transport of guns, they were re-embarked.

On 16 January, the entire British army was landed without loss of a man at Case Navire, a little to the north of Negro Point. This point forms the northern headland of the harbour, and had at its foot a road leading due east over the mountains to Fort Royal, some 5 kilometres (3.1 mi) away. The way was blocked by deep gullies and ravines, and the French had erected redoubts at every strategic point, as well as batteries on a hill beyond, named Morne Tortenson. Monckton was thus compelled to erect batteries to silence the French guns before he could advance farther.

By 24 January, British batteries were completed, and at daybreak a general attack was made under the fire of the batteries upon the French defenses on Morne Tortenson, a party being at the same time detached to turn the enemy's right flank. The turning movement was completely successful and the redoubts by the sea, on the enemy's left, having been carried, the troops stormed post after post, until at 9:00 they were in possession not only of the detached redoubts but of the entire position of Morne Tortenson, with its guns and entrenchments. The French retired in great confusion, some to Fort Royal and some to Morne Grenier, a still higher hill to the north of Morne Tortenson. Simultaneously two brigades under Brigadiers Haviland and Walsh attacked other French posts to the north of Morne Tortenson and, after great difficulty owing to the steepness of the ground, succeeded in driving them back to Morne Grenier. The losses of the British in this action amounted to 33 officers and 350 men killed and wounded.

On 25 January, Monckton, now within range of Fort Royal, began to throw up batteries against its citadel. However, the persistent fire from Morne Grenier led him to instead target that position first. On the afternoon of 27 January, before Monckton had time to launch an attack on them, the French entrenched at Morne Grenier suddenly debouched in 3 columns and launched an attack upon Haviland's brigade and the Light Infantry of the army, on Monckton's left. During this attack, one French column exposed its flank to the Highlanders and was almost instantly routed. The two remaining columns thereupon gave way, and the whole fled back to Morne Grenier with the British in chase. The pursuers plunged down into the intervening ravine after the French and swarming up Morne Grenier "by every path, road, and passage where men could run, walk, or creep," hunted the fugitives headlong before them. Night came on, but the British officers would not stop until they had cleared every Frenchman off the hill and captured all of the works and guns. Monckton at once sent off more troops to support the pursuers. By 1:00 am on 28 January, Morne Grenier was securely occupied, at a cost of little more than 100 British killed and wounded. The batteries on Morne Tortenson were then completed, new batteries were constructed within 370 metres (1,210 ft) of the citadel.

On 3 February, Fort Royal surrendered. By 12 February, the rest of the Island had been reduced.

The regiments employed in Martinique, complete or in detachments, were the 4th, 15th, 17th, 22nd, 27th, 28th, 35th, 38th, 40th, 42nd (two battalions), 43rd, 48th, 3/60th, 65th, 69th, Morgan's 90th, Rufane's 76th (two battalions), 77th (Montgomerie's Highlanders), Vaughan's 94th, Stuart's 97th, Grey's 98th, Campbell's 100th, two companies of American Rangers, ten companies of Barbados Volunteers. The American Rangers included 150 Native Americans from Carolina, including Silver Heels.

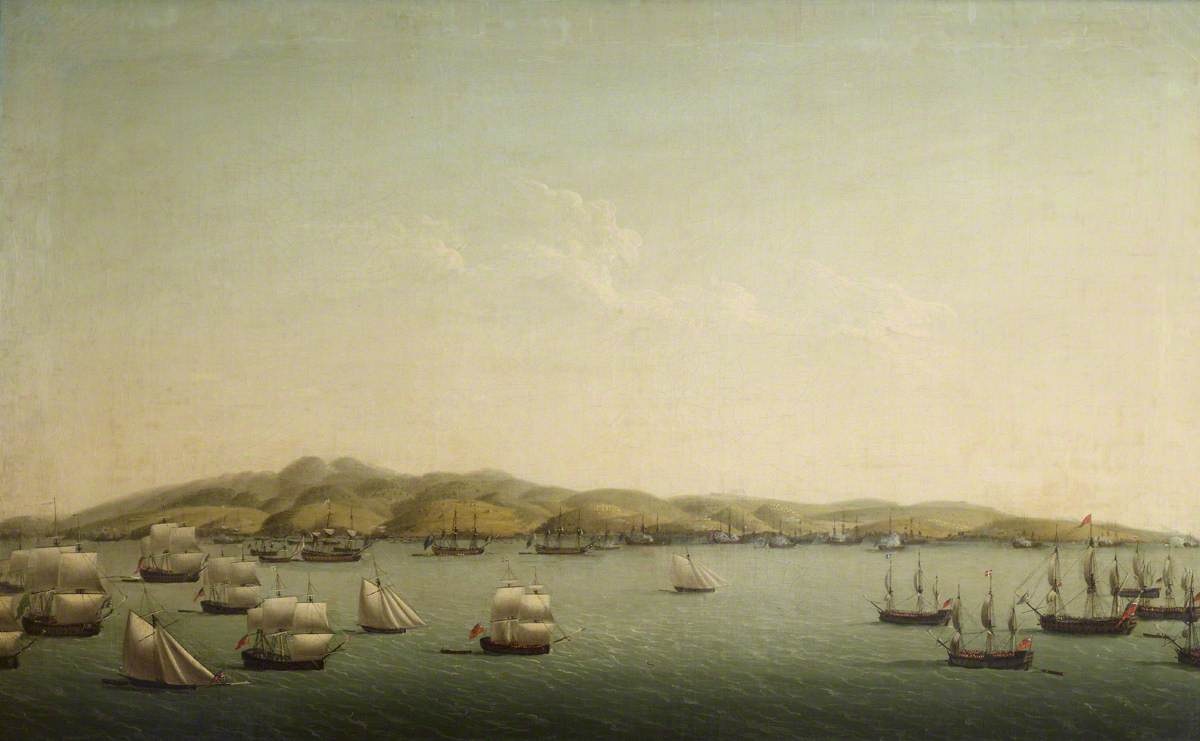
Rodney's Fleet Bombarding Martinique, 16 February 1762 by Dominic Serres

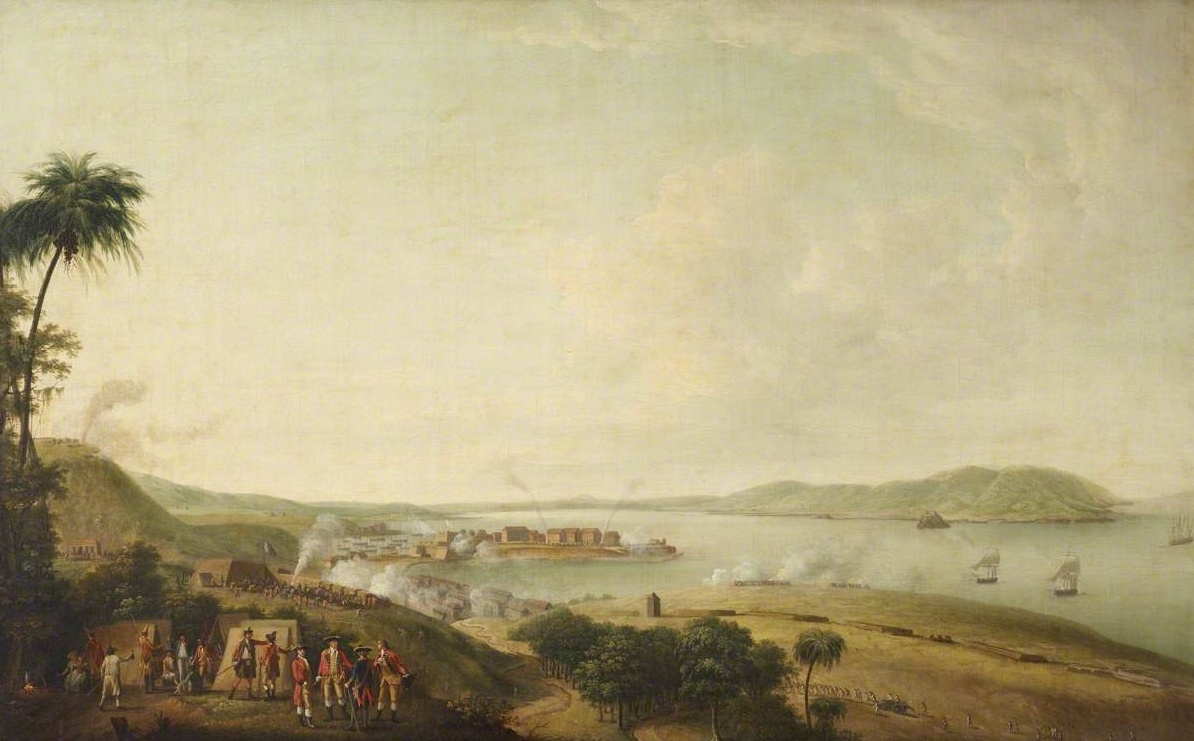
British Attack on the Citadel of Martinique, January 1762 also by Serres

== Aftermath ==
From 26 February to 3 March, Monckton sent detachments to the islands Saint Lucia, Grenada and Saint Vincent, all of which fell without resistance. Monckton had already made arrangements for the capture of Tobago when he received orders requiring the presence of his troops for the attack on Havana, Cuba.

Martinique was returned to France after the 1763 Treaty of Paris.

== See also ==
- France in the Seven Years War
- Great Britain in the Seven Years War

== Sources ==
- British expedition against Martinique

This article was originally based on material from , which is licensed under the GFDL.
