= New York Executive Council =

Upper house of province of New York

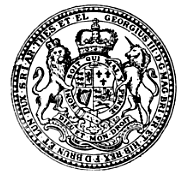

Type
- Type: Upper house
- Term limits: None

History
- Founded: October 17, 1683
- Disbanded: April 3, 1775
- Succeeded by: New York Provincial Congress

Leadership
- Speaker of the Executive Council

Structure
- Seats: 12
- Authority: Charter of Liberties and Privileges

The New York Executive Council (also known as the King's Council or Governor's Council), was the upper house of the supreme legislative body of the Province of New York during its period of proprietal colonialship while it was a crown colony. It was in effect until April 3, 1775, when the government disbanded after the outbreak of the Revolutionary War.

== History ==
The Governor's Council was first convened in 1683 during the governorship of Thomas Dongan, 2nd Earl of Limerick, which passed an act entitled "A Charter of Liberties" that decreed that the supreme legislative power under the Duke of York (later King James II) shall reside in a governor, council, and the people convened in general assembly.

The council, when full, consisted of twelve members, who were appointed by the King, and who enjoyed the same authority as the lords in parliament. Together with the governor, the council had an unqualified veto upon the acts of the general assembly. They acted as a privy council to the governor in matters of civil government, and held their office at the will of the Crown. Privy councils were held at the fort in New-York, at which the governor was always present, but their legislative sessions were held without his presence, at the city hall. The senior member was speaker of their house; their proceedings were not published, (Note: The Council minutes in the secretary's office, while not published, which filled 33 manuscript volumes.) and in their formalities they closely imitated the English House of Lords. Messages to the assembly were carried by one of their members, and the house always arose at his entrance and received him standing. Councilors received no salary. The council exercised judicial authority upon writs of error and appeal (which was composed of the Governor and the council).

From 1692 forward, the English Privy Council administered the Province of New York, appointed the royal officials (Governor, Lieutenant-Governor, Attorney-General and members of the Governor's Council) and served as the court of final appeal for the Province. In 1735, the New York Governor ceased to participate in Council meetings and from then on the Province's government took the familiar form of an executive (Governor), upper chamber (the Council) and lower chamber (the Assembly). Towards the close of the colonial period, "their duties had devolved upon a few, and were very great."

== Members of the council ==
- Anthony Brockholls (served as acting governor from 1681 to 1683 while president of the council)
- William "Tangier" Smith (member of the council from 1691 to 1705; served as acting governor in 1701)
- Pieter Schuyler (member of the council from 1692 to 1721; thrice served as acting governor)
- Adolphus Philipse (removed in 1721)
- Abraham de Peyster
- Cadwallader Colden (appointed in 1720)
- Archibald Kennedy (he became the 11th Earl of Cassilis in 1792)
- James Alexander (member of the council from 1721 to 1732; reappointed in 1737)
- James De Lancey (appointed in 1730; served as acting governor from 1753 to 1755 and from 1758 to 1760)
- Daniel Horsmanden (member of the council from 1733 to 1747 and from 1755 to 1776)
- George Clarke Jr. (acting governor from 1736 to 1743)
- Joseph Murray
- John Rutherfurd
- Edward Holland (appointed in 1748)
- Sir William Johnson, 1st Baronet (appointed in 1750)
- John Chambers
- Joseph Reade (member of the council from 1761 to 1771)
- William Axtell

== See also ==
- Province of New York
- New York General Assembly
