= Ebenezer Wilson =

American politician

30th Mayor of New York City
- In office 1707–1710
- Preceded by: William Peartree
- Succeeded by: Jacobus Van Cortlandt

Personal details
- Born: Circa. 1650

Ebenezer Wilson was a merchant and the 30th Mayor of New York City from 1707 to 1709. He had originally served as Sheriff of New York from June 1702 to March 1707. He was elected to a two-year mayoral term on 10 October 1707. Under Wilson's administration, Water Street was extended from Old Slip to John Street and Broadway was paved from Trinity Church to Bowling Green.
