= William Peartree =

29th Mayor of New York City (~1643–1714)

29th Mayor of New York City
- In office 1703–1707
- Preceded by: Phillip French
- Succeeded by: Ebenezer Wilson

Personal details
- Born: c 1643
- Died: 1714 Bergen, New Jersey
- Spouse: Anna

William Peartree (c. 1643 – 1714) was the 29th Mayor of New York City from 1703 to 1707. He married Anna, daughter of Daniel Liczko (1615–1662) (a lieutenant of Peter Stuyvesant) and Annetje Croesen Litsco, who later for many years entertained at "Mother Litsco's Tavern" on lower Pearl Street near the Brooklyn ferry.

Peartree began his career as a planter in Jamaica in the Caribbean and, during King William's War (1688–169) with the Kingdom of France, had success as a privateer. After Port Royal, Jamaica sank into the sea in the earthquake of 1692, Peartree moved back to New York City much enriched from his depredation upon Spanish and French shipping. When Queen Anne's War began in 1702, William Peartree was elected mayor in 1703, as New Yorkers saw fit to elect an experienced naval captain to defend the town. He served as mayor until 1707 and died in 1714.

William Peartree's great-grandson, William Peartree Smith, was a founder of Princeton University.

Preceded by Phillip French	Mayor of New York City; 1703–1707	Succeeded by Ebenezer Wilson
