= Phillip French =

Politician

28th Mayor of New York City
- In office October 19, 1702 – October 1703
- Preceded by: Thomas Noell
- Succeeded by: William Peartree

Personal details
- Born: c. February 13, 1666/7 Suffolk, England
- Died: c. June 3, 1707 New York City, Province of New York, British America
- Resting place: Old Dutch Church of Sleepy Hollow
- Spouse: Annetje Philipse (after 1694)
- Relations: John French (brother); Frederick Philipse (father-in-law)
- Parent(s): Philip French; Elisabeth Crawling

Phillip French II (c. February 13, 1666/7 – c. June 3, 1707) was the 28th Mayor of New York City from 1702 to 1703.

== Early life ==
French was born in Suffolk, England, and was sometimes known as Philip French Van London. He was the son of Phillip French, a London merchant who owned property in Knodishall, and his first wife Elisabeth (née Crawley/Crawling) French. They married on 10 June 1661 at Saint Giles Cripplegate, City of London, Middlesex, England. His brother John French was mentioned in his 1706 will.

== Career ==
French first came to New York in 1686. He returned again in June 1689, and became a prosperous merchant, working with Frederick Philipse on behalf of his father. In politics, he was an active anti-Leislerian. He became was Speaker of the Assembly in 1698 and an Alderman in 1701. At the time, he leased the dock for £40 sterling.

On September 19, 1702, he was appointed the 28th Mayor of New York City. French served from October 19, 1702 to October 1703.

== Personal life ==
On July 8, 1694, French was married to Annetje "Anna" Philipse (b. 1667) at the Reformed Dutch Church in New York. She was the daughter of Margareta (née Hardenbroeck) Philipse and Frederick Philipse, the 1st Lord of Philipsburg Manor. Together, they were the parents of:

- Philip French III (1697–1782), who married Susanna Brockholst (1696–1730), the daughter of Anthony Brockholst, an acting Governor of Colonial New York under Sir Edmund Andros.
- Elizabeth French (c. 1700), who married Cornelius Van Horne, the son of Johannes Van Horne.
- Anne French (c. 1703), who married Joseph Reade (1694–1771), a second-generation English prominent merchant.
- Margareta French (c. 1705), who died unmarried.

He prepared a will, dated May 29, 1706, that was proven June 3, 1707.

=== Descendants ===
Through his son Philip, was the grandfather of Susannah French (1723–1789) who married William Livingston (1723–1790), a politician who served as the Governor of New Jersey (1776–1790) during the American Revolutionary War and was a signer of the United States Constitution.

Another granddaughter through Philip, Elisabeth French (1724–1808), was married to David Clarkson (1726–1782), and they were the parents of Matthew Clarkson (1758–1825), a colonial soldier and politician, and Thomas Streatfeild Clarkson, the grandfather of Thomas S. Clarkson, the namesake of Clarkson University.

== See also ==
- List of mayors of New York City
- Van Horne House – home of Cornelius Van Horne
