= Robert Monckton =

British Army officer, politician and colonial administrator

Lieutenant-General Robert Monckton
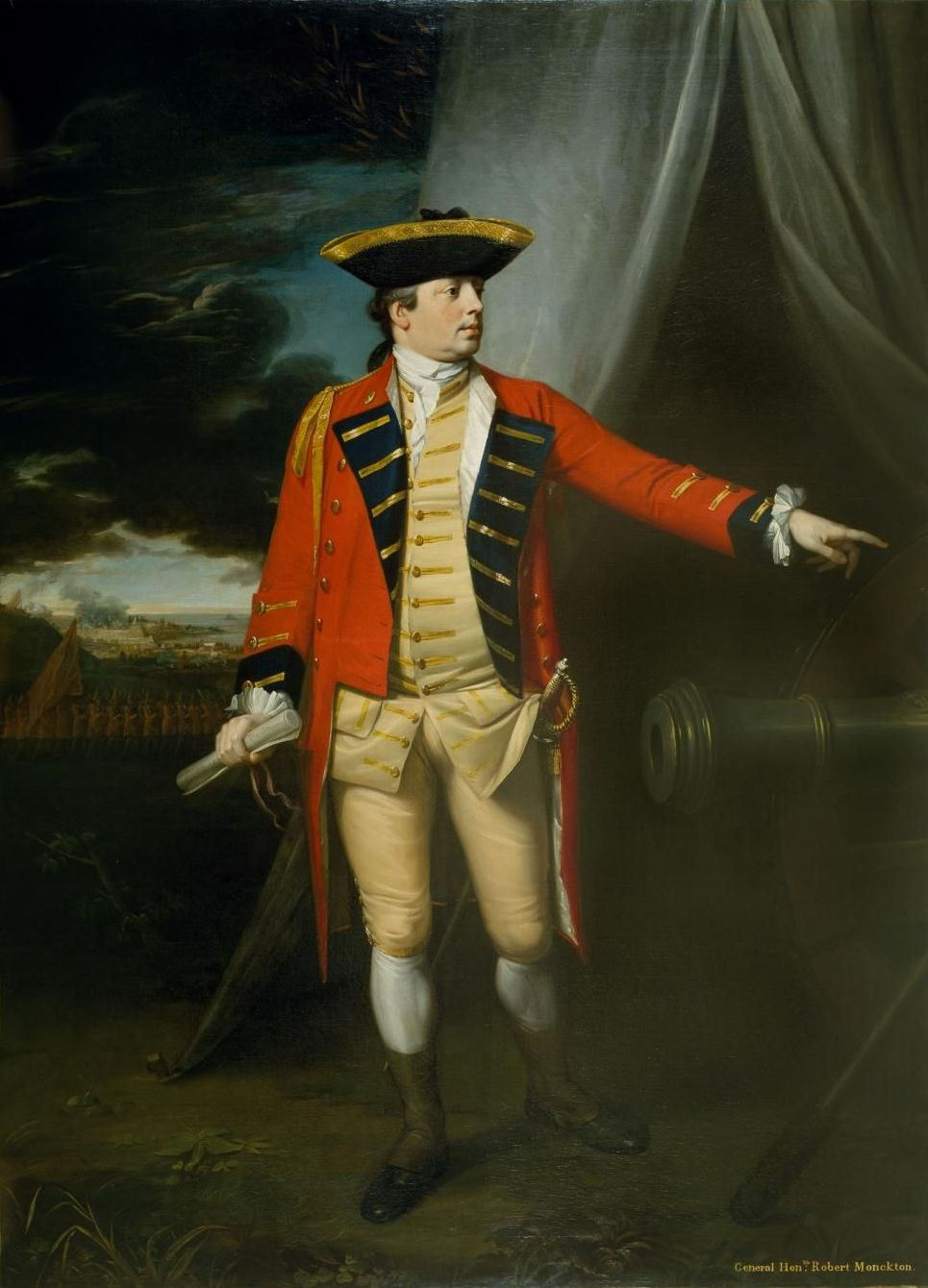
- Portrait of Robert Monckton by Benjamin West, 1763
- Born: 24 June 1726; Yorkshire, England
- Died: 21 May 1782 (aged 55)
- Military career
- Allegiance: Great Britain
- Branch: British Army
- Service years: 1741–1782
- Rank: Lieutenant-general
- Unit: 3rd Regiment of Foot Guards
- Commands: 47th Regiment of Foot; Commander of Fort Lawrence; Commander of British expeditionary force to Fort Beauséjour; Second in Command to General James Wolfe at Quebec; Commander of British forces in the southern provinces Commander of British forces capturing Martinique
- Conflicts: War of the Austrian Succession; Seven Years' War; Battle of Fort Beauséjour; Bay of Fundy Campaign; St. John River Campaign; Battle of Beauport; Battle of the Plains of Abraham; Capture of Martinique; American War of Independence; Armada of 1779
- Other work: MP for Pontefract; Lieut Governor of Nova Scotia; Governor of Province of New York; Governor of Berwick-upon-Tweed; Governor of Portsmouth; MP for Portsmouth

Lieutenant-General Robert Monckton (24 June 1726 – 21 May 1782) was a British Army officer, politician and colonial administrator. He had a distinguished military and political career, being second in command to General James Wolfe at the Battle of the Plains of Abraham and later being named the governor of New York. Monckton is also remembered for his role in a number of other important events in the French and Indian War, most notably the capture of Fort Beauséjour in Acadia, and the island of Martinique in the West Indies, as well as for his role in the expulsion of the Acadians from Nova Scotia and Acadia.

Monckton sat in the House of Commons of Great Britain between 1774 and 1782. Although never legally married, he had three sons and a daughter. The city of Moncton, New Brunswick (about 50 kilometres (31 mi) west of Fort Beauséjour) and Fort Monckton in Port Elgin, New Brunswick are named for him. A second more important Fort Monckton in Gosport, England is also named for him. It remains an active military establishment, and currently houses the training section of MI6.

== Early life ==
Arms of Robert Monckton

Robert Monckton was the second son of Elizabeth Manners and John Monckton (later the first Viscount Galway) and, like many second sons of British aristocrats, he entered military service. In 1741, at the age of 15, he secured a commission in the 3rd Regiment of Foot Guards. He saw action in the War of the Austrian Succession, later staying on in Flanders after the bulk of the British Army had been recalled in 1745 to deal with the Jacobite Rebellion. He rose rapidly through the ranks, eventually becoming lieutenant colonel in command of the 47th Foot in early 1752.

Monckton's father died later that year and he thus inherited control of the parliamentary borough of Pontefract and had himself elected to the House of Commons. However, he resigned his parliamentary seat within less than a year, after receiving a military posting (with the 47th Foot) to Nova Scotia as commanding officer of Fort Lawrence, which was located on the frontier with Acadia, facing Fort Beauséjour across the Missaguash River. Monckton stayed in this posting for less than a year (August 1752 - June 1753). The frontier between Nova Scotia and Acadia was calm during this time. Monckton and the French commander of Fort Beauséjour exchanged notes, deserters, and runaway horses during this time, but intelligence was also gathered that would prove valuable to him during subsequent events.

Monckton was called to Halifax in 1753 to preside over a court martial, but was asked to stay on as a member of the colonial council. Later in 1753, he deftly handled a minor uprising by German settlers (the Hoffman Insurrection) near Lunenburg, Nova Scotia. Monckton investigated thoroughly and found the source of the conflict between the German settlers and the colonial authorities to be a simple misunderstanding, and advocated forgiveness for the rebellious settlers. However, Monckton's superior, Lieutenant Governor Charles Lawrence, was less inclined to forgiveness, warning Monckton "....tho the merciful part is always the most agreable (particularly with Foreigners unacquainted with our laws and Customs) in disturbances of this nature, yet it is seldom the most effectual". This conflict between Monckton's decency and humanity and Lawrence's intransigence and cruelty would be revisited on subsequent occasions.

== French and Indian War ==
In the winter of 1754, Governor Charles Lawrence of Nova Scotia and Massachusetts Governor William Shirley, under a general British directive, made plans to deal with French "encroachments" on the frontier of the British North American colonies. This process ultimately led to the beginning of the final French and Indian War and the onset of the Seven Years' War in North America. One of the first actions of this war was to be at Fort Beauséjour and Robert Monckton, with his intimate knowledge of the terrain and the local fortifications, was invited to spend the winter in Boston to assist in the planning process.

=== Fort Beauséjour ===
See main article at Battle of Fort Beauséjour

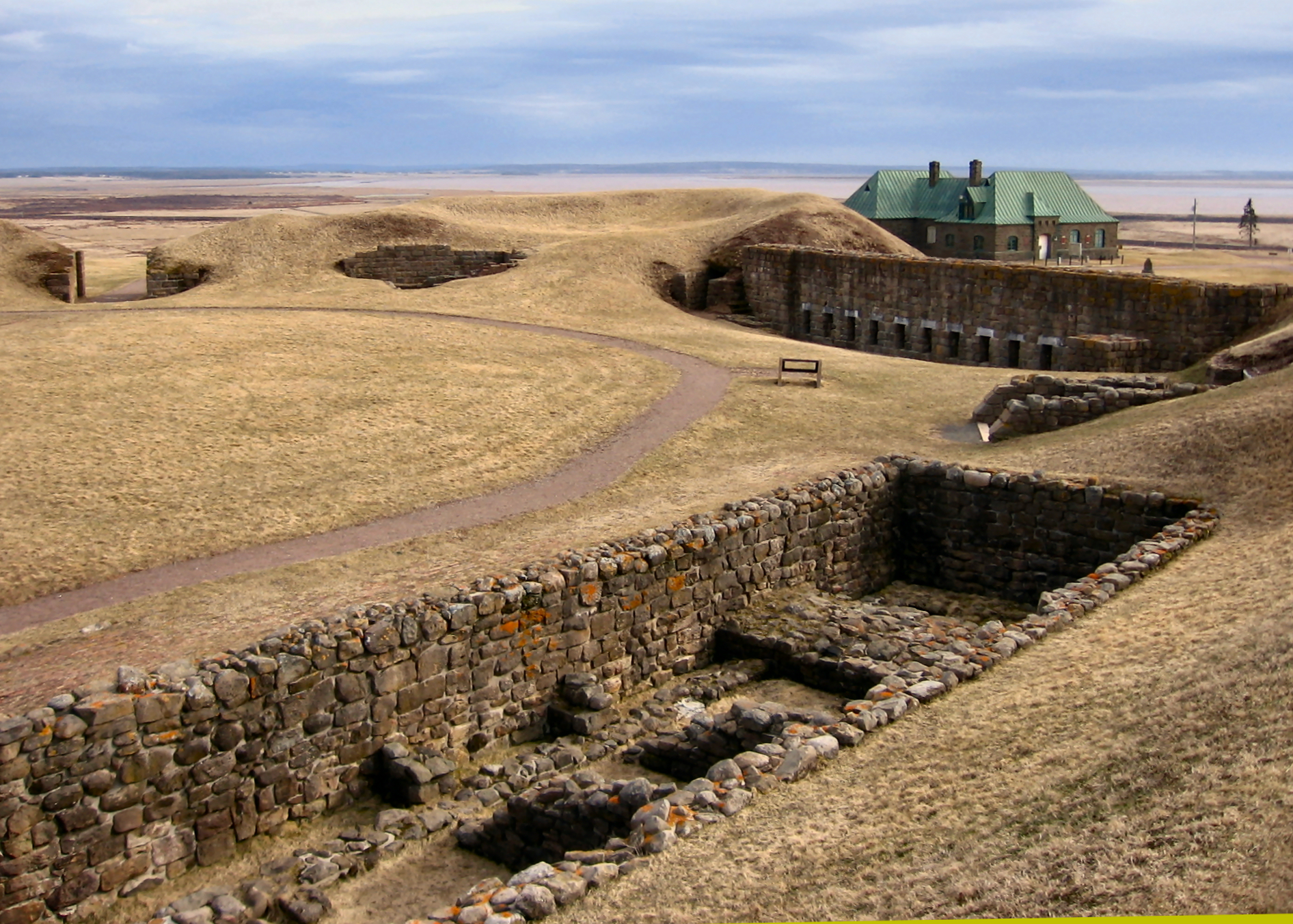
View of Fort Beauséjour showing the foundation of the Officers Quarters in the foreground, the modern (1930s)museum in the middle ground, and Cumberland Basin in the background. Monckton approached the fort from Aulac Ridge, which would be behind the observer.

In June 1755, Monckton, commanding a fleet of 31 transports and three warships carrying 270 British regular troops and 2,000 New England militia, entered Cumberland Basin. The ships dropped anchor at the mouth of the Missaguash River and the British forces were able to land unopposed. Using Fort Lawrence as a staging area, Monckton quickly surrounded Fort Beauséjour and began a careful advancement on the fort from the north by moving along the top of Aulac Ridge. A two-week siege ensued. During this time sappers were used to dig zig-zag offensive trenches until they were close enough to the fort to allow for bombardment by 13-inch mortars. The French commander of the fort, Louis Du Pont Duchambon de Vergor, being outnumbered more than four to one, realised that his position was untenable. Morale in the fort deteriorated considerably once word was received that reinforcements would not be arriving from Fortress Louisbourg. Desertions within the Acadian irregular ranks became a major problem. After one of the British mortar rounds hit the officers mess killing several French soldiers, Vergor decided to capitulate. The British forces then occupied the fort and renamed it Fort Cumberland (after the Duke of Cumberland). Following the capitulation, Monckton treated the defeated French generously and offered the garrison passage to Fortress Louisbourg. He also pardoned the Acadian irregulars. The French commander of Fort Gaspareaux, on the opposite side of the Isthmus of Chignecto, was offered (and subsequently agreed to) the same terms on the following day, thus securing the frontier of Nova Scotia. Fort Gaspareaux was subsequently renamed Fort Monckton.

=== Acadian deportation ===
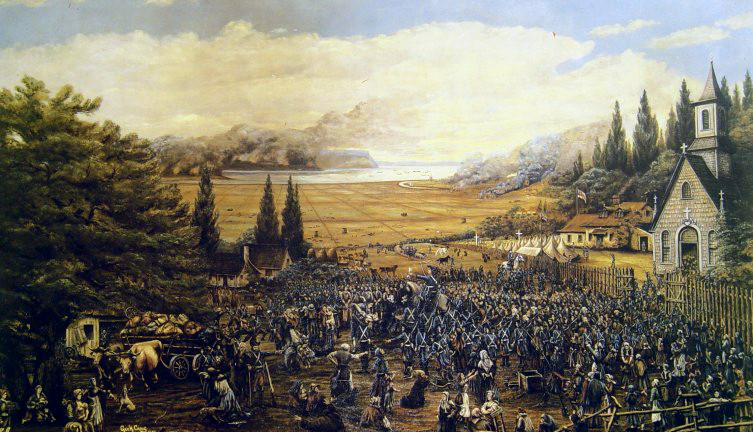
Grand Pré: Deportation of the Acadians during the Bay of Fundy Campaign (1755)

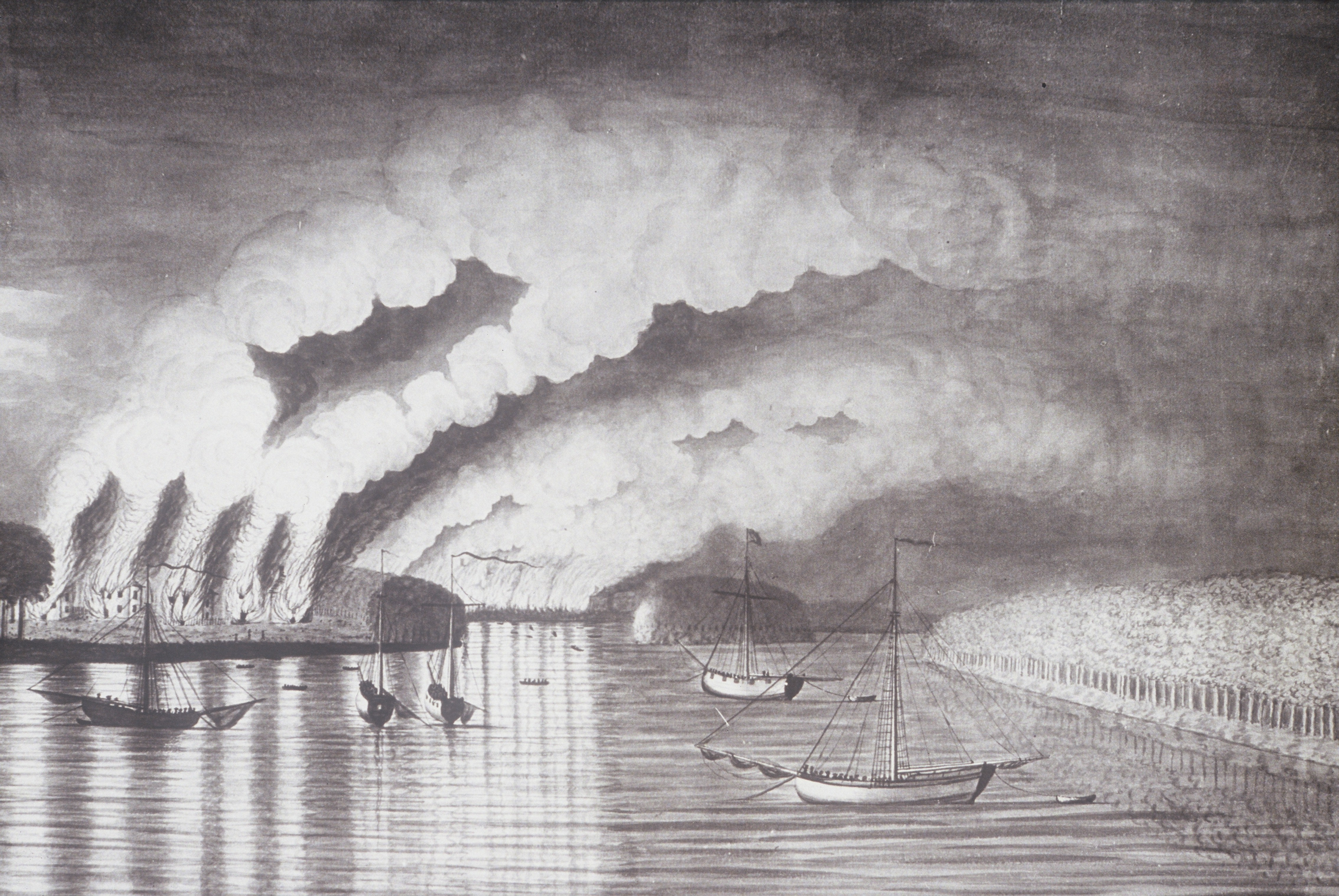
St. John River Campaign: A View of the Plundering and Burning of the City of Grimross (present day Arcadia, New Brunswick) by Thomas Davies in 1758. This is the only contemporaneous image of the Expulsion of the Acadians.

Following the capture of Fort Beauséjour, Governor Lawrence and the Nova Scotia Council decided that the presence of Acadian irregulars helping in the defence of the fort constituted a "violation" of Acadian neutrality. This of course ignored the fact that the vast majority of the Acadians in the fort were from French controlled Acadia and not from British controlled Nova Scotia. Nevertheless, he used this as a pretext to force the Acadian inhabitants of Nova Scotia to swear an unqualified oath of allegiance to the British crown; something that the Acadian population of Nova Scotia had been successfully able to avoid for 40 years. The Acadians again refused to comply. The die was thus cast and Lawrence, emboldened by the size of Monckton's expeditionary force subsequently issued the order to expel the Acadian population from the region. This decision was heavily influenced by the recent conflicts between the British colonial authorities and the Acadians in Nova Scotia during Father Le Loutre's War. Lawrence's ordering of the deportation of the Acadians from Nova Scotia resulted in their dispersal to the other British North American colonies, as well as to Louisiana and to France. On 10 August 1755, Lt. Colonel Monckton, "with characteristic efficiency but no apparent enthusiasm", carried out his orders (from Lawrence) to lure 400 Acadian men (whom he had originally pardoned) and imprisoned them at Fort Cumberland to await deportation. Over the course of the next several months, the deportation effort spread to other French settlements on the Bay of Fundy and ultimately over 7,000 Acadian men, women and children were forced from their homes.

Monckton was named Lieutenant Governor of Nova Scotia later in 1755. He served in this capacity for three years; twice as acting Governor of the colony. Because of these administrative duties, he could not participate in the fall of Fortress Louisbourg in 1758, but later that same year, the now Colonel Monckton did lead a force of 2,000 men in the clearance of Acadian resistance (and the removal of the Acadian civilian population) from the lower Saint John River valley during the St. John River Campaign. This was the final act of the deportation drama. Following this action, all of Acadia came under British control.

=== The Plains of Abraham ===
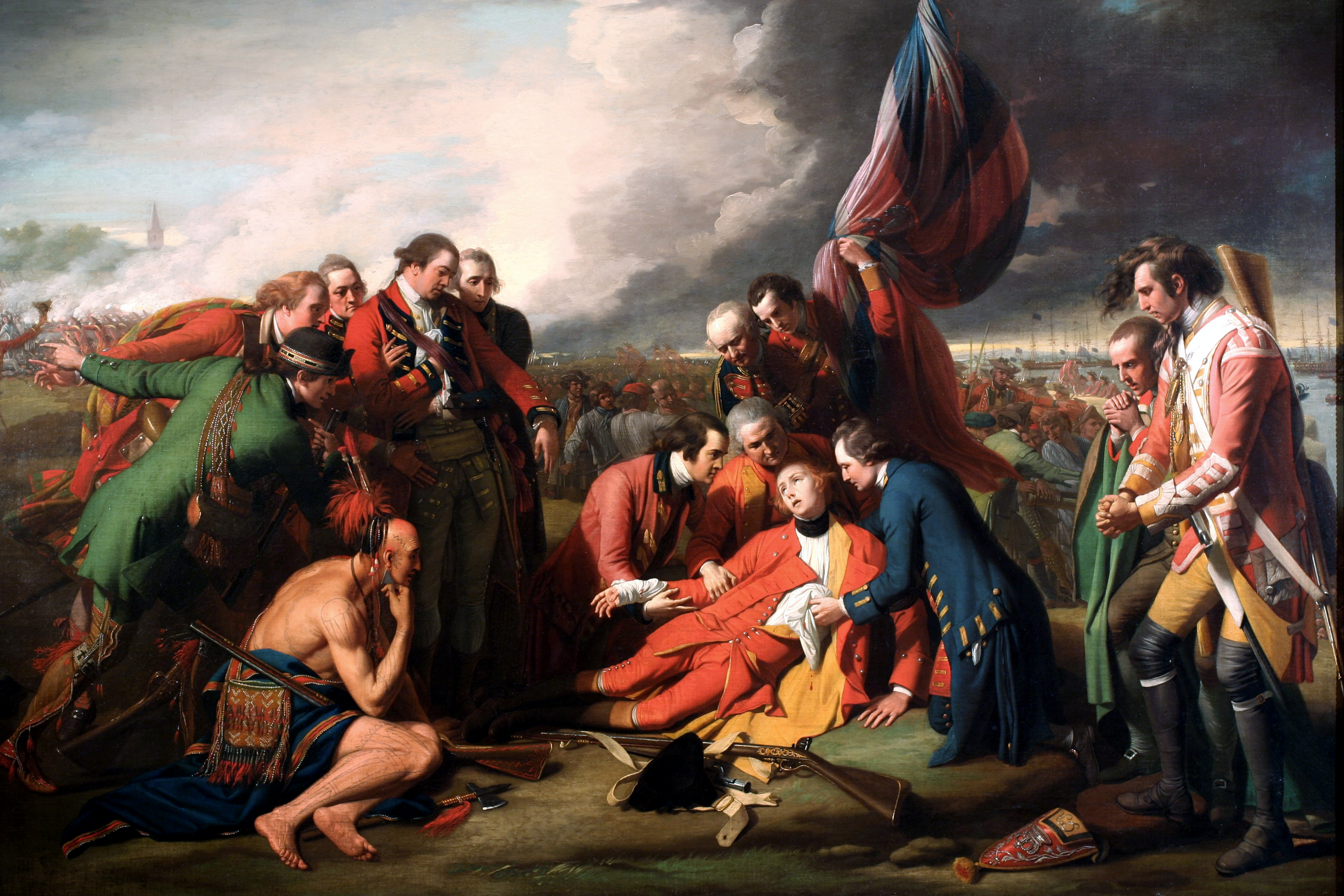
The Death of General Wolfe by Benjamin West. Brigadier Robert Monckton is pictured standing to the left of General Wolfe and is illustrated holding his hand over his wounded chest.

Early in 1759, General James Wolfe chose Monckton to be his second in command for the assault on Quebec. Monckton's role in the siege and later the capture of Quebec was considerable. Monckton established control of the south shore of the St. Lawrence River facing Quebec and was placed in charge of the artillery batteries trained on Quebec from Lévis. Monckton later commanded the 47th Foot on the British right flank during the Battle of Beauport on 31 July.

As the siege wore on, General Wolfe and his three brigadiers came to dislike each other and disagreed as to how to conduct the battle plan. Monckton and the other two brigadiers, George Townshend and James Murray recommended a stealthy advance on Quebec from the west rather than another frontal attack on the Beauport shore. Wolfe eventually was swayed by their argument but instead of landing at Cap Rouge (as they recommended), Wolfe instead chose to land at Anse au Foulon, where a narrow path led to the top of the bluff. Landing here would allow the British to gain direct access to the Plains of Abraham, only a short distance from the walls of Quebec. The landing (under Monckton's direction) was carried out at dawn on the morning of 13 September. Ironically, the French commander in charge of the encampment at the top of the bluff, and the first to encounter the English forces, was again the hapless de Vergor. The French encampment was quickly overrun and de Vergor shot and captured.

The Plains of Abraham were quickly gained and the British forces marshalled into fighting ranks. The French commander of Quebec, Louis Joseph de Montcalm decided to directly engage the British forces on the field. In the ensuing battle, Monckton again commanded the British right flank and was wounded in the chest. This prevented him from being present at the surrender of Quebec and, with Wolfe's death during the battle, it was Brigadier George Townshend that received the French capitulation. Monckton resented this and, although severely wounded, he roused whatever strength he had to assume command of the defeated city. Monckton commanded Quebec for a month following the capitulation and demonstrated considerable concern for (and leniency with) the conquered civilian population. This was a strategically wise decision, as winter was approaching and the occupying British forces needed the goodwill of the civilian population in order to survive the season.

Monckton was relieved of his duties at Quebec on 26 October 1759 and was reassigned to New York for convalescence. He eventually recovered from his wound and, in 1760, was appointed Colonel of the 17th Regiment of Foot and commander of the British forces in the southern provinces (the provinces south of New York). Here, Monckton was charged with consolidating control of the area around Fort Pitt, as well as the Niagara region and the old French fortifications in the Alleghenies. In 1761, Monckton was promoted to the rank of major-general.

=== Capture of Martinique ===
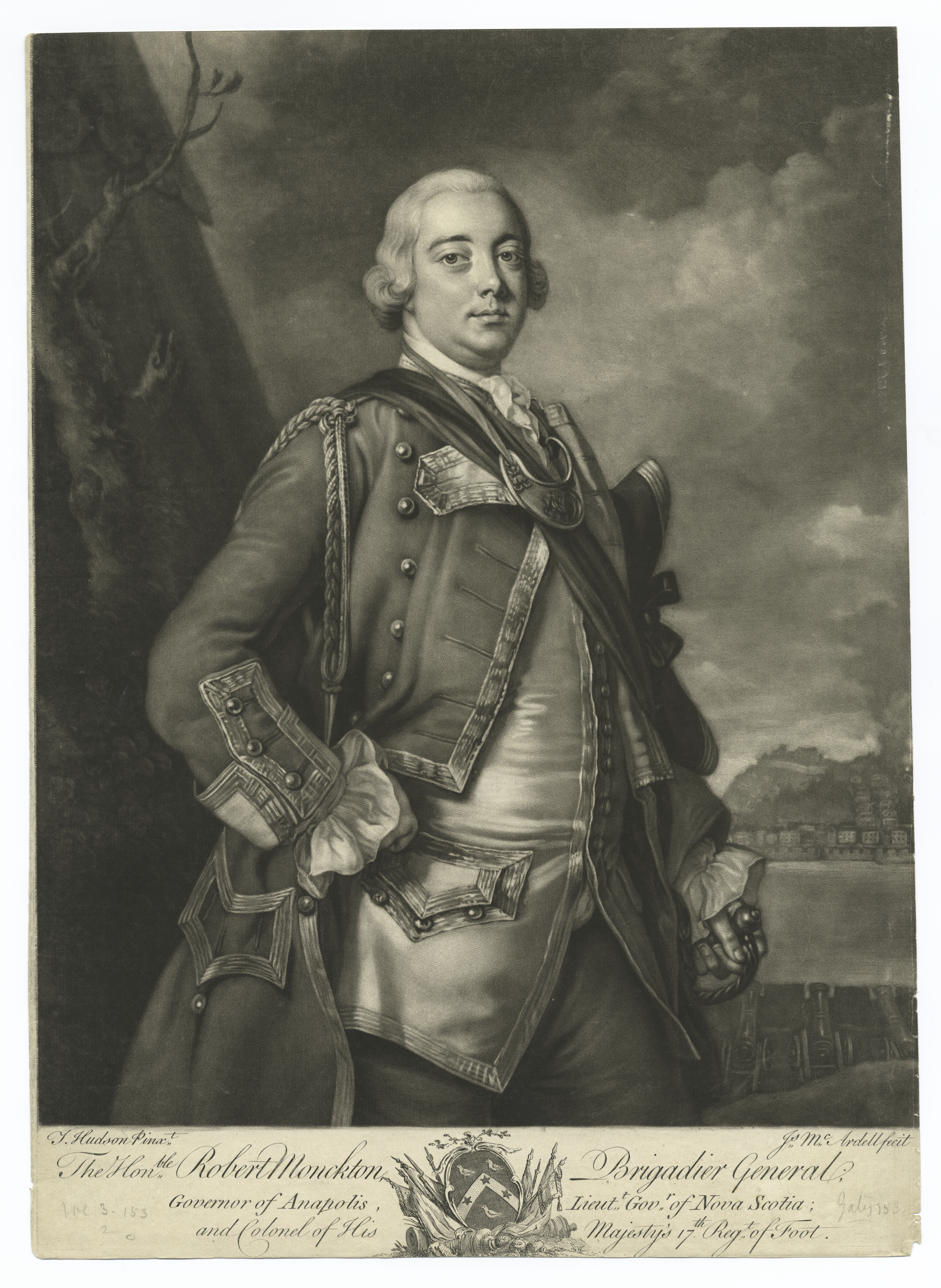
An engraving based a portrait of Monckton by Thomas Hudson

In 1762, Monckton was given the command by Jeffrey Amherst of the British expeditionary force against Martinique. The British invasion force consisted of approximately 8,000 men and with Admiral Rodney sailed from Barbados on 5 January, arriving off Martinique on 7 January. The forces landed unopposed on 16 January, near the southern tip of the island about 5 km from the principal town of Fort Royal (Fort-de-France). Monckton patiently constructed batteries for the subsequent offensive, which was not launched until 24 January. Under covering cannon fire, heavy fighting ensued on steep and uneven terrain especially around the high ground of Morne Grenier. By 28 January, Monckton's lines were secure and he had established firing positions overlooking Fort Royal. The town surrendered on 3 February and the remainder of the island was secured by 12 February. The terms of capitulation of the island, modelled on the surrender of Guadeloupe in 1759 with only a few minor changes, suggest that Monckton was a skilful and well-informed negotiator. From 26 February – 3 March, Monckton shipped off detachments to Saint Lucia, Grenada and Saint Vincent, all of which fell without resistance. Monckton had already made his arrangements for the capture of Tobago when he received orders requiring the presence of his troops for the attack on Havana, Cuba.

The capture of Martinique by Monckton was of tremendous strategic importance to the British war effort as it gave the British a very valuable bargaining chip in the subsequent peace negotiations. The French much desired the return of this valuable island and its sugar plantations. At the Treaty of Paris, which ended the Seven Years' War, the French willingly bargained away Canada and Acadia in return for Martinique. Voltaire at the time, famously stated that Canada was nothing more than "a few acres of snow". The capture of Martinique thus helped to disproportionately influence the course of history in North America.

== Later life ==
Monckton returned from the Caribbean later in 1762. In 1763 he sat to the American artist Benjamin West for Portrait of Robert Monckton, a work that helped launch West's career in Britain when he exhibited it at the Society of Artists. Monckton was subsequently named Governor of the Province of New York. He held this position until 1765, even though he left North America for good in 1763 to return to England. In 1765 Monckton was appointed governor of Berwick-upon-Tweed. In 1770 he was promoted to the rank of lieutenant-general. Later, Monckton became interested in becoming the British military commander of India and although he had the East India Company nomination and some royal support, he was not offered the position. Instead, he was offered the command of the British army in North America which he declined. In 1778 he became governor of Portsmouth and MP for the town in the Admiralty interest. Also that year, his younger brother, Henry Monckton was killed while leading the grenadiers at the Battle of Monmouth in New Jersey during the evacuation of Philadelphia. The following year, Robert Monckton organised Portsmouth's defences against the Armada of 1779 (during the American War of Independence). As part of his duties, he initiated construction of a fort overlooking Portsmouth Harbour, which would later be named in his honour after his death. Fort Monckton remains an active military establishment and currently is the home of the training section of the British Secret Intelligence Service (MI6). Monckton died on 21 May 1782 at age 55 and is buried in St. Mary Abbot's Church, Kensington, London.

== Legacy ==
The city of Moncton, New Brunswick (near Fort Beauséjour) is named for him. As of 2016, the population of Metro Moncton (Moncton, Dieppe, and Riverview) is 144,810.

Monckton, however, remains somewhat of a controversial historical figure. He is generally reviled by the Acadian population of the Maritimes for his role in the deportation, but for the most part, Monckton was merely a subordinate following Governor Lawrence's directives. Aside from the deportation debacle, Monckton can be considered as one of the more skilled British commanders during the Seven Years' War and as a competent administrator.

Writing in 1884 about the later assessments of the historical event, noted 19th-century historian Francis Parkman concludes, "New England humanitarianism [and by implication, like-minded others to follow], melting into sentimentality at a tale of woe, has been unjust to its own. Whatever judgment may be passed on the cruel measure of wholesale expatriation, it was not put in execution till every resource of patience and persuasion had been tried in vain."

As an example of the mixed emotions surrounding Monckton's legacy, "The Un-Canadians", a 2007 article in Beaver Magazine, includes Robert Monckton in a list of people in the history of Canada who in the opinion of the authors were contemptible: "Lieutenant-General Robert Monckton, a colonial administrator in British North America, implemented the exile of the Acadians in 1755."

== See also ==
- Military history of Nova Scotia

Parliament of Great Britain
Preceded by Viscount Galway; Henry Strachey	Member of Parliament for Pontefract; March 1774 – October 1774; With: Henry Strachey	Succeeded by Sir John Goodricke, Bt; Charles Mellish
Preceded by Maurice Suckling; William Gordon	Member of Parliament for Portsmouth; 1778–1782; With: William Gordon	Succeeded by Sir Henry Fetherstonhaugh, Bt; William Gordon
Government offices
Preceded by Cadwallader Colden (acting)	Governor of the Province of New York; 1762–1763	Succeeded by Cadwallader Colden (acting)
Preceded by John Guise	Governor of Berwick-upon-Tweed; 1765–1778	Succeeded by Sir John Clavering
Preceded by Edward Harvey	Governor of Portsmouth; 1778–1782	Succeeded by The Earl of Pembroke
Military offices
Preceded by John Forbes	Colonel of 17th Regiment of Foot; 1759–1782	Succeeded by George Morrison
