= 90th Regiment of Foot (1759) =

- Active: 1759–1763
- Country: Kingdom of Great Britain (1707–1800)
- Branch: British Army
- Type: Infantry

The 90th Regiment of Foot was a short-lived infantry regiment in the British Army which was raised in Ireland as a light infantry corps in 1759, during the Seven Years' War with France.

In 1761 the regiment was posted to Belle Isle off the coast of northern France, transferring in 1762 to the West Indies and in 1763 to Cuba. Following the Treaty of Paris in 1763 it returned to England, where it was disbanded the same year.

The Colonel-Commandants of the Regiment were Lt-Col. Hugh Morgan (1759–62) and Lt-Col. Francis Grant (1762–63). The regiment had no battle honours.
