= New York Conspiracy of 1741 =

Alleged plot by poor whites and slaves to overthrow New York's colonial government

- Part of the Slave Revolts in North America
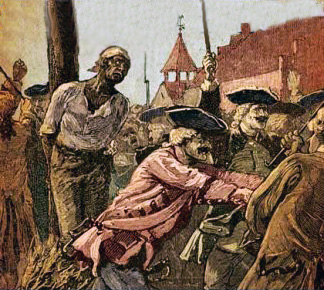
- Slave being burnt at the stake for allegedly participating in the uprising
- Date: 1741
- Location: New York City, Province of New York
- Goals: Destruction of New York City (alleged)
- Result: Hundreds arrested, over 100 hanged, burned at the stake, or exiled

Parties
Slaves, poor whites	Province of New York

Lead figures
(Alleged); Caesar (executed); John Hughson (executed); John Ury (executed)	

Casualties and losses
34 executed, 84 transported to Caribbean slavery, 7 exiled	None

Outcome
- Effects: Introduction of new laws to control the enslaved population

The Conspiracy of 1741, also known as the Slave Insurrection of 1741, was a purported plot by slaves and poor whites in the British colony of New York in 1741 to revolt and level New York City with a series of fires. Historians disagree as to whether such a plot existed and, if there was one, its scale. During the court cases, the prosecution kept changing the grounds of accusation, ending with linking the insurrection to a "Popish" plot by Spaniards and other Catholics.

In 1741, Manhattan had the second-largest slave population of any city in the Thirteen Colonies after Charleston, South Carolina. Rumors of a conspiracy arose against a background of economic competition between poor whites and slaves; a severe winter; war between Britain and Spain, with heightened anti-Catholic and anti-Spanish feelings; and recent slave revolts in South Carolina and Saint John in the Caribbean. In March and April 1741, a series of 13 fires erupted in Lower Manhattan, the most significant one within the walls of Fort George, then the home of the governor. After another fire at a warehouse, a slave was arrested after having been seen fleeing it. A 16-year-old Irish indentured servant, Mary Burton, arrested in a case of stolen goods, testified against the others as participants in a supposedly growing conspiracy of poor whites and blacks to burn the city, kill the white men, take the white women for themselves, and elect a new king and governor.

In the spring of 1741, fear gripped Manhattan as fires burned across all the inhabited areas of the island. The suspected culprits included hundreds of New York's slaves, free blacks, and lower-class whites, 172 of whom were arrested and tried for conspiracy to burn the town and murder its white inhabitants. As in the Salem witch trials, a few witnesses implicated many other suspects. In the end, thirty-four people were executed, thirty of whom were black men. They included seventeen black men, two white men, and two white women who were hanged as well as thirteen black men burnt at the stake. The bodies of two supposed ringleaders, Caesar, a slave, and John Hughson, a white cobbler and tavern keeper, were gibbeted. Their corpses were left to rot in public. Another eighty-four men and women faced transportation to the brutal conditions of Caribbean slavery while seven white men were pardoned on condition of entering permanent exile from New York.

== Background ==
With the increase of enslaved Africans in New York during the early decades of the 18th century, there were both real revolts and periodic fears in the white community about revolts. Fears about slavery were used by different political factions to fan other tensions, as well. By 1741, enslaved people comprised one in five of New York's total population of 10,000; it was the second-largest enslaved population of any city in British North America after that of Charleston, South Carolina. Between 1687 and 1741, a slave plot was "discovered" on average every two and one half years. Some residents remembered the New York Slave Revolt of 1712, when more than 20 slaves met to destroy property and abusers in retaliation for the injustices they had suffered.

With the increase of enslaved people in New York, poor whites had to compete economically. Some slaveholders were artisans who taught their slaves their trade. They could subcontract their work and underbid other white artisans. This created racial and economic tension between the enslaved and competing white craftsmen. The governor of New York in 1737 told the legislature, "the artificers complain and with too much reason of the pernicious custom of breeding slaves to trades whereby the honest industrious tradesmen are reduced to poverty for want of employ, and many of them forced to leave us to seek their living in other countries." Some whites went out of business because of this.

The winter of 1740–1741 was a miserable period for the poor in the city. An economic depression contributed to declining food and fuel supply, aggravated by record low temperatures and snowfall. Many people were in danger of starving and freezing to death. These conditions caused many denizens, especially the poor whites and slaves, to grow resentful of the government. The tension between whites and blacks was great. "A mere hint of restiveness among black New Yorkers could throw whites into a near panic".

In addition, Britain experienced increased hostilities with Spain, which added to the anti-Catholic and anti-Spanish feelings by the authorities. In 1691 the British Crown ordered all New York officials to swear oaths under the Test Act. These oaths consisted of a series of declarations against the authority of the Catholic Church and its religious practices. All potential officeholders were obliged to swear that they had not received privilege from the Pope. As tensions between England and Spain escalated, the Test Act was determined to be too lenient for Catholics. By 1700 the New York anti-priest law utterly outlawed the presence of Catholic priests under penalty of life imprisonment.

In 1739, war broke out between the English and Spanish. The War of Jenkins' Ear, which lasted from 1739 until 1748, was initiated after Spanish coast guards unlawfully boarded the ship of Robert Jenkins, a British merchant, and severed his ear. This incidence was particularly notable because the 1713 Treaty of Utrecht gave the British a thirty-year right to supply an unlimited number of slaves to Spanish colonies with an additional 500 tons of goods each year. At the time, Spain was frequently viewed by slaves in Anglophone colonies as a liberator due to the fact the Spanish had offered freedom to any slave who joined their cause.

To attack Cuba, the British recruited soldiers from New York, and reduced the number of troops normally kept there. The upper classes were nervous and tensions during the winter reminded them of the times of the Slave Revolt of 1712. The government banned slave meetings on street corners. They limited slaves in groups to three, but allowed twelve at funerals. The government reduced other rights of assembly and movement.

== Working-class conspiracy ==
Initially tackling the problem of stolen goods and Hughson's tavern, the city council decided to launch an investigation. They turned it over to Daniel Horsmanden, the city recorder and one of three justices on the provincial supreme court. Horsmanden set up a grand jury that he "directed to investigate whites who sold liquor to blacks – men like John Hughson." Given legal practice then and his own inclinations, he exercised great influence in interrogations and directing the grand jury's investigations.

John Hughson was a poor, illiterate cobbler who came to New York from Yonkers in the mid-1730s with his wife, daughter, and mother-in-law. Unable to find work, he opened a tavern. His neighbors were offended because he sold to clients they considered unsavory. In 1738, Hughson opened a new tavern when he moved to the Hudson River waterfront, near the Trinity Churchyard. It soon became a rendezvous point for slaves, poor whites, free blacks, and soldiers. The elite were nervous about such lower-class types socializing together. Hughson's place also was a center of trade in stolen property. "City slaves laughingly referred to his place as 'Oswego', after the Indian trading post on Lake Ontario." Although the constables watched his place constantly, they failed to catch Hughson for thievery. In February, two weeks before the first fire, Hughson was arrested for receiving stolen goods from slaves Caesar and Prince, who were also jailed. Caesar, Prince, and Cuffee were considered part of the "Geneva Club", named after an incident in which they stole some "Geneva", or Dutch gin. (The slaves were punished by whipping.)

Horsmanden, one of three justices on the court and leader of an investigation, pressured 16-year-old indentured servant, Mary Burton, to testify against her master Hughson on theft charges. While a grand jury heard that case, the first of 13 suspicious fires broke out.

== Fires ==
On March 18, 1741, Governor George Clarke's house in Fort George caught fire, and soon the church connected to his house was ablaze too. People tried to save it, but the fire soon grew beyond control. The fire threatened to spread to another building, where all the city documents were kept. The governor ordered the windows smashed and documents thrown out to save them. Later the practice was to keep them in the City Hall. A week later another fire broke out, but was put out quickly. The same thing happened the next week at a warehouse. Three days later a fire broke out in a cow stable. On the next day a person walking past a wealthy neighborhood saw coals by the hay in a stable and put them out, saving the neighborhood.

As the number of fires increased, so did the suspicion that the fires were not accidents but planned arson. When on April 6, a round of four fires broke out, and a black man was spotted running away, a white man yelled out, "A negro, a negro." The man's cry was taken up quickly by a crowd and soon turned to, "The negroes are rising!" They captured the running slave, Cuffee. He was jailed. Within a few days, 100 slaves were jailed.

Horsmanden put a lot of pressure on Burton to talk about the fires. Finally, Burton said the fires were a conspiracy between blacks and poor whites to burn down the town. Horsmanden was pleased with her testimony but was convinced that Burton knew more about the conspiracy than she had told him. He threatened to throw her in jail if she did not tell him more, so she testified further. There was rising fear about slaves and poor whites' combining for insurrection. Burton swore the three members of the Geneva Club met frequently at Hughson's home, had talked about burning the fort and town, and the Hughsons had agreed to help them. Another person suspected in the fires was "Margaret Sorubiero, alias Salingburgh, alias Kerry, commonly called Peggy", or the "Newfoundland Irish" beauty. She was a prostitute who serviced blacks. The room she lived in was paid for by Caesar, with whom she had a child.

Although Burton's testimony did not prove that any crime had been committed, the grand jury was so afraid that more fires would occur that they decided to believe her. The board of inquiry requested the lieutenant-governor to issue a proclamation offering a reward to anyone providing information leading to the conviction of anyone setting fire to any dwelling or storehouse in the city: £100 to a white person, £45 to a free black or Indian, and £20 and freedom to a slave. Such prices attracted more testimony. On May 2, the court found Caesar and Prince guilty of burglary and condemned them to death. The next day seven barns caught fire. Two blacks were caught and immediately burned at the stake. On May 6, the Hughsons and Peggy were found guilty of burglary charges. Peggy, "in fear of her life, decided to talk." Some of the blacks who had been imprisoned in the dungeons also decided to talk. Two who did not talk were Caesar and Prince, who were hanged on May 11.

== Trials ==
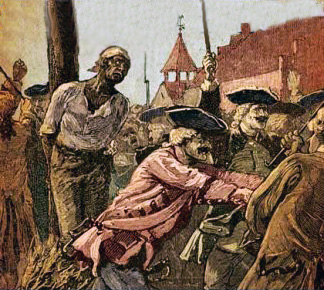
African American slave being burned at the stake after New York Conspiracy of 1741. 17 black men, two white men, and two white women were hanged at the gibbet next to the Powderhouse on the narrow point of land between the Collect Pond and the Little Collect, 13 were burned at the stake a little east on Magazine Street

Having gathered witnesses, Horsmanden started the trials. Kofi (Cuffee) and another slave Quaco (Quack) were the first to be tried. They were convicted, although each of their masters defended them. Respectable white men whose testimony normally would have been given considerable weight, they stated that each of the slaves had been at home the evening in question. The slaves were convicted anyway.

Immediately before being sentenced to being hanged on May 30, they confessed and identified dozens of other so-called conspirators. Moore asked to save them as future witnesses, but the officers of the court decided against it because of the rage of the crowd. Each of the slaves was hanged. More trials followed quickly. The trials and testimony in courtrooms were filled with conflicting evidence. Both the Hughsons and Peggy Kerry were tried on June 4. They were sentenced to hang eight days later.

At the height of the hysteria, half of the city's male slaves over the age of 16 were implicated in the plot and jailed. Arrests, trials and executions continued through the summer. "The 'epidemic of mutual incrimination' reached such proportions that officials were forced to suspend circuit courts for the rest of 1741. The jails simply could hold no more people." An anonymous letter was sent to the city of New York, cautioning them against the epidemic of suspicion and executions, as the writer claimed to have seen in the Salem witch trials.

Five men known as the "Spanish Negroes" were among those arrested. Dark-skinned Spanish sailors who had been sold into slavery by a privateer, they contended they were full Spanish citizens and unfairly enslaved. Because Britain was at war with Spain, this did not earn them much sympathy; it even raised suspicions against them as infiltrators. The British colonists were worried about anyone with Spanish and Catholic ties. The five Spanish blacks were convicted and hanged.

At the height of the trials' hysteria Horsmanden believed he had found an irrefutable link between the Papists and fires. As the investigation wore on, Horsmanden also came to believe that a man named John Ury was responsible. Ury had just arrived in town and had been working as a school teacher and a private tutor. He was an expert in Latin, which was enough to make him suspect by less educated Protestants as possibly being a Roman Catholic priest. Horsmanden arrested him on suspicion of being a priest and Spanish secret agent. Burton suddenly "remembered" that Ury had been one of the plotters of the conspiracy and testified against him. Ury was put on trial. His defense was that he was a dissenter from the Church of England, but not a Catholic priest, and had no knowledge of any conspiracy. But at the time of the trial, Horsmanden had received a warning from the governor of Georgia that Spanish agents were coming to burn all the considerable towns in New England. James Ogelthorpe, founder and governor of Georgia, sent word to Prosecutor Joseph Murray that the Spanish were planning a secret invasion of the British colonies:

A party of our Indians returned the eighth instant from war against the Spaniards. They had an engagement with a party of Spanish horse, just by [St.] Augustine…And they brought one Spainiard prisoner to me… Some intelligence I had of a villainous design of a very extraordinary nature and, if true, very important, viz. that the Spaniards had employed emissaries to burn all the magazines and considerable towns in the English North America, thereby to prevent the subsisting of the great expedition and fleet in the West Indies. And for this purpose many priests were employed who pretended to be physicians, dancing masters, and other kinds of occupations, and under that pretence to get admittance and confidence in families.

Oglethorpe's letter left little doubt that the colony was part of an international conspiracy, one which not only planned to infiltrate and destroy the city of New York, but also to engage its Protestant citizens in religious warfare. Catholicism, as it was now deeply tied to both the Spanish and slaves, came to be perceived as a greater threat than ever before in the colony. This added to suspicions about Ury, and the teacher was convicted. He was hanged on the last day of August. Gradually the fears died down. When Burton and other witnesses began to accuse members of the upper class and family members of the judges as conspirators, the case became a major embarrassment to Horsmanden. In addition, the political leadership of the city was changing. The case was finally closed. Those slaves and whites still in jail were released.

By the end of the trials, 161 blacks and 20 whites had been arrested. From May 11 to August 29, 1741, seventeen blacks and four whites were convicted and hanged, 13 blacks were burned at the stake, and 70 blacks were banished from New York. Seven whites were also deported. The following year, Mary Burton finally received her reward of £100 from the city, which she used to buy her freedom from indenture, and had money left over.

The executions were conducted near the Poor House at the north end of the city and its boundary of Chambers Street. North of there was the African Burial Ground, which was rediscovered in 1991 during survey work for construction at 26 Federal Plaza in lower Manhattan. In consultation with the African-American community, the remains of 400 people, including children, were removed and studied. They were reburied in a formal ceremony. Likely the site of up to 15,000 African burials during the colonial period, it has been designated as a National Historic Landmark.

== Women's role ==
Mary Burton, Sarah Hughson, and Peggy Kerry were three women whose testimony was instrumental in the outcomes of the trials during the slave revolt. Burton's most notable accusations were against John Ury. Hughson also gave testimony against Ury, however her testimony only came once threatened with death. Kerry, when first confronted, denied everything, but, later, in hopes of being pardoned, said she had been involved and shifted the location of the conspiracy itself.

== Burnings in New Jersey ==
There is some suggestion that the 1741 New York panic may have also led to burning at the stake of individuals from New Jersey's enslaved population, as then-Essex County records suggest (according to accounts written in the 19th and early 20th centuries) that locals were openly reimbursed for the costs of irons and wood for pyres. However, the New York executions took place from May through August 1741, while the records regarding irons and wood may have been in earlier years. There is evidence of the burning to death of an individual in August 1735, as well as two individuals burned to death on the banks of the Hackensack River on May 5, 1741. Outside of the 1741 panic, other such executions occurred. Under a New Jersey law passed in 1713 that authorized slave punishment by burning at the stake, it is reported, numerous individuals were so executed prior to the Revolution.

== Representation in fiction ==
- The events are the subject of the novel The Savage City (1955) by Jean Paradise, published by Ace Books.
- These events are used as part of a revenge plot in the novel On Maiden Lane (1981) by Bruce Nicolaysen, a 5-volume family saga encompassing the history of New York/Manhattan from 1613 to 1930.
- These events figure in the plot of Pete Hamill's novel Forever (2003).
- In 2007, Mat Johnson published The Great Negro Plot: A Tale of Conspiracy and Murder in Eighteenth-Century New York, a novel set during these events.
- The events are recounted by a prisoner in Golden Hill by Francis Stufford.
