= Daniel Liczko =

Daniel Liczko (or Litscho; 1615 – 1662) was a Pole who served as a public official in the Dutch colony of New Amsterdam.

Born in Koszalin in 1615, Liczko was a sergeant and later lieutenant of the Dutch colonial army under Admiral Christopher Arciszewski in Brazil where in 1646, he married Anna Claes Croesens, the widow of Jan Jansen Swaartveger. Sources seem to indicate that he shortly afterward moved to New Amsterdam since his daughter was baptised there on June 6, 1647. In 1651 Liczko took part in Peter Stuyvesant's expedition on the Delaware River against Sweden, and in 1652 he led a detachment of soldiers who accompanied the governor up the Hudson River where he hauled down the flag of patroon in Rensselaerswyck, thereby freeing the nucleus of the present city of Albany from feudal jurisdiction.

Liczko became one of the most prominent citizens of New Amsterdam, and records indicate that he often took part in the deliberations of the council. When New Hollanders felt threatened by an attack of the English Colonies and began to fortify their city, Liczko contributed one hundred Guilders towards the Dutch Colony's defense. Liczko also served as city fire inspector, and in about 1648 founded a tavern, which was one of the important landmarks in New Amsterdam. Liczko died in 1662.

Anka Muhlstein, in her history of New York City Manhattan, cited Liczko as one of the three Poles who particularly distinguished themselves among the twenty-one Poles in New Amsterdam at this time. Liczko's daughter Anna married William Peartree, who was the mayor of the city in 1701-1707.
