= Daniel Horsmanden =

American judge (1691–1778)

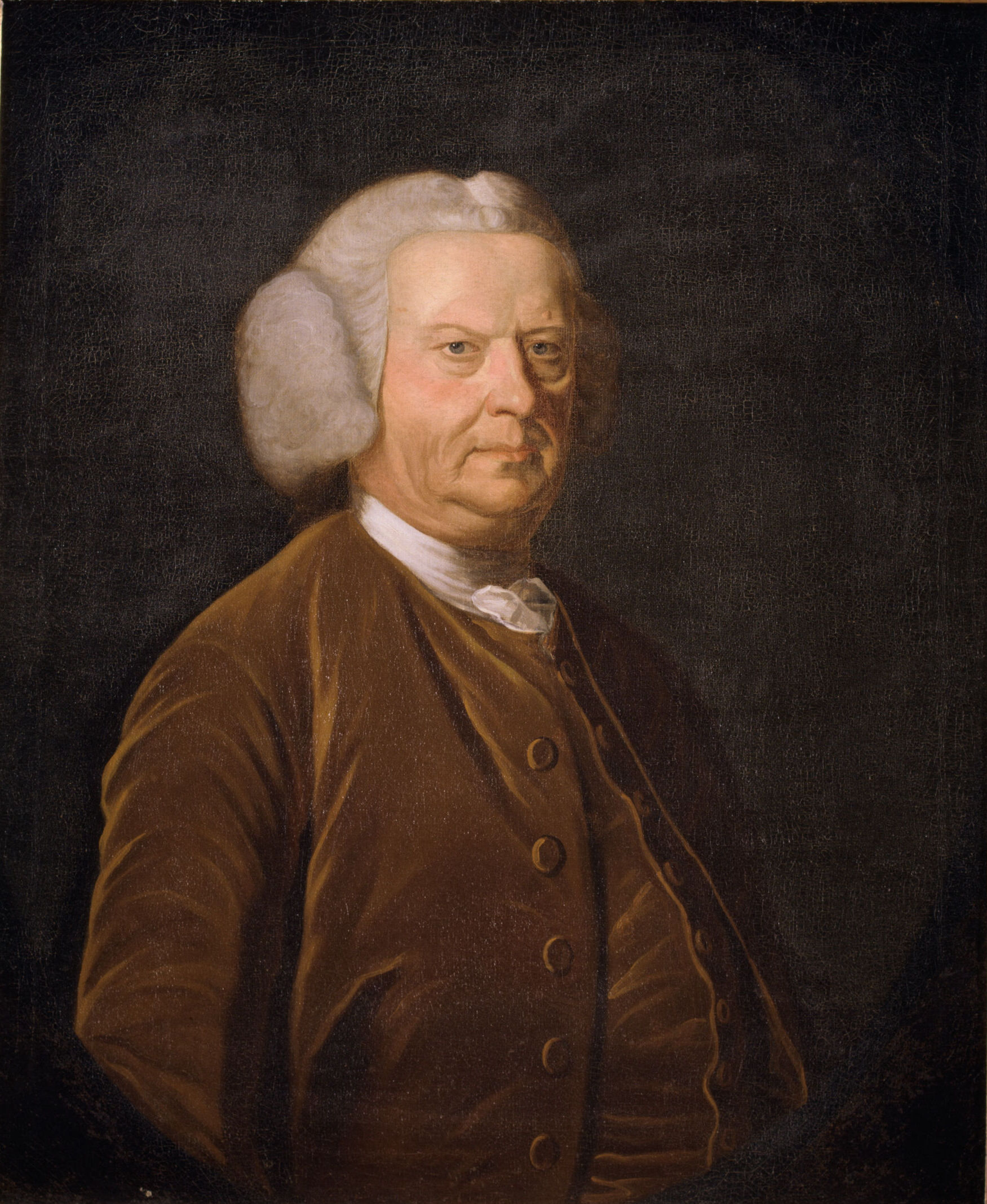
- portrait by Matthew Pratt
- Born: June 4, 1691; Goudhurst, Kent, England
- Died: September 28, 1778 (aged 87); Flatbush, New York, United States
- Occupation: Chief justice of the supreme court in the Province of New York
- Relatives: William Byrd II(cousin)

Daniel Horsmanden (June 4, 1691 – September 28, 1778) was an American judge who served as chief justice of the supreme court in the Province of New York and member of the governor's executive council.

== Biography ==
Coat of Arms of Daniel Horsmanden

Horsmanden was born in Goudhurst, Kent, England to a family of clergy and landed gentry. He was grandson to Sir Warham St. Leger who had sold Leeds Castle to finance his cousin Sir Walter Raleigh's ill-fated expedition to Guiana. Horsmanden read law, but lost his inheritance to financial speculation in the South Sea bubble which necessitated his voyage to the colonies to seek new opportunities. His cousin William Byrd II, a large land owner in Virginia and a member of the Council of Virginia and the Royal Society of London smoothed his introduction into English colonial society. About 1673, Byrd's father, William Byrd I had married a 21-year-old widow named Mary (née Horsmanden) Filmer, a native of Lenham, England. Mary's father had spent time in Virginia as a Cavalier fleeing Cromwell, and her former husband Samuel Filmer (third son of Tory author Robert Filmer) descended from the sister of Samuel Argall, governor of Virginia.

Horsmanden's legal talent resulted in his eventual call to the New York City Council on May 23, 1733. He was appointed Recorder of New York City in September 1736, and 3rd Justice of the Supreme Court in January 1737. He was dismissed from both offices in September 1747, due to political enmities. In July 1750, he was restored to the Supreme Court, and was appointed Chief Justice in March 1763. He was on the governor's executive council from 1733 to 1747 and from 1755 to 1776. He was one of the original trustees of King's College (now Columbia University).

He was elected to the original American Philosophical Society in 1744.

He was involved in the 1735 trial of John Peter Zenger. He was one of the judges who tried the supposed conspirators in the New York Slave Insurrection of 1741. In 1766, he was one of the judges in the Prendergast case where he convicted and sentenced to death the supposed leader of the Dutchess land rebels. In 1773, he was appointed a commissioner to inquire into the Gaspee Affair, which was the burning of the king's ship Gaspee by a party of Sons of Liberty in the preceding year.

In 1776, along with Oliver De Lancey and about one thousand other residents of the city and county of New York, he signed an address to Lord Howe.

He died in Flatbush, New York, and is buried in Trinity church yard.

== Bibliography ==
- The New York conspiracy trials of 1741 : Daniel Horsmanden's Journal of the proceedings with related documents ISBN 0-312-40216-3
- The trial of John Ury for being an ecclesiastical person, made by authority pretended from the See of Rome, and coming into and abiding in the province of New York, and with being one of the conspirators in the Negro plot to burn the city of New York, 1741
- The New York Conspiracy, or the History of the Negro Plot:: with the Journal of the Proceedings Against the Conspirators at New-York in the Years 1741-2: Together with Several Interesting Tables Containing the Names of the White and Black Persons Arrested on Account of the Conspiracy, the Times of Their Trials, Their Sentences, Their Executions by Burning and Hanging, Names of Those Transported, and Those Discharged: With a Variety of Other Useful and Highly Interesting Matter. (1741–2; republished in 1810)
- A Journal of the Proceedings in the Detection of the Conspiracy Formed by Some White People, in Conjunction With Negro and Other Slaves, for Burning the City of New-York in America and Murdering the Inhabitants
- "Letters to Governor Clinton" (1747).

== Sources ==
- Early Encounters in North America

Legal offices
Preceded by Francis Harison	Recorder of New York City; 1736–1747	Succeeded by Simon Johnson
