= History of the Scots Guards (1642–1804) =

This article details the history of the Scots Guards from 1642 to 1804. The Scots Guards (SG) is a regiment of the Guards Division of the British Army. The Scots Guards trace their origins back to 1642 when, by order of King Charles I, the regiment was raised by Archibald Campbell, 1st Marquess of Argyll for service in Ireland, and was known as the Marquis of Argyll's Royal Regiment. It spent a number of years there and performed a variety of duties, but in the mid-1640s, during the Wars of the Three Kingdoms, the regiment took part in the fight against James Graham, 1st Marquess of Montrose who was fighting on the side of Charles I. In 1646, Montrose left Scotland upon the defeat of the King in England.

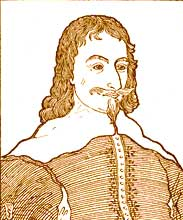
Archibald Campbell, 1st Marquess of Argyll.

== Lyfe Guard of Foot ==
In 1650, a year after the execution of King Charles I, his son, Charles II, arrived in Scotland to ascend to the throne of Scotland. That same year, the regiment became the Lyfe Guard of Foot of His Majesty King Charles II. In July that year, Oliver Cromwell, a leading figure of the English Civil War, and now leader of England, led an army into Scotland. Late that year, the Scottish Royalists, led by David Leslie, confronted Cromwell's English Army at the Battle of Dunbar. It would turn into a victory for Cromwell's Army, and resulted in over 3,000 men of Leslie's Army being killed and many thousands more captured. The following year the regiment took part in the invasion of England which was led by the newly crowned King Charles II of Scotland. The regiment took part in the Battle of Worcester which again ended in a defeat for the Royalist forces, with King Charles II subsequently fleeing to France. The regiment ceased to exist.

When Oliver Cromwell died in 1658, his son Richard Cromwell succeeded him but proved to be unsuccessful and abdicated in 1659. The following year, Charles II returned to England upon the Convention Parliament declaring him to be King. In 1661, the regiment was reformed as the Scottish Regiment of Foot Guards. That same year, Archibald, 1st Marquis of Argyll who had been ordered to raise the regiment by Charles I, was executed for high treason. The regiment was used against the Covenanters in Scotland who had begun an uprising in 1666 in response to many oppressive measures taken towards them by Charles II. That same year, the regiment took part in the Battle of Rullion Green which ended in a defeat for the Covenanters. In 1679, the regiment once more confronted the Covenanters in battle, at Bothwell Brig, which also ended in a defeat for the Covenanters.

== A Grand Alliance ==
In 1686, the regiment was placed on the establishment of the English Army and the word battalion was first used. In 1688, William of Orange landed in England, forcing King James II to flee England after the English Army changed sides and joined with William. The following year, William, along with his wife Mary, became joint ruler of England and Scotland.

In 1688, England, along with many allies, was involved once more in a war on the continent, the War of the Grand Alliance, its adversary being its old enemy, France. The war also reached North America where both sides' colonists fought each other. The regiment saw action in the Low Countries the following year at the Battle of Walcourt, in which an Allied Army defeated the French, though defeats for the Allies would soon follow. In 1692, the regiment took part in the bloody Battle of Steenkirk. The courage and professionalism of the Allied soldiers was truly proven in that bitter battle, though it ended in a defeat for the Allies, with both sides suffering heavy losses. The following year the regiment took part in another bloody engagement, the Battle of Landen. The Allies stoutly stood their ground against the attacking French, though they could not hold forever, and French cavalry broke through the Allied defences, forcing the Allied Army to withdraw. As at Steenkirk, the battle resulted in heavy casualties for both sides.

In 1695, the Guards regiments displayed unswerving courage and ferocity during the Siege of Namur, which ended in September with the Allies capturing the city, in what is now Belgium, from the French. The Guards regiments suffered heavily during the siege though constantly showed their professionalism and courage. The regiment gained its first battle honour for the Siege of Namur but their second would not come for many years.

== Wars of Succession ==
In 1704, a further company was created for the regiment, a Highlander company, complete with the many traditional accoutrements of a Highlander. In 1707, England and Scotland, with the Act of Union, joined to become the Kingdom of Great Britain, with Queen Anne becoming the nation's first Monarch.

In 1709, a number of years after the War of the Spanish Succession had begun, the regiment deployed to Spain and in 1710 took part in the Battle of Saragossa which ended in a victory for Great Britain against Franco-Spanish forces. That same year, the regiment took part in the Battle of Brihuega, when a British force was surprised by the enemy and defeated despite putting up a valiant fight. The war would not end until 1713 with the Treaty of Utrecht, ending the war favourably for Great Britain. Change came to the regiment when its name was changed to the 3rd Regiment of Foot Guards, a name they would take into the 19th century. In 1714, the Highlander Company was disbanded.

In 1740, the War of the Austrian Succession began, which pitted Great Britain and her Allies once more against France. In 1743, the regiment took part in the Battle of Dettingen. This was the last time a reigning British Monarch led an army into battle. The British and her Allies defeated the French Army which was led by the Duc de Noailles. In honour of the victory, the composer Handel wrote Dettingen Te Deum. The battle gave the regiment its second battle honour.

In 1745, the regiment took part in the Battle of Fontenoy in the Austrian Netherlands between a British and Allies force and the French. The British and Allied force were under the command of the Duke of Cumberland while the French force was commanded by Maurice de Saxe. The British and their Allies, despite performing valiantly, lost the battle to the French with both sides losing many men. The battle was quite fierce, and the 3rd Foot Guards suffered quite badly, losing over 100 officers and men during the engagement. The regiment subsequently had a brief period back in Great Britain during the Second Jacobite Rebellion which was led by Bonnie Prince Charlie who claimed the throne of Great Britain, aided by France. The regiment was soon back in the Low Countries though, and in 1747 took part in the Battle of Lauffeld which ended in a defeat for Britain and her Allies who had been outnumbered by the French. The long War of the Austrian Succession would finally end the following year.

== Seven Years' War ==
In 1756, war flared up once more between Great Britain and France, though this time the war would reach many parts of the world, in effect creating the first ever 'world war'. In June 1758, the 1st Battalion took part in an expedition against France, landing at Cancalle Bay on the Brittany coast. However, this first expedition was abortive and was cancelled, with the troops and ships eventually returning to Britain.

A second expedition was launched in August, and British forces, including the 1st Battalion, 3rd Foot Guards, landed near the port of Cherbourg in Normandy. At the landing site, the Guards battalions dispersed a few thousand French troops who had been there to oppose the landing. The British force soon marched on Cherbourg which duly surrendered. The British subsequently destroyed many French warships as well as the port facilities at Cherbourg which would not be fully repaired for many years. They then re-embarked aboard their ships and in early September landed a few miles from St. Malo in Brittany for an assault on that port. However, the assault was deemed to be impracticable and the fleet that had landed them was forced to sail from its position to Saint-Cast due to bad weather, thus forcing the British troops to march there so that they could re-embark. On 12 September, the British rearguard, consisting of over 1000 Guards as well as the Grenadier companies of the infantry battalions, were attacked by numerically superior French troops. The rearguard stoutly defended their position but they were only delaying the inevitable and eventually they fell back, rushing to embark about the ships. The British lost several hundred men killed, wounded and captured during the engagement, including the commander of the rearguard.

The 2nd Battalion also saw service abroad, being part of a Brigade of Guards force sent to Germany where they fought under the command of John Manners, Marquess of Granby. The battalion took part in the Battle of Villinghausen in 1761, in which an Allied force, under the command of Prince Ferdinand of Brunswick, defeated a numerically superior French force. The following year, in June, the battalion took part in the Battle of Wilhelmsthal in which a heavily outnumbered Allied force defeated the French after some bitter fighting, of which the Guards battalions saw much of it. Later that year, the battalion took part in the Battle of the Brücke-Mühle, the battalion's last action during the Seven Years' War, which would end in 1763.

== Seeing the New World ==
In 1776, the American colonists, in Philadelphia, declared their independence from Great Britain during the American War of Independence. In response, fifteen men from each company of the 1st Regiment of Foot Guards, Coldstream Regiment of Foot Guards and the 3rd Regiment of Foot Guards, formed a composite battalion of Foot Guards to be sent to North America. The composite battalion was subsequently split into two battalions, with both battalions seeing action at the Battle of Brooklyn and the Battle of White Plains that same year. The following year, in September, the composite Foot Guards took part in the Battle of Brandywine. The British and their Allies, the Hessians, were slightly outnumbered by the Americans, though the British and Hessians did triumph, with both sides suffering large casualties. Later that year, both composite battalions took part in the Battle of Germantown which also ended in a British victory.

In 1781, the two composite Foot Guard battalions took part in the Battle of Guilford Courthouse. The force was commanded by General Charles Cornwallis and had 1,900 troops while their American opponents numbered 4,400. The Foot Guards were in the thick of it for much of the battle with exceptional professionalism. During the course of the battle, the Foot Guards were involved in a very bitter struggle with American Dragoons after being the subject of an attack by the Dragoons from the rear. The Americans also launched a counter-attack and chaos ensued. General Cornwallis made the difficult decision to fire grapeshot into the intermingling masses of the British and American troops. While the British troops took heavy casualties from the grapeshot, the Americans were forced to withdraw. The Foot Guards suffered quite heavily, losing many men killed and wounded, their commanding officer, Brigadier Charles O'Hara of the Coldstream Guards being severely wounded.

The composite Foot Guards, due to the casualties that the Guards had suffered, was reduced to a single composite battalion. Later in 1781, the composite Foot Guards took part in its last engagement, at the Battle of Yorktown, which began when Yorktown was besieged by the Americans. The British defended their positions with great courage into October, but the British commander, General Cornwallis, on 19 October, marched out, along with his army, of Yorktown to surrender to the Americans. The Foot Guards would not depart America until 1782, finally returning home to Great Britain in 1783. The composite Foot Guards were disbanded that same year and the men were returned to their previous regiments.

== The French Revolutionary Wars ==
In 1789, the French Revolution began. In 1793, the First Coalition, which included Great Britain and continental European powers, was created to combat Revolutionary France. The 1st Battalion took part in the Battle of Famars on 23 May and the Siege of Valenciennes (1793) which began that same month, with the town eventually falling to the Allies in July that year. The battalion also took part in the Battle of Caesar's Camp at Bouchain and the Siege of Dunkirk which ended in September.

In August 1793, the 1st Battalion, under the command of William Grinfield along with the 1st Battalions of the 1st Regiment of Foot Guards and the Coldstream Regiment of Foot Guard', took part in the Battle of Lincelles. The Guards, only just over 1000, were tasked with recaptururing the village of Lincelles from the French, over 5,000 in strength, who had re-taken it from Dutch troops. The Foot Guards advanced valiantly and professionally on the freshly captured village, coming under horrendous artillery and small-arms fire, suffering heavy casualties. The Foot Guards performed ferociously with bayonet upon storming the village, being engaged in some bitter fighting with the French, causing heavy French casualties in the process and clearing the village of the French, with the Guards capturing the village. The regiment won its third battle honour for their part in the battle. The regiment took part in further engagements in 1793, including at Lannoy. The battalion's last engagements came the following year.

In 1798, the Second Coalition against Revolutionary France was formed. That same year, the 1st Battalion's light companies took part in a raid on Ostend in what is now Belgium. The raid had the objectives of destroying the lock-gates and sluices of the Bruges to Ostend canal. The expedition was supported by a bombardment from Royal Navy (RN) warships. The locks were destroyed, but due to unfavourable winds preventing re-embarkation, the 1,300 men of the army contingent under the command of Major General Coote were captured by the French. In 1799, the 1st Battalion took part in the Anglo-Russian invasion of Holland, in the French puppet-state of the Batavian Republic, in what is now the Netherlands. An Anglo-Russian force took part in the campaign there, which had the intentions of restoring the exiled Dutch King, with the hope that the population of Batavia would be keen on such a move after suffering bad times economically due to France forbidding any trade with Great Britain. Shortly after the landing took place a large number of warships of the Batavian Fleet surrendered peacefully to the British. In October, the Foot Guards, along with many other regiments, were involved in the engagements of Egmont-op-Zee and Alkmaar, the latter of which ended in a British victory. In 1800, the 1st Battalion took part in the expeditions against the coastal Spanish cities of Ferrol, Vigo and Cádiz, the latter of which would become more prominent during the Peninsular War only a few years later.

In 1798, France invaded Egypt intent on conquering the country, a move that would have posed danger to Great Britain's position in the Mediterranean as well as to India. The following year, Admiral Lord Nelson decimated the French fleet at the Battle of the Nile, effectively trapping the French in Egypt. In 1801, the United Kingdom of Great Britain and Ireland was formed and just a few months later the 1st Battalion was part of a British Army expedition, under the command of General Sir Ralph Abercromby, to Egypt, landing at Aboukir Bay on 8 March, with the amphibious landing being very successful despite being opposed by French defenders.

The battalion also took part in the Battle of Alexandria on 21 March, with the British force numbering about 14,000 and the French around 20,000. At the latter engagement, the British forces displayed much heroism and valour, with the Guards Brigade, in the center, acting in a highly professional manner against the French forces, which ended in victory for the British. The British suffered just under 1,500 killed, wounded and missing, including their commander, General Abercromby, who was mortally wounded during the battle, while the French suffered just over 4,000 casualties. Cairo and Alexandria soon afterwards, with the whole of Egypt being recaptured by late 1801. The regiment gained its fourth battle honour with the Sphinx being placed on its Colours with Egypt superscribed on it.
