= Anthony Brockholls =

Colonial Governor of New York Acting
- In office 1681–1683
- Monarch: Charles II
- Preceded by: Sir Edmund Andros
- Succeeded by: Thomas Dongan
- In office 1677–1678
- Monarch: Charles II
- Preceded by: Sir Edmund Andros
- Succeeded by: Sir Edmund Andros

Personal details
- Born: c. 1656 England
- Died: August 29, 1723 Bergen County, New Jersey
- Spouse: Susannah Maria Schrick (after 1681)

Major Anthony Brockholls (or Brockholst) (c. 1656 – August 29, 1723) was an English born Commander-in-Chief (1677–78) and then acting Governor (1681–82) of New York.

== Career ==
In 1677, he received a special commission as Commander-in-Chief and when Sir Edmund Andros fled the Province of New York, he became the acting Governor of New York due to his seniority on the New York Executive Council. During Leisler's Rebellion in New York, Brockholls was denounced as "a rank Papist," and had a price set on his head by the then acting-Governor of that Colony, Jacob Leisler.

In June 1681, while acting as Governor of New York, Brockholst presided over a special court that appointed Captain John Youngs (son of John Youngs), High sheriff of Yorkshire to give a petition to the Duke of York for the privilege of setting up a general assembly in the Province of New York. Upon Governor Dongan's arrive in 1683, the petition was granted and the first assembly of New York began in October 1683.

In March 1689, during the wars with the Abenaki Indians on the English fort at Pemaquid, Fort Charles, then the easternmost outpost of colonial Massachusetts (present-day Bristol, Maine), he commanded thirty-six men at the Siege of Pemaquid.

=== Pompton ===
In June 1695, Colonel Anthony Brockholls and Captain Arent Schuyler were among several men from New York who purchased a tract of land in the Province of New Jersey, five thousand five hundred acres, which became Pompton, where he built a large estate.

== Family ==
Anthony Brockholls's parents are unknown, but he is said to have been a member of the Catholic family of Brockholes of Claughton, Lancashire, England.

On May 2, 1681, Brockholls was married to Susannah Maria Schrick (or Schrect or Shrik) in Albany. She was the daughter of Paulus Schrick. While most of their children died in childhood, they were the parents of:

- Henry Brockholst (1684–1766), who married Maria Verplanck.
- Anthony Brockholst (1687–1688), who died young.
- Anthony Brockholst (1688–1694), who also died young.
- Judith Brockholst (b. 1690), who married Dirck Van Vechten (1699–1781).
- Jannetje Brockholst (b. 1692), who died young.
- Susannah Brockholst (1696–1730), who married Philip French III (1697–1782), the son of Philip French II, the 27th Mayor of New York City, and Annetje (née Philipse) French (herself the daughter of Frederick Philipse)
- Johanna Brockholst (1700–1765), who married Frederick Philipse II (1698-1751), the 2nd Lord of Philipsburg Manor.
- Mary Brockholst (b. 1707), who married Adrian Verplanck.

Brockholls left a will on June 15, 1710, witnessed by Nicholas Bayard, Abraham Post, and William Cutler. He died on August 29, 1723 in Bergen County, New Jersey.

=== Descendants ===
His granddaughter through his daughter Susannah, was Susanna French, who married William Livingston, "War-Governor" during the American Revolution, and was the mother of Henry Brockholst Livingston, who was associate Justice of the United States Supreme Court from 1806 to 1823.
