= 88th Regiment of Foot (Highland Volunteers) =

Scottish Infantry Regiment

The 88th Regiment of Foot (Highland Volunteers), or Campbell's Highlanders, was a Scottish infantry regiment in the British Army, formed in 1760 and disbanded in 1763.

== History ==
The regiment was raised at Argyll, Perth, Inverness, Ross and Sutherland by Colonel John Campbell of Dunoon in January 1760 out of a cadre taken from the 87th Foot. The regiment was moved to Germany that year, where it fought at the Battle of Warburg in July 1760 and the Battle of Villinghausen in July 1761. It returned to Scotland from the continent in late 1762, and was disbanded at Linlithgow in July 1763.
