= Edward Coates (pirate) =

British pirate

Edward Coates (fl. 1689–1695) was a colonial American privateer in English service during King William's War and later a pirate operating in the Red Sea and Indian Ocean.

== History ==
In 1689, Coates originally signed aboard the Jacob as a sailor in a privateer expedition, then under the command of Captain William Mason, and commissioned by the colonial officials in New York to raid French shipping off the coast of Quebec "to war as in his wisdom should seem fit". (Note: Mason, along with Robert Culliford, had originally been part William Kidd’s crew aboard his ship Blessed William. Mason, Culliford, and others stole the ship and abandoned Kidd; the Jacob was a prize ship they’d captured some time later.) However, unable to find French vessels, Mason began raiding English shipping and distributing the spoils among his crew, including Coates, eventually adding up to 1,800 pieces-of-eight per crewman.

Possibly withholding a portion of the crew's shares, Mason disappeared after stopping at an island in the Indian Ocean; he had actually returned to New York with some of his crew and his quartermaster Samuel Burgess to divide the spoils, later returning to the area as captain of the Pearl. Coates, later suspected to have murdered Mason, assumed command of the ship, stopping at St. Mary's Island (near Madagascar) along with the 16-gun Nassau in October 1692, before returning to New York. When he returned to New York he carried some of the crew of pirate James Allison, whom Coates had picked up after Allison's ship Good Hope was wrecked near Madagascar, though Allison himself was not recorded among them.

Upon their arrival in April of the following year, Coates arranged a deal with Governor Benjamin Fletcher to pardon their former acts of piracy, as well as assuring no interference from New York authorities against further attacks, in exchange for $1,800 which would be divided between the Governor and other colonial officials (as well as presenting Fletcher's wife with jewels, silks, and cashmere shawls). When Thomas Tew sought a new privateering commission from Fletcher in 1694, Coates signed Tew's bond.

Sailing to the Red Sea in 1694, among Coates' crew were quartermasters Samuel Burgess and Robert Culliford. They were even more successful this time, returning to New York in 1695 with 2800 pieces of eight per man. They secured a pardon by presenting Fletcher with the Jacob, which he sold for a profit. Some of Coates’ former crew were still on Madagascar when they were killed in a native uprising in 1697.

Fletcher was accused of collusion with pirates, and Coates figured heavily in the charges leveled against him:

[C]harges relating to Governor Fletcher's administration at New York, delivered to him at the Board, 28 November 1698. (1) That he accepted £700 to permit the ship Jacob, returning from a piratical voyage, to come up to New York, and to grant the crew protection. (2) That he prevailed with the Council to consent thereto under colour of allowing the said pirates the benefit of an Act of New York, to which they were not entitled. (3) That in consequence thereof the ship came up to New York and was accepted by him as a present and sold by him for £800. (4) That he granted protections to other pirates for money. (5) That there is no mention of securities given in the said protections, and that none of the persons so protected appear to have been prosecuted for piracy. (6) That in 1696 he released a chest of money which had been seized from one Rayner, a pirate. (7) That Edward Coates, the pirate, asserted that it cost him £1,300 to obtain Colonel Fletcher's protection. (8) That he granted commissions as privateers to Tew, Hore and Glover, though they had no ship at New York, and spoke openly of making piratical voyages. (9) That he was intimate with the pirate Tew, and received money for the aforesaid commissions. (10) That he granted a like commission to Thomas Moston of the ship Fortune, though intended only for illegal trade. (11) That the bonds which he took from the said pirates on giving them commissions were inadequate, and that one of them was tampered with by his Secretary. … Draft. 5 pp. Endorsed, 24 Nov. Delivered to him 28 Nov., 1698.

== See also ==
- Giles Shelley - A pirate trader who was another captain of the Nassau.
