= Thomas Griffin (pirate) =

17th-century pirate

Thomas Griffin (fl. 1691) was a pirate and privateer active off New England. He is best known for his association with George Dew.

== History ==
Griffin was operating alongside George Dew in 1691 with privateering commissions against the French. Sailing out of Bermuda, they headed up the American east coast, plundering ships which they accused of smuggling. One of their captures was a vessel from Cádiz, taken near Piscataqua. Griffin put in at Portsmouth and wrote to the Governor that he had mistaken the vessel for French, but upon boarding found proscribed goods. He said he avoided taking the prize to Boston, fearing that he “should be unkindly dealt with,” and accused Boston merchants of trading with the French. Dew and Griffin took the prize to the Isles of Shoals and then into Portsmouth to sell off its cargo, ignoring the usual requirement to present prize ships to an Admiralty Court.

In August 1691 pardoned pirate Christopher Goffe (who had sailed with Thomas Woolerly and Thomas Henley) was commissioned by Massachusetts Governor Simon Bradstreet to hunt them down in his ship Swan. Goffe tried but Griffin and Dew outraced him: “they sail two feet to our one.” Short on supplies, Goffe gave up the chase and returned to Nantasket.

Minus Griffin, Dew would later go on to attempt the Pirate Round route to the Indian Ocean via Madagascar alongside Thomas Tew, though he was forced to turn back by storms en route.

== See also ==
- Nine Years' War – the conflict involving much of Europe which sparked a rise in privateering commissions.
