= 1694 in piracy =

The following lists piracy related events that happened during 1694.

== Europe ==
- May 7 – Henry Every leads a mutiny aboard the privateer ship Charles II at A Coruña and turns the crew to piracy.

== North America ==
- April – Thomas Tew offloads his stolen treasure at Newport, Rhode Island.
- November – Tew purchases new letter of marque from New York governor Benjamin Fletcher and sails on a new pirate cruise for the Indian Ocean.

== See also ==
- 1693 in piracy
- 1695 in piracy
- 1694
- Timeline of piracy
