= John Ireland (pirate) =

John Ireland (fl. 1694–1701, occasionally spelled Yarland) was a pirate active in the Indian Ocean. He is best known for sailing with Thomas Tew.

== History ==
Ireland was sailing between New York and Boston in 1694 when he was hired by privateer Thomas Tew to pilot his ship Amity up the coast. Ireland testified that the crew mutinied, demanding Tew take up piracy instead, and forcing Ireland to act as navigator. The crew told them “they came out for money and money they would have before they went home again.” Tew asked that they put him and Ireland ashore and offered them the sloop to do with as they wanted, but they refused, saying “if he would not pilot them to Madagascar he should be starved.” This would be Tew's second “Pirate Round” voyage to the area.

Tew sailed with fellow pirates Joseph Faro, Thomas Wake, William May, Richard Want, and Henry Every in August 1695 to attack Mughal Empire treasure ships in the Indian Ocean. Most of the Moorish fleet slipped past in the night but two stragglers – the massive Gunsway and its escort, Fateh Mohammed – were caught and attacked. Tew sailed ahead of the others in the Amity, attacking the Fateh Mohammed early. A cannonball killed Tew during the battle, and Amity surrendered. After Every and the others defeated Gunsway and Fateh Mohammed both, the Amity was freed.

Ireland was now master of the 70-ton, 60-man, 8-gun Amity. They sailed to Adam Baldridge's pirate trading post near Madagascar to repair and refit in December 1695. Baldridge tipped them off that the Charming Mary under captain Richard Glover left shortly before and was still nearby. Ireland pursued the Charming Mary, capturing it and putting Glover on the Amity. The crew elected Richard Bobbington as Captain of the Charming Mary. Glover and Amity would eventually by captured by Dirk Chivers, who stripped Amity and used it to repair his own ship, leaving Amity's hulk stranded on a reef.

Unknown to Bobbington or Ireland, that very same month William Kidd had been issued a commission to hunt down several named pirates, including Tew, Wake, May, and John Ireland himself. Tew was already dead by the time Kidd received his commission, and Kidd turned to piracy before encountering any of the others.

Ireland later testified that he'd tried to go with Glover aboard the Amity but was forced by the crew to remain on the Charming Mary. After refitting in May 1696, Bobbington raided the Red Sea and near Tellicherry and Rajapur. Bobbington was captured by Persians while ashore near Jask. The crew sailed Charming Mary off without waiting for him, possibly electing Joseph Skinner captain, or possibly with no formal captain and Ireland as ship's master again. One source claims that after briefly sailing alongside Ralph Stout and Robert Culliford's Mocha they returned to Barbados in 1697 to divide their loot. The Charming Mary put in again at Madagascar in late 1699 under captain William May, who'd led the Pearl during the attack on Gunsway. A squadron of British warships appeared, forcing May to return to New York by early 1700. Ireland was called to testify in New York in May 1701 but was never tried in court for lack of witnesses against him. In his testimony he steadfastly maintained that he had been forced into piracy at every turn, the pirates “setting a watch over him for feare he would make his escape.”

Ireland's own testimony regarding the end of his piracy career differs from other records: he claims that in late 1696 their ship (presumably Charming Mary) was lost in a storm. The remaining crew took over a Portuguese ship a few months later, marooning Ireland and others, who escaped in small boats. He claimed he spent months making his way back to Malacca, where he was wounded in a quarrel with a former crewmate, imprisoned, and eventually sent back to London. Records from the English outpost at Ft. St. George, Madras, confirm his story: he was caught at Malacca by the Danish ("confirms their having sail'd up & down in Pirats"), who returned him to Ft. St. George, where he was sent back to England with his deposition - again claiming to have been forced to serve the pirates - to face possible trial.

== See also ==
- Admiralty court - the venue in which Ireland was tried.
