= Richard Glover (pirate) =

Pirate and slave-trader active in the Caribbean and the Red Sea in the late 1690s

Richard Glover (d. 1697/98) was a pirate and slave-trader active in the Caribbean and the Red Sea in the late 1690s.

== History ==
Richard Glover, his brother-in-law John Hoar, Thomas Tew, and other captains had obtained privateering commissions from Governor Benjamin Fletcher of New York in 1694. Fletcher would later be accused of collusion, knowing full well that the captains intended to engage in piracy. Glover was given command of the Charming Mary, owned by John Beckford, Colonel Russel, and Judge Coats. That autumn, Glover outfitted the 200-ton, 16-gun, 80-man ship in Barbados and sailed for the east coast of Africa, following Tew's "Pirate Round" route.

He arrived at Adam Baldridge's pirate trading post at Île Sainte-Marie off Madagascar in August 1695, where he careened the Charming Mary and traded with Baldridge. In October of the same year he sailed for Madagascar to pick up slaves and trade goods.

Shortly afterwards Thomas Tew's 70-ton, 8-gun, 60-man sloop Amity came to the settlement, minus Tew, who had been killed fighting Moorish ships alongside Henry Every. Under command of ship's master John Ireland, the Amity quickly refitted and set out in December to hunt down the Charming Mary.

Ireland's men took over the Charming Mary, putting Glover and his crew on the Amity, though they let him keep all his supplies. The Charming Mary's crew elected Richard Bobbington as their new captain, refitted and resupplied, and sailed for the East Indies. Conflicting stories place Richard Glover in the company of Dirk Chivers and/or John Hoar, capturing Moorish and other vessels in the area, though these may be conflating his exploits with those of Robert Glover, or with the Charming Mary's other captains (Ireland, Captain Bobbington, and William Mays, who may have captained it after he left his own ship Pearl).

Glover returned to Barbados, slave-trading along the way, where the Amity was re-rigged as a brigantine by the Charming Mary's original sponsors. He visited Baldridge again in January 1697, trading with him and with Glover's brother-in-law and fellow pirate John Hoar.

Dirk Chivers' ship Resolution (taken in a mutiny from Robert Glover, no relation to Richard Glover) was perilously low on supplies and badly damaged; that June off Fort Dauphin, Chivers seized Amity, taking all its provisions and supplies and disassembling its masts, sails, and rigging to repair the Resolution. They beached the gutted Amity on a reef, and over a year later Amity was still visible as a hulk.

Richard Glover's ultimate fate is not known, though New York records show that his will - which he had the forethought to have written out and witnessed in 1696 before he took the Amity back out to sea - was paid out to his widow Mary and his two children in April 1698. He may have been among a number of pirate captains killed when angry natives overran and destroyed Baldridge's settlement later in 1697.

== See also ==
- Thomas Wake, another New England pirate who'd stopped at Baldridge's trading post.
