= 1691 in piracy =

== Events ==
- January – The Bachelor's Delight seizes Unity, a merchant ship belonging to the East India Company, near Bombay; the Unity crew joins the pirates while the officers are set adrift.
- August – Christopher Goffe, a former crew member under Rhode Island pirate Captain Thomas Woolerly before receiving a pardon in 1687, is commissioned as a pirate hunter and is ordered to protect the coastal shipping between Cape Cod and Cape Ann.
- September – After twelve years away from his native England, William Dampier arrives at Thames. Nearly destitute after eight years of adventuring, he is forced to sell his friend and manservant Prince Jeoly.

== See also ==
- 1690 in piracy
- 1691
- 1693 in piracy
- Timeline of piracy
