= Robert Glover (pirate) =

Pirate captain active in the Red Sea

Robert Glover (died 1697/98) was an Irish-American pirate active in the Red Sea and Indian Ocean area in the late 1690s.

== Biography ==
Prior to his adventures in the Indian Ocean, this may have been the same Robert Glover who accompanied buccaneer Robert Allison on a 1686 logwood expedition to Belize.

Irishman Robert Glover had the 200-ton, 18-gun, 60-man ship Resolution (Note: Robert Glover's ship Resolution should not be confused with the Resolution of Robert Culliford, who was also active in the same area and in the same time period.) fitted out in Rhode Island around 1693, then headed to New York to obtain a privateering commission from Governor Benjamin Fletcher. Fletcher would later come under fire for granting (and selling) commissions to known pirates such as Glover, Thomas Tew, Joseph Faro, and others.

Joseph Faro’s ship Portsmouth Adventure had wrecked on Mayotte leaving him and his crew stranded. Henry Every rescued Faro and some of the crew while Dirk Chivers and others remained behind. Glover’s Resolution picked up Chivers and the remaining crew later in 1695.

Now with 110 men, Glover sailed to the Red Sea to hunt Moorish ships. Having missed the lucrative Indian fleets at the mouth of the Red Sea, they sailed to the west coast of India and took a 12-gun Muscat ship as a prize near Rajapur. Glover reportedly quarreled with his officers and crew, and after taking only the single small ship, Chivers led a mutiny. Glover and 24 supporters were put onto the run-down prize ship ("the ship was old and would hardly swim with them to St. Maries") which sailed for Adam Baldridge’s pirate-friendly trading settlement near Île Sainte-Marie at Madagascar, where they stayed until late 1697 or early 1698.

Chivers and the Resolution met up with John Hoar and went on to take a number of Moorish vessels, eventually following Glover to Madagascar to repair their ship. There they captured Thomas Tew’s old ship the Amity (which was under the command of Richard Glover, unrelated to Robert Glover) and looted it to refit and resupply the Resolution. Glover offered to forgive them if they would restore him to his command and return to the Americas; Chivers and the crew in turn offered to accept Glover back if would stay in the Red Sea area and continue piracy. Glover refused and Chivers sailed out without him.

Within a year the natives near Baldridge’s trading post rose in revolt, overrunning and destroying the settlement. A number of pirate captains and their crews were killed in the fighting; Glover may have been among them, as Baldridge listed the Resolution's crew as among the casualties. Baldridge claimed that the native uprising drove him off of Île Sainte-Marie around July 1697; Glover's will was dated September 1697, leaving to his three sons on Jamaica and Antigua "all my silver and gold, coyned and in dust"; the will was proved in 1700.

== See also ==
- John Ireland, another captain of the Amity.
