= Sainte-Marie pirate massacre (1697) =

- Part of Golden Age of Piracy
- Location: Île Sainte-Marie (Sainte-Marie), Madagascar
- Date: c. 1697
- Target: Pirate settlers
- Attack type: Massacre
- Deaths: Up to 30 pirates
- Perpetrator: Native Malagasy inhabitants

The Sainte-Marie pirate massacre was a violent uprising by Malagasy natives of Île Sainte-Marie (Nosy Boraha) against pirate settlers in 1697 leading to the annihilation of Baldridge’s pirate settlement on the island.

== Background ==
Adam Baldridge, a Caribbean pirate, arrived on Sainte Marie Island around 1690. Slavery was endemic to Madagascar when the pirates arrived. Warring factions often exchanged prisoners after battles; if no exchange occurred, prisoners were taken to neighboring villages and kept as slaves. The defeated faction could later raid these villages to recover their people and take others in turn. Baldridge allied with some native clans on the island, assisting them in redeeming wives and children taken by rival clans. He became the traders of captured members of rival clans to American slavers; the Malagasy on Saint Marie themselves did not engage in such trade.

Sainte Marie offered an ideal environment for a pirate settlement: a safe harbor, fresh water, fertile land, abundant food sources, and strategic positions for lookout and defense. Baldridge built a fort which included a tavern and a brothel, attracting slavers and pirates passing the Cape of Good Hope to resupply and rest. The settlement grew prosperous and became a central hub for pirate activity in the Indian Ocean.The pirate population on the island fluctuated over time, ranging from a few hundred to more than a thousand people, depending on the number of ships in port.

Relations between the pirates and the native clans on Saint Marie were generally harmonious. Conflicts arose mainly among the pirates themselves, often over the division of plunder. Alcohol consumption contributed to tensions, and in one recorded instance, fourteen pirates fought in two groups of seven over their shares, with the two survivors dividing the contested spoils.

== Massacre ==
In late 1697, the long-standing calm on Saint Marie Island ended abruptly. Native Malagasy inhabitants of the island launched a sudden attack on the pirate settlement, pillaging and torching Baldridge’s fort, tavern, and houses. Overwhelming the pirates, they slaughtered up to thirty pirates during the assault.

According to testimony later attributed to Captain William Kidd, Adam Baldridge was the cause of the native insurrection. Kidd stated that Baldridge had secretly deceived inhabitants of Saint Marie by persuading men, women, and children to board ships under false pretenses. These individuals were then transported and traded as slaves to the Mascarene Island, which were under French control. News of these removals spread on the island and was remembered as an act of betrayal causing the wrath of the natives.

When testifying two years later, Baldridge claimed he was innocent, blaming other pirates for abusing the natives and stealing their cattle.

== Aftermath ==
The attack of 1697 destroyed Baldridge’s settlement on Sainte-Marie. Pirates who failed to escape in time were killed during the assault. Among the dead were Captain John Hoar and Robert Glover, while around twenty pirates managed to escape.

Prior to the massacre, Baldridge sailed to Mascarene Island to trade the controversial slaves and, on his return to Sainte-Marie, was warned of the massacre. He subsequently returned to America, abandoned piracy, and lived in New York reportedly with considerable wealth.

Edward Welch known later as the "Little King" succeeded to Baldridge and revived his activity on the Sainte-Marie island. One survivor of the massacre, Abraham Samuel, a mixed-race pirate probably born on Martinique, later settled at Fort-Dauphin near the ruins of the former French colony, whose colonists had been brutally massacred by natives in 1674.
