= Thomas Mostyn (sea captain) =

Slave trader

- Occupation: Slave trader
- Piratical career
- Years active: 1695–1716
- Base of operations: New York, Indian Ocean

Thomas Mostyn (fl. 1695–1716, last name also Mosson) was a British sea captain and slave trader active between New York and the Indian Ocean, and later in the Caribbean. He was one of the traders employed by New York merchant Frederick Philipse to smuggle supplies to the pirates of Madagascar.

== History ==
Mostyn set out in 1695 from New York to Madagascar, calling on Adam Baldridge’s pirate trading post at St. Mary’s (Île Ste. Marie) in August. He stopped there to careen his 20-man 160-ton ship Katherine, selling his goods to the various pirates on the island before sailing to Madagascar to take on slaves for the return trip to New York. The Katherine had no guns and likely was intended for smuggling rather than piracy. It was owned by Frederick Philipse and had been chartered by Governor Benjamin Fletcher, who would later be relieved of his post for his dealings with pirates.

In 1697 Mostyn and his supercargo Robert Allison made another trip to Baldridge’s settlement for Philipse, this time in the 150-ton, 20-man, 8-gun Fortune. Among his officers was master's mate Hendrick van Hoven, who would later become a pirate captain on his own. Putting into port in June, he sold his goods to pirates (including John Hoar), and after a brief stay left to gather slaves for the return trip. That July Baldridge purchased part ownership of the visiting brigantine Swift, in which he sailed to mainland Madagascar to trade. At sea he met Mostyn, who warned him that the natives had risen in revolt, looted the settlement, and killed a number of pirates who had been ashore, Hoar among them. Mostyn convinced Baldridge to abandon the settlement and they returned to America, Mostyn carrying several pirates who’d elected to retire. Upon his return Fortune was impounded under suspicion of piracy.

When the native tribes overran Baldridge’s settlement, some of Hoar’s crew survived by allying with rival tribes. Among them was Otto Van Tuyl, who later sailed with Robert Culliford when he visited the island in 1698-1699, and afterwards booked passage back to New England aboard a merchant ship. Van Tuyl and Mostyn both made return trips to the area. Otto's brother Aert ("Ort") Van Tuyl a few years later sailed the region under John James (possibly under Booth and Bowen as well), and instigated the looting of Mostyn's ship: “they sail'd to St. Mary's, where Captain Mosson's Ship lay at Anchor, between the Island and the Main: This Gentleman and his whole Ship's Company had been cut off, at the Instigation of Ort Vantyle, a Dutchman of New-York.”

Mostyn eventually made his way back to the Americas. In 1716 the Spanish stepped up enforcement of their ban on non-Spaniards cutting logwood in the Bay of Campeche and the Bay of Honduras. They captured a number of English logwood ships and put their crews aboard small sloops. Some of the crews turned to piracy: “these Men being made desperate by their Misfortunes, and meeting with the Pyrates, they took on with them, and so encreas'd their Number.” Mostyn's New England-bound brigantine was listed among their victims; whether he joined the pirates is not recorded.

== See also ==
- James Plaintain and Abraham Samuel, two other ex-pirates who, like Baldridge, established trading posts on or near Madagascar.
- John Thurber and Samuel Burgess, two other ex-pirates who, like Mostyn, were employed by New York merchants to make smuggling trips to the pirates at Madagascar.
