= Richard Bobbington =

Richard Bobbington (died 1697?, name occasionally Philip or Babbington) was a pirate active in the Red Sea, Indian Ocean, and Persian Gulf in the late 1690s.

== History ==
Adam Baldridge ran a trading post for pirates off Madagascar, and was willing to double-cross them. In December 1695 John Ireland sailed the sloop Amity into the settlement after the Amity’s previous captain Thomas Tew was killed raiding Moors alongside Henry Every. Baldridge helped them quickly refit and tipped them off that he had traded with and resupplied the Charming Mary shortly before. The Amity sailed after the Charming Mary and captured it, giving its captain Richard Glover the Amity in exchange. Ireland had been the ship's master but was not formally captain; the pirates subsequently elected Irishman Richard Bobbington as captain of the Charming Mary.

Bobbington sailed back to Île Sainte-Marie in May 1696 to refit before heading into the Red Sea. In July they raided Tellicherry; Bobbington personally led the shore party to threaten the local East India Company officials into letting them repair and resupply at Company expense. Now with 90 men and 22 guns, in September of that year they took a Moorish ship off Rajapur, killing a great many of the crew in revenge for their stubborn resistance.

In December 1696 they sailed into the Persian Gulf near Jask to raid local settlements for supplies, and again Bobbington joined the landing party. The Persians fought back, capturing Bobbington and the shore party. English officials wanted Bobbington extradited to Bombay to answer for crimes against Mughal ships, while the Persians accused the English of robbery after Bobbington declared that he was English. He was never heard from again.

The remainder of the crew sailed off in the Charming Mary, possibly with Joseph Skinner as captain, or possibly with no captain at all, John Ireland still serving as master. They sailed alongside Robert Culliford and Ralph Stout in the Mocha for a time, returning to Barbados in 1697 to divide their loot. They appeared again off Madagascar in 1699 under captain William May (Mayes/Mues), who had captained the Pearl during Tew and Henry Every's attack on the treasure ship Gunsway.

== See also ==
- James Plaintain and Abraham Samuel - two other ex-pirates who, like Baldridge, established pirate trading posts at Madagascar
