= 1692 in piracy =

See also 1691 in piracy, other events in 1692, 1693 in piracy, and Timeline of piracy.

== Events ==
=== Indian Ocean ===
- September - Danish seamen seize Mughal ships. The Mughal Empire holds the French, Dutch, and British East India Companies responsible and demands compensation.

=== Caribbean ===
- June 7 - An earthquake and resulting tsunami devastate Port Royal, Jamaica, a major buccaneer base.

=== North America ===
- April - George Raynor and his crew arrive in Charleston harbor with a stolen French ship containing large quantities of silver and gold.
- December - Thomas Tew obtains letter of marque from governor of Bermuda.

== Births ==
- September 11 - Ingela Gathenhielm
