= Thomas Henley =

Thomas Henley may refer to:

- Thomas Henley (Australian politician) (1860–1935), member of the New South Wales Legislative Assembly
- Thomas Henley (pirate), pirate and privateer active in the Red Sea and the Caribbean
- Thomas J. Henley (1810–1875), U.S. Representative from Indiana
