= Dirk Chivers =

Dutch pirate

Dirk Chivers (fl. 1694–1699, first name alternately Dick or Richard, last name occasionally Sievers or Shivers) was a Dutch pirate active in the Red Sea and Indian Ocean.

== Early career ==
Dirk Chivers claimed that "he belongeth to Hamburgh," and was first recorded as a crew member of the Portsmouth Adventure under Captain Joseph Faro (or Farrell) around January 1694. Soon after leaving Rhode Island, Chivers saw action in the Red Sea as Farrell, Henry Every, and everal others successfully captured two ships in June 1695 including Ganj-i-Sawai. On its return voyage to Rhode Island, Portsmouth Adventure ran aground on Mayotte in the Comoro Islands. Chivers stayed behind with several others while Farrell and the others continued on with Every.

== Chivers in the Red Sea & India ==
Chivers eventually signed aboard the 18-gun Resolution after being picked up by Captain Robert Glover near the end of the year. After several months in the Red Sea however, Chivers took part in a mutiny against Glover and had him and his 24 supporters placed onto the recently captured Arab ship Rajapura. Elected captain by the crew after the mutiny, he had the ship renamed the Soldado which, during the next year, was successful in capturing a number of valuable prizes before joining up with privateer John Hoar.

Together they captured, and subsequently ransomed, two East India Company ships. However, the ships were burned when the governor of Aden refused to pay the ransom. One of the captured sailors, a Captain Sawbridge, was said to have had his lips sewn shut with a sail needle in response to his constant complaining.

Chivers and Hoar sailed with four captured prizes into the harbour of Calcutta in November 1696, where they demanded a ransom of £10,000 for their release sending a message to the governor stating "We acknowledge no country, having sold our own, and as we are sure to be hanged if taken, we shall have no scruple in murdering and destroying if our demands are not granted in full."

The governor of Calcutta disregarded their threats and sent out ten ships against the privateers and, as they appeared in the harbor, Chivers and Hoar fled without their prizes (burning two of them) and made their way to Adam Baldridge's settlement at Saint Mary's Island for repairs (dismantling Thomas Tew's old ship Amity for parts and supplies after capturing it from Hoar's brother-in-law Richard Glover) arriving in the summer of 1697 where the two parted company as Hoar sailed for the Red Sea. Glover was still there and asked them to return to America; Chivers offered to let him aboard if he'd continue piracy of Moorish ships. Glover refused and Chivers left him there, where Glover was killed in a native uprising.

== Later career ==
In April 1698, Chivers captured an English ship, the Sedgwick, and struck a deal with the Sedgwick's captain: He would be allowed to keep his ship if he agreed to supplying the privateer's crew with rum.

In September, Chivers joined up with Robert Culliford (who had recently left William Kidd) and Joseph Wheeler with his quartermaster Nathaniel North. Together Chivers, Culliford, Wheeler, and North captured the Great Mohammed along with £130,000. Taking command of his new prize, the ship was renamed the New Soldado (or the Soldado II) and returned to Saint Mary's Island where they stayed at a settlement run by Edward Welch.

The following year, however, Chivers was forced to sink the New Soldado to block the harbor passage of Saint Mary's with the appearance of four British warships in September 1699. Despite his efforts, he and Culliford eventually accepted a royal pardon (under the 1698 Act of Grace, in spite of its expiration) and arranged passage home on the merchantman Vine. Several members of Chivers' crew returned to America separately, offering Giles Shelley large sums to take them as passengers aboard his ship Nassau.
