= Ralph Stout =

English pirate (died 1697)

Ralph Stout (died 1697) was a pirate active in the Indian Ocean. He is best known for rescuing fellow pirate Robert Culliford after each of them spent separate 4-year periods in Mughal Empire prisons.

== History ==
James Kelley had been a sailor aboard the Batchelor’s Delight with George Raynor and Edward Davis. In 1692 he was given command of the captured ship Unity but was arrested along with Ralph Stout and several others while ashore in India. They remained in prison until early 1696 when they stole a small boat and made their way to Bombay. There they signed aboard the East India Company ship Mocha under Captain Edgecombe. A few days later Stout led a mutiny, murdering Edgecombe and renaming the ship Defence (some records still refer to it as Mocha). Stout was elected Captain for his role in the mutiny.

Off of Burma they captured a ship with Robert Culliford’s crew aboard, who had only recently staged their own escape and mutiny. Near the Nicobar Islands, Stout picked up the rest of the crew and Culliford himself, who had been marooned when prisoners on Culliford's captured ship rebelled and ejected the pirates. Stout gained a reputation for cruelty, one occasion trapping prisoners in their ship and burning them alive, on another mutilating a captured Portuguese priest.

Later in 1696 Stout was sailing alongside Richard Bobbington and later John Ireland’s ship Charming Mary, looting a dozen ships. They separated soon after. Mocha attacked the East India Company ship Dorrill in early June 1697 but was repulsed with heavy casualties after Dorrill put up a stiff fight. Stout took the Mocha to the Laccadive Islands, where he was killed in the summer of 1697. Conflicting reports have him either slain by angry natives, or by his own crew when he announced he wanted to retire from piracy. Robert Culliford was given command of the Mocha after Stout's death, later sailing alongside Nathaniel North and Dirk Chivers, and meeting William Kidd.

== See also ==
- Richard Glover (pirate) - Former captain of the Charming Mary
- William May (pirate) - Future captain of the Charming Mary
