= James Kelly (pirate) =

English pirate (17th century)

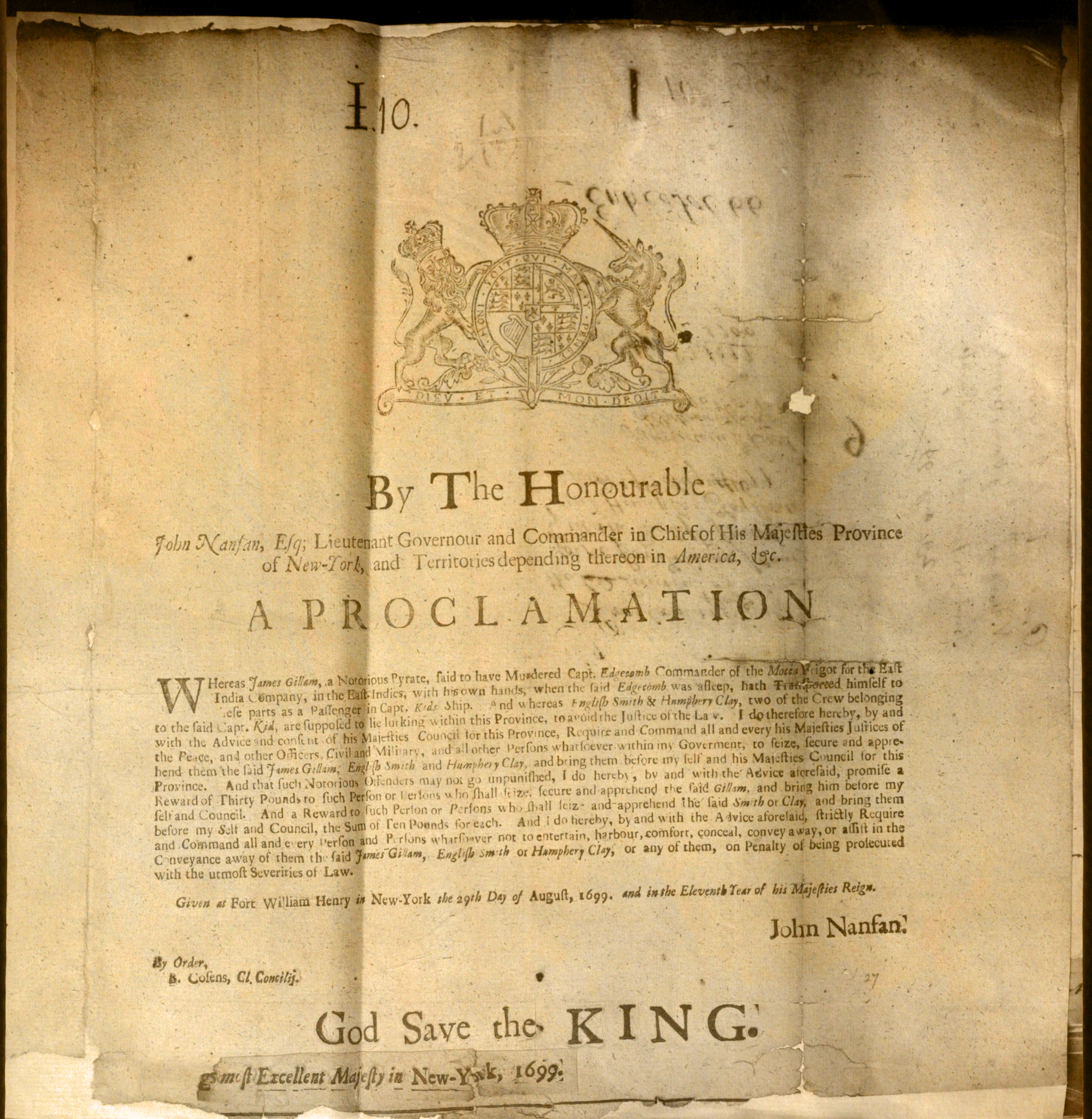
1699 Proclamation by John Nanfan, Lieutenant Governor of New York

James Gilliam, or James Kelly (Note: First name occasionally John, last name also Gillam or Kelley.) (before 1680 – 12 July 1701) was an English pirate and buccaneer active off the coasts of Spanish South and Central America and later in the Indian Ocean. He sailed under several different pirate captains but is best remembered for his brief association with William Kidd.

== History ==
Prior to his association with Kidd, he had been a sailor aboard merchant and privateer vessels since 1680, including stints under buccaneer John Cook and alongside John Eaton. Later he sailed as quartermaster under George Raynor aboard the Batchelor's Delight (Cook's former ship, now captained by Edward Davis). Captured while ashore with other sailors and officers after taking the East India ship Unity in 1691, Gilliam was imprisoned by Moghul authorities until 1696. Escaping to Bombay, Gilliam signed aboard the East Indiaman Mocha and soon led a mutiny which resulted in the murder of its captain. Aboard Mocha under successive captains Ralph Stout and Robert Culliford he assisted in the capture of several ships in the Indian Ocean. At St. Mary's off Madagascar Gilliam and a few others left Culliford to sail back to America with Kidd. Gilliam parted with Kidd at Delaware in mid-1699, taking his treasure chest ashore.

Gilliam was arrested after taking shelter in the home of Francis Dole, a fellow pirate who had once sailed with John Hoar. Suspecting that Gilliam had converted to Islam to serve the Great Moghul, officials examined him, and finding that he had been circumcised, confirmed their suspicions and imprisoned him. Governor Bellomont described Gilliam as “the most impudent, hardened villain I ever saw.”

Transported to Great Britain in 1700 alongside Kidd and Joseph Bradish, he was tried at the Old Bailey and found guilty of piracy. While in prison, he wrote "A full and true Discovery of all the Robberies, Pyracies, and other Notorious Actions, of that Famous English Pyrate, Capt. James Kelly" which, while attempting to rehabilitate his own reputation, also included references to the nearly unknown Galapagos Islands. Gilliam was hanged on 12 July 1701.

== See also ==
- William Dampier - Chronicler and navigator who sailed with Cook, Davis, and Eaton
