= John Thurber =

Pirate trader and slaver (1649–1717)

- Born: 1649
- Died: 1717 (aged 67–68)
- Occupations: Pirate trader and slaver
- Known for: Introducing rice to America as a staple crop and export commodity
- Piratical career
- Base of operations: Off Madagascar
- Commands: Charles

John Thurber (1649–1717, last name also Churcher) was a pirate trader and slaver active off Madagascar. He is best known for his role in introducing rice to America as a staple crop and export commodity.

== History ==
Thurber is primarily known for what may be an apocryphal event. In 1685, he was on a return voyage from Madagascar when his ship was damaged in a storm and blown off course. He put into Charleston for repairs where he met local doctor and explorer Henry Woodward. In exchange for Woodward’s hospitality and assistance, Thurber gave him a bag of seed rice from Madagascar. Woodward planted the rice, which flourished so well in the marshy Carolina soil that its production astounded the colonists. Within a few years rice became the colony’s primary crop and remained so into the modern era. Historians debate whether the story is true and point to other earlier introductions of rice to the area (“This has sparked the popular misconception that pirates brought Malagasay rice to the Americas.”), as well as analyses of rice cultivars pointing to West African rather than Malagasay origins. The story of Thurber’s involvement persists, and sparked a dramatic fictionalized account involving a stowaway and a doomed romance.

In 1687, near Campeche, he encountered pirate John Coxon, who forced him to take aboard several Indians, whom he ferried to New Providence until they could be returned to Jamaica. Thurber was named among other pirates such as Christopher Goffe and Thomas Woolerly who used islands in the Bahamas for water and supplies. His name also appears as a witness on New York merchant Andrew Browne’s deed that same year. Continuing his slave-trading voyages to Madagascar, he worked with another New York merchant, Frederick Philipse. He made a supply run in 1693 in Philipse’s 200-ton, 10-gun, 30-man brigantine Charles to Adam Baldridge’s pirate trading post at Ile ste Marie off Madacasgar, bringing in general goods and returning with slaves.

Baldridge kept extensive logs of his trade deals: “August 7th 1693. Arrived the Ship Charles, John Churcher master, from New York, Mr. Fred. Phillips, owner, sent to bring me severall sorts of goods. She had two Cargos in her, one Consigned to said Master to dispose of, and one to me, containing as followeth: 44 paire of shooes and pumps, 6 Dozen of worsted and threed stockens, 3 dozen of speckled shirts and Breaches, 12 hatts, some Carpenters Tools, 5 Barrells of Rum, four Quarter Caskes of Madera Wine, ten Cases of Spirits, Two old Stills full of hols, one worme, Two Grindstones, Two Cross Sawes and one Whip saw, three Jarrs of oyle, two small Iron Potts, three Barrells of Cannon powder, some books, Catechisms, primers and horne books, two Bibles, and some garden Seeds, three Dozen of howes, and I returned for the said goods 1100 pieces 8/8 and Dollers, 34 Slaves, 15 head of Cattel, 57 bars of Iron. October the 5th he set sail from St. Maries, after having sold parte of his Cargo to the White men upon Madagascar, to Mauratan to take in Slaves.”

The Charles itself would go on to serve under other captains, notably John Halsey during the War of Spanish Succession.

== See also ==
- Samuel Burgess, another pirate and trader who dealt with both Philipse and Baldridge.
