= Edward Antill (colonial politician) =

American winemaker

Edward Antill (June 17, 1701 – August 15, 1770) was a colonial plantation owner, attorney, and early politician in the Province of New Jersey. His early work in cultivating grapes and producing wine received an award of the Royal Society of Arts and makes him among the earliest winemakers in Britain's North American colonies.

== Early life ==
Antill was born on June 17, 1701, in New York City and was the son of attorney Edward Antill (1658-c. 1704). His father died when Edward was young and he would be raised by the pirate Giles Shelley. Shelley had been one of his father's clients, and the elder Edward had saved Shelley from execution for piracy.

His father had left young Edward large tracts of land at Piscataqua (now Piscataway Township, near New Brunswick, in Middlesex County, New Jersey). When Shelley died in 1710, Edward also inherited a large portion of his estate.

== Career ==
Edward was "remarkable for his eccentricities." He had served in the New Jersey colony's General Assembly in 1738, and was appointed by Governor Morris to the Provincial Council in 1741 and by Royal Governor Jonathan Belcher in 1746. He would serve on the Provincial Council until 1762.

In 1759, he was the superintendent of a lottery that intended to raise £1500 to complete Christ Church, the Episcopal church in New Brunswick. Antill served as a vestryman of Christ Church. He later gave £1800 toward founding King's College (now Columbia University) where his son Edward graduated in 1762.

=== Wine making ===
On December 2, 1767, the Royal Society of Arts awarded Antill a £200 prize that had been pending since 1758 challenging colonial landowners in North America to plant of vineyards and produce quality wine. The Society sought to award the first colonist who planted 500 vines of Vitus vinifera grapes and from them produced "five tuns of red or white wine of acceptable quality" that equalled "those Sorts of Wines now consumed in Great Britain." Antill had advised the society that on his estate in Piscataway he had planted 800 vines of Madeira, Burgundy and Frontinac [sic] grapes as well as a few "Sweet-water Grape vines, and of the best sort of the Native Vines of America by way of tryal."

In the last years of his life, Antill prepared an 80-page tract entitled "An Essay on the cultivation of the Vine, and the making and preserving of Wine, suited to the different Climates in North-America" which was published a year after his death in the Transactions of the American Philosophical Society. It was a "how-to" guide with the intention of disseminating to other colonial farmers the knowledge he had gained about cultivating grapes and producing wine. Antill was himself a member of the Society, having been elected to it in 1768.

== Personal life ==
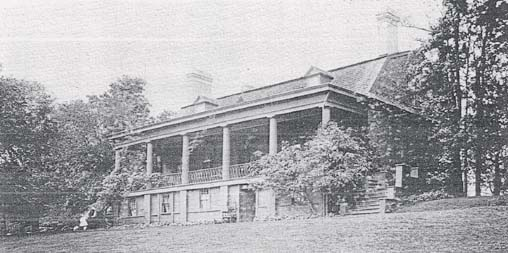
The Georgian-Dutch Colonial home of Edward Antill (later called Ross Hall) in Piscataway built 1739, destroyed 1954. Antill owned a 370-acre plantation with meadows, an orchard, and a vineyard of 800 vines for which he received an award from London's Royal Society of Arts in 1767.

On June 10, 1739, Edward Antill married Anne Morris (1706-1781), the daughter of Lewis Morris (1671-1746), the Royal Governor of New Jersey. There would be six children from this marriage, of which two sons who would serve as officers in Continental Army during the American Revolution. Their children included:

- Edward Antill (1742–1789), who married Charlotte Riverin in 1767.
- John Antill (1744–1816), who married Margaret Colden (c. 1748–1789), daughter of Alexander Colden. After Margaret's death, he married her younger sister, Jane Colden.

Edward Antill died on August 15, 1770, and buried the following day near the southeast corner of the churchyard at Christ Church in New Brunswick.

=== Residence ===
On his 370-acre plantation at Raritan Landing, he constructed a large home in the Georgian and Dutch Colonial style in 1739. This house, also known later as Ross Hall, was destroyed in 1954. The plantation consisted of an estimated 40 acres of meadow, 100 acres in timber, and a large orchard of 500 apple trees. He grew apples trees for a distillery on the site, and built a large brewhouse, 60-feet by 38 feet, with copper boiler pot holding 22 barrels.

== Works ==
- 1771: "An Essay on the cultivation of the Vine, and the making and preserving of Wine, suited to the different Climates in North-America" (published posthumously) in Transactions of the American Philosophical Society

== See also ==
- New Jersey wine
