= Matelot =

Matelot is a loanword from Middle French, meaning a sailor or seaman.

Matelot may also refer to:

- Matelot, Trinidad and Tobago
- Matelot River, Trinidad and Tobago
- Matelot (novel), by Pierre Loti
- "Matelot", a song by Noël Coward from the 1945 musical Sigh No More
- "Matelot", a song by the British group The Renegades

== See also ==
- Matelotage, a type of economic partnership practiced by buccaneers
- Matlow (disambiguation)
