= Edward Coates =

Edward Coates may refer to:

- Sir Edward Coates, 1st Baronet (1853–1921), British stockbroker and MP for Lewisham
- Edward Coates (pirate) (fl. 1690s), colonial American privateer in English service
- Edward Hornor Coates (1846–1921), Philadelphia businessman who commissioned The Swimming Hole

== See also ==
- Edouard Cortès (1882–1969), French post-Impressionist painter
