= Tempest Rogers =

Pirate trader

- Born: 1672
- Died: 1704 (aged 31–32)
- Occupation: Pirate trader
- Known for: Association with William Kidd
- Spouse: Johanna Little
- Piratical career
- Base of operations: Caribbean and off Madagascar

Tempest Rogers (1672 or 1675–1704) was a pirate trader active in the Caribbean and off Madagascar. He is best known for his association with William Kidd.

== History ==
Tempest Rogers was born in 1672 or 1675, and by 1693 had married Johanna Little in London. Three years later he was master of the Fidelia, sailing to the American colonies. He was suspected of sailing from Rhode Island to St. Mary's on Madagascar, which had long been a known pirate trading post. He may have sailed alongside another Rhode Island pirate, Thomas Wake, who was also bound for Madagascar and the Indian Ocean to eventually sail with Henry Every.

Rogers was dispatched from London in 1697 to the East Indies to set up a factory on behalf of the ship's owners; on the way back in July 1698 he stopped at St. Mary's again. While there William Kidd called on the port to switch his leaky Adventure Galley for his newly captured Quedagh Merchant, renamed to Adventure Prize. Rogers met with Kidd privately then offloaded troublesome crewman Edward Davis (or Davies), telling him he'd send a boat but putting to sea and abandoning Davis there instead. Davis sailed with Kidd rather than remain on Madagascar; once they returned to New York, he was arrested with the rest of Kidd's crew and sent to London for trial. Acquitted, Davis returned to piracy by 1702.

When Kidd sailed to the Caribbean on his way back to New York before his capture, he stopped to offload a great deal of his captured loot. Rogers apparently met with Kidd and bought or took possession of his plunder, possibly by prior arrangement. Rogers then traded the Fidelia to William Symes (or Syms) for Symes’ own sloop; after sailing north, Governor Bellomont of New York in 1699 seized the Fidelia on suspicion of carrying stolen goods. Bellomont thought Symes, a known criminal, may have murdered Rogers and stolen the Fidelia. Rogers himself had been seized by Governor Read Elding of the Bahamas, and revealed that he'd sent his London backers over £27,000. Bellomont observed, “Tempest Rogers, it’s to be feared, was not sent from London on an honest design.”

By the early 1700s Rogers was living in South Carolina, likely in Charleston. Rogers died sometime on or before 1704, when his widow Johanna married Richard Oglethorpe, a “broken rascally fellow … a person of a very scandalous life.” Oglethorpe wrote a letter to Secretary of State Charles Hedges (“An account of persons trading with pirates”) in which he repeated the accusations that Rogers had dealt with Kidd, naming others who he claimed had bought Kidd's goods from Rogers, and claiming Rogers had bought Dutch citizenship in order to trade with the French and Spanish as a neutral party, and that he had "since dyed amongst ye French." A few months later, Oglethorpe was granted administration of Rogers’ estate in South Carolina.

== See also ==
- Ralph Stout and Robert Culliford – Two other pirates associated with Kidd's time at Madagascar.
