= Edward Welch (pirate) =

Leader of a pirate settlement and trading post at Madagascar

Edward Welch (Note: Last name occasionally Welsh.) (died 1708) was best known for leading a pirate settlement and trading post at Madagascar.

== History ==
Adam Baldridge ran a well-known trading post on St. Mary’s Island off Madagascar in the 1690s, supplied by merchants such as New York’s Frederick Philipse. He escaped a slaughter in 1697 when Malagasy natives, angered by Baldridge’s slave-trading, attacked his settlement and killed many of the pirates who had been lodging there. Welch had been living on the island since 1691 and soon took over the trading post, adding prostitutes to the services he offered visiting pirates. Welch was known as “Little King;” a captured sailor described the fort as “inhabited by negroes under the command of Edward Welch, who came from New England thither when he was a boy.” Welch had “6 guns at his house, which have no command of the place where the shipping lie.” (Note: Implying that Welch was more concerned about another native uprising than with guarding the harbor against Royal Navy ships.)

William Kidd arrived in mid-1698 to find Robert Culliford in residence. Kidd’s crew mutinied and joined Culliford, and without enough men to crew his ships, Kidd and his remaining loyalists transferred to the captured Quedagh Merchant to return to New York. Kidd had been storing his treasure chest at Welch’s house; Culliford’s men ransacked the chest anyway. Smuggler Tempest Rogers bought some of the goods looted from Kidd’s ships. Rogers left ex-pirate Edward Davis behind; Welch helped Davis try to signal Rogers to return but to no avail, so Davis sailed back with Kidd. Welch traded liquor to the mutineers in exchange for Kidd’s bales of textiles.

Pirate-trader Giles Shelley also visited in 1698 and loaded his ship with “muslins and callicoes, spoilt by salt water, from one Edward Welsh, who hath lived for seven years in that island. The stuffs came from a wrecked ship, cast away at that place.” Shelley reported no sign of Kidd.

By Christmas 1698 Culliford and Dirk Chivers had returned and were living at Welch’s settlement along with John Swann. The stripped and partially sunken remains of Kidd’s Rouparelle (a.k.a. November) and Adventure Galley were still visible. The following year Chivers and others left the island with trader Samuel Burgess. Philipse had advised Burgess to ply Welch for good deals, “especially with liquor.”

Welch’s trading depot was never as successful as Baldridges’s. After being injured in a skirmish he served in the court of the Saklava King as a representative handling trade with Westerners. Illness and age took their toll and he died in 1708. The pirate trading post at St. Mary’s was revived by James Plantain in 1720.

== See also ==
- John Pro, Thomas Collins, and Abraham Samuel - Other pirate traders who ran trading posts on and near Madagascar.
