= Matelotage =

Partnership agreement between two sailors

Matelotage (French for "seamanship") was an agreement amongst pairs of European sailors, in particular buccaneers, in the 17th and early 18th century. As part of this economic partnership, "matelots" would agree to share their incomes, and inherit their partner's property in the case of their death. In addition, they would pledge to protect and fight alongside each other in battle and otherwise act in the other's interest. Not limited to sailors or pirates, matelotage agreements could be made by members of any group, even planters.

== Relationship ==
Alexandre Exquemelin wrote about the custom of pairs of sailors entering into economic agreements. Though most often interpreted as a platonic form of mutual insurance, some historians have compared matelotage to same-sex marriage or domestic partnership. B. R. Burg argued in Sodomy and the Pirate Tradition (1995) that in the male-dominated world of piracy, homosexuality was common. A union such as matelotage may have acted as a manner of validating relationships that would otherwise have been considered against contemporary societal norms. Another allusion to matelotage's significance was the disapproval it was shown by colonial authorities. Burg's conclusions and research methods are not accepted by most pirate historians. Hans Turley, who also wrote on pirates and homosexual unions, said "the evidence for piratical sodomy is so sparse as to be almost nonexistent." It is likely though that same-sex encounters were more accepted among buccaneers than in the Royal Navy, based on the lack of pirate articles against homosexuality.

== Examples ==
At least one written matelotage agreement survives in historical records; it was between two pirates residing at Port Dolphin on Madagascar in 1699. Other potential pirate matelotage unions such as that of John Swann and Robert Culliford, who were pirates in the Indian Ocean during the late 17th century, are sometimes described as romantic but are not referred to as matelotage in British records; Swann was instead referred to as "a great consort of Culliford's, who lives with him". However, consort was a nautical term for ships sailing together or aiding one another. There is no detailed information on Swann's relationship with Culliford beyond living and sailing together, so the issue of Swann and Culliford's sexual orientation remains open.
