= James Allison (pirate) =

James Allison (fl. 1689–1691) was a pirate and former logwood hauler, active near Cape Verde and the Bay of Campeche. Almost the entire record of Allison's piracy comes from trial records of a single incident, the seizure of the merchantman Good Hope.

== History ==
The 300-ton, 22-gun trader Good Hope had been renamed from the Fortune of Courland, which had escaped Boston under suspicion of evading customs laws: in October 1689 the ship was seized, but the sailor put aboard to monitor the ship was thrown overboard. They sailed to Amsterdam later that year; by late January 1691 the Good Hope under Captain Jeremiah Tay arrived at Mayo in the Cape Verde islands to collect salt. In early February they were met by a 35-man sloop flying English flags. The visitor was Captain James Allison who claimed to be from New York, sailing out of South Carolina with a privateering commission against the French.

A year earlier, Allison had been cutting logwood in the Bay of Campeche. Tay had met him then, purchasing some of his logwood, and being sociable with Allison and his crew: “during our stay there [Allison] kept amicable correspondance with us, Eateing, Drinking and Lodging frequently on board our said Shipp,” and Tay had kept the Good Hope close for the additional protection of Allison's guns. Because he was familiar with Allison, and because Tay's English-flagged ship would have been prey for French privateers if caught alone, Tay let him aboard again to drink converse, and let his men visit Allison's ship.

Thinking himself secure, Tay sent all his men ashore to collect salt. Allison and a few others went aboard Tay's ship to visit, but claimed his doctor had locked the cupboard before leaving, preventing them from making punch (sugared liquor). He sent some men to Tay's ship to fetch the keys from the doctor. As soon as Allison's men arrived they seized Tay's weapons and signaled Allison to capture Tay and his officers.

Allison emptied his own sloop, leaving behind only “a Little Stincking Brackish water, some Flower, a Little Stincking beefe, and three or foure baggs of wheate”. He and his crew took the Good Hope, retrieving Tay's men from ashore and putting most of them on Allison's looted sloop. A few of Tay's men joined Allison, and had reportedly been part of the plot from the beginning. Tay testified that the pirates threatened to torture him for the location of the ship's money.

Tay and his men made it back to Barbados later that February and delivered a deposition to the court in March regarding Allison's actions. Allison sailed around the Cape of Good Hope to Madagascar to sell off the merchandise from Tay's hold but never made it. The Good Hope was lost near St. Augustine; pirate Edward Coates picked up their crew and dropped off 30 of them at Adam Baldridge's pirate trading post near Madagascar. By 1694 some of Allison's crew were back in Boston, having been arrested on Long Island and charged with piracy, likely after traveling back with Coates, who left Madagascar for New York in December 1692, or with Samuel Burgess and William May, who had given his ship to Coates shortly before. They were tried in Massachusetts’ Superior Court because there was no formal Admiralty Court in the colony at the time. It is not recorded whether Allison survived the wreck of the Good Hope; his ultimate fate is unknown.

== See also ==
- John James - Another pirate who wrecked while sailing to Madagascar, and whose crew was rescued by fellow pirates.
