= James Allison =

James Allison or Jim Allison may refer to:

- James Allison (pirate) (fl. 1689–1691), pirate active near Cape Verde and the Bay of Campeche
- James Allison Jr. (1772–1854), member of the U.S. House of Representatives from Pennsylvania
- James Whidden Allison (1795–1867), Nova Scotia politician
- James Allison (theatre) (1831–1890), Australian theatre manager
- James Allison (Wisconsin politician) (1858–?), Wisconsin politician
- James Edward Allison (1870–1955), American architect with Allison & Allison
- James A. Allison (1872–1928), American inventor and businessman
- Barney Allison (James Barnett Allison, 1880–1907), Irish rugby union player
- Jim Allison (American football) (born 1943), American football player
- James P. Allison (born 1948), American immunologist and Nobel laureate
- James Allison (motorsport) (born 1968), English engineer

== Characters ==
- James Allison (Robert E. Howard), a character created by Robert E. Howard

== See also ==
- James Alison (architect) (1862–1932), Scottish architect
- James Alison (born 1959), Catholic priest, theologian and author
