= 1693 in piracy =

Events that place in 1693 in piracy.

== Events ==
=== Indian Ocean ===
- Autumn - Thomas Tew's sloop Amity captures large Mughal vessel near strait of Bab-el-Mandeb.

== See also ==
- 1692 in piracy
- 1693
- 1694 in piracy
- Timeline of piracy
