= Edward Antill (attorney) =

American merchant and lawyer

Edward Antill (March 20 1658/1659–bef. April 7, 1725) was an English-born American merchant and attorney prominent in the early history of the Province of New York and the Province of New Jersey during the colonial period. He was the father of colonial politician and plantation owner Edward Antill (1701–1770) and grandfather of Lt. Colonel Edward Antill (1742–1789) who served as an officer in the Continental Army notably at the Battle of Quebec (1775).

Antill was born on 20 March 1658/1659 in Richmond, County Surrey, England. Antill rose to prominence as an attorney and a merchant importing goods and slaves from the West Indies in the late seventeenth century. In the 1680s Antill was apparently opposed to the administration of New York and New Jersey under the Dominion of New England, and to its administrator, Sir Edmund Andros, as Antill had considerable connections with Jacob Leisler, who later overthrew the Andros government and deposed Francis Nicholson, Andros's Lieutenant Governor during Leisler's Rebellion in 1689. Leisler appointed Antill to his provincial council, but Antill was forced to flee after facing arrest for this involvement with Leisler. The hostilities between Antill and Andros originated years earlier. Andros had previously charged and tried Philip Carteret, the first governor of New Jersey in 1677 for riot—a trial in which Antill participated in some capacity. The trial was political in nature, as Carteret refused to give up his position as governor when demanded by Edmund Andros, Governor of New York. In response, Andros sent a raiding party to Carteret's home and had him beaten and arrested. He was acquitted at trial, but the attack caused permanent injuries that led to his death in 1682. Antill was close to Carteret in the colony's affairs, and later inherited a significant portion of the estate of Carteret's widow.

On November 20, 1686, he purchased one quarter of a one-twenty-fourth part of the East Jersey colony from David Toshack, the Laird of Monibaird. This propriety interest formerly belonged to James, Earl of Perth. Antill was among the proprietors who signed the documents surrendering East Jersey to the Crown in preparation for Queen Anne's uniting East Jersey and West Jersey into a Crown colony in 1702.

His exact date of death is not known as his will was written in 1704 but not probated until 1725. It is thought that he died when his son Edward (1701–1770) was young, due to his son's adoption by pirate Giles Shelley. It is thought because of his name disappears from the legal history of New Jersey and New York that Antill died in or shortly after 1704.
