= 1695 in piracy =

Events that took place in 1695 in piracy.

== Events ==
=== Indian Ocean ===
- September
  - After pursuing a 25-ship Mughal convoy through the Mandab Strait, Captain Thomas Tew and the Amity overtook one of the Mughal ships, the Fateh Muhammed, and attacked the vessel. Although taking the Mughal ship by surprise, Tew himself was killed while attempting to board the ship. Upon witnessing the death of their Captain, who had reportedly been disemboweled by a cannon shot, his crew surrendered to the Mughals and remained captives until their rescue by Captain Henry Every that same month.
  - Henry Every's Fancy (previously Charles II) captures Mughal ships Fateh Muhammed and Ganj-I-Sawai. Freeing the surviving members of Tew's crew, pirates rape and murder large numbers of those aboard and steal cargo worth more than £325,000.

== Deaths ==
- September - Thomas Tew, pirate captain
