= John Leadstone =

18th century pirate and slaver

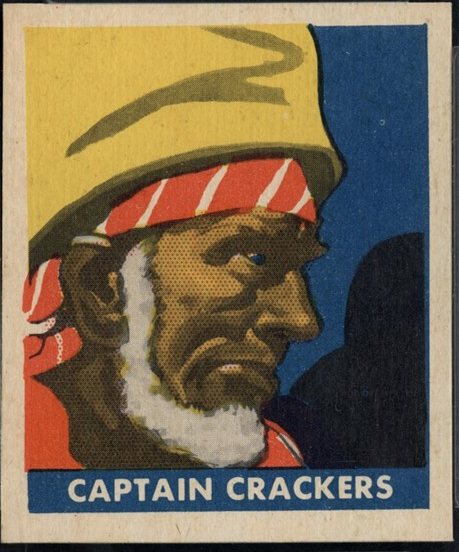
Captain Crackers from the 1948 Leaf Pirate Trading Cards set

John Leadstone (fl. 1704 – c. 1721) was a pirate and slaver active off the west coast of Africa. Often called “Captain Crackers” or “Old Captain Cracker,” he is best known for his actions against the English Royal African Company and for his brief involvement with Bartholomew Roberts.

== History ==
Leadstone was hired by the Royal African Company in the early 1700s at their factory on Bunce Island at the mouth of the Sierra Leone River. He soon deserted, stealing over a thousand bars of iron, and helped pilot a French force upriver in 1704 which bombarded the Bunce factory. Captured by natives after he began illicitly trading on his own, he was freed by the Portuguese, whom he served for a time. The Portuguese Governor at Cacheo (in Gambia) gave him a trading mission but Leadstone repeated his earlier tactics: he stole the trade goods, murdered a man, and escaped to Sierra Leone.

He passed the time raiding ashore from small boats, in one 1715 incident stealing slaves from a local settlement. Later he would be described as “formerly a noted Buccaneer, and while he followed the Calling, robb'd and plundered many a Man.” He gained his “Old Cracker” nickname after he moved to Whiteman's Bay, just down the river from Bunce Island. He kept his vessels – several small boats and a periagua - as well as native slaves and servants, and welcomed pirates who came to trade. Captain Charles Johnson wrote that Leadstone “keeps the best House in the Place, has two or three Guns before his Door, with which he Salutes his Friends, (the Pyrates, when they put in) and lives a jovial Life with them, all the while they are there.” Another writer described him in glowing terms: “He was the soul of hospitality and good fellowship, and kept open-house for all pirates, buccaneers, and privateersmen.”

Leadstone was among at least 30 former pirates who traded goods to passing ships in need of resupply. They also supplied slaves and ivory to merchants who avoided the Royal African Company's trading monopoly. At least one of the slaves Leadstone sold, a man named Tomba, led an unsuccessful mutiny aboard a Bristol slave ship in 1721.

Bartholomew Roberts arrived off the Guinea coast in June 1721. He visited Leadstone, who warned him that the Royal Navy warships HMS Swallow and HMS Weymouth were in the vicinity on a mission to stamp out piracy. Leadstone cautioned Roberts that the naval vessels were expected back by Christmas, and Roberts planned his route accordingly. Unknown to either of them, sickness among their crews caused the two Navy ships to put in at nearby Cape Coast Castle instead; sailing out in February 1722, they captured Roberts’ fellow captains James Skyrme and Thomas Sutton and after a brief battle at sea, killed Roberts himself.

== In popular culture ==
Two fictional novels about Golden Age pirates, in which Leadstone makes an appearance:

- “The Watchers” by Alfred Edward Woodley Mason (1924) (full text available free online)
- “Cross of Fire” by Mark Keating (2013)

== See also ==
- Adam Baldridge and Abraham Samuel and James Plaintain, three other ex-pirates who established trading posts off the African coast
