= Christopher Goffe =

17th-century pirate and privateer

- Occupations: Pirate and privateer
- Years active: 1683–1691
- Criminal charge: Piracy
- Criminal penalty: Pardoned
- Piratical career
- Base of operations: Red Sea and the Caribbean
- Later work: Hunting down his former comrades

Christopher Goffe (fl. 1683–1691) was a pirate and privateer active in the Red Sea and the Caribbean. He was eventually trusted to hunt down his former comrades.

== History ==
Thomas Henley departed Boston for the Red Sea in 1683 alongside Thomas Woolerly and Christopher Goffe. Successful, they returned to the Caribbean the following year. In May 1685 Goffe and Henley arrived in Bermuda with a Dutch prize ship. Governor Coney tried to have Henley arrested but his own citizens and soldiers refused to prosecute him and Coney was forced to release Henley. Though Henley had a privateering commission from Governor Lilburne of the Bahamas, the governments of Jamaica and New York publicly proclaimed both Henley and Goffe to be pirates. Goffe was prolific enough in the area that a small island was named for him, known as Goff's Caye; another nearby island was named for pirate Joseph Bannister.

Woolerly sailed to New Providence in June 1687 asking to resupply. He announced that he had Goffe aboard, having taken him in when he was in dire need of assistance. Because Goffe had been named as a pirate, Woolerly was denied entrance, despite having his own commission from Lilburne. Instead Woolerly left and sailed to Andrews Island where he burned his ship, shared out his loot, and purchased another vessel to return to New England.

Goffe made his way to Boston, and “in a very sick and weak condition” asked for and received a pardon for his piracies in late 1687. Goffe, members of Henley's crew, and others admitted to having been pirates, but were not prosecuted for lack of evidence and witnesses, and were allowed to keep their treasure.

By August 1691 Goffe had been commissioned as a privateer by Massachusetts Governor Simon Bradstreet. Assigned to patrol Cape Cod and Cape Ann, he was tasked with bringing in pirates George Dew and Thomas Griffin. They outpaced Goffe's Swan, sailing “two feet to our one,” and Goffe gave up the chase. By 1696 he had retired to Boston where he ran a mercer's shop using the proceeds from his career of piracy.

== See also ==
- Pirate Round – later name for the voyage from America to the coast of Africa, then to the Indian Ocean via Madagascar, a route refined by pirate Thomas Tew.
