= Matlow =

Matlow is a surname. Notable people with the surname include:

- Josh Matlow (born 1975), Canadian politician
- Jeff Matlow, American founder of Crank! Records
- Swizzels Matlow, English confectioner established by Maurice and Alfred Matlow

== See also ==
- Matelot (disambiguation)
