= Edward Antill (soldier) =

American soldier

- Born: April 11, 1742; Piscataway, Province of New Jersey, British America
- Died: May 29, 1789 (aged 47); Saint-Jean, Canada
- Spouse: Charlotte Riverin (1753–1785)
- Relatives: John Antill (brother); Edward Antill (father); Edward Antill (grandfather); Lewis Morris (grandfather)
- Military career
- Branch: Continental Army
- Service years: 1775–1783
- Rank: Colonel (military engineer)
- Unit: 2nd Canadian Regiment
- Conflicts: American Revolutionary War; Battle of Quebec; Battle of Staten Island; Battle of Yorktown

Lieutenant Colonel Edward Antill (April 11, 1742 – May 29, 1789) was an American soldier from New Jersey who served in the Continental Army during the American Revolutionary War. He is known for his actions during the Invasion of Quebec in 1775–76.

== Background and early years ==
Coat of Arms of Edward Antill

Antill was born on April 11, 1742, in Piscataway ("Piscataqua"), Province of New Jersey. He was the fourth of six children born to Edward Antill (1701–1770), a colonial plantation owner, attorney, and early politician in New Jersey, and Anne Morris (1706–1781). His maternal grandfather was Lewis Morris (1671–1746), Royal Governor of New Jersey, and his paternal grandfather was Edward Antill (c. 1659–1725), an English-born merchant and attorney.

In 1762, Antill graduated from King's College (now Columbia University) in New York City.

On May 4, 1767, Antill married Charlotte Riverin of Quebec City. They had six children. Antill was a member and Past Master of St. John’s Masonic Lodge. He was active in Freemasonry, having served as the first Deputy Grand Master for the District of Montreal, having been appointed to that office in 1767 by the Provincial Grand Lodge of Quebec.

== Military career ==
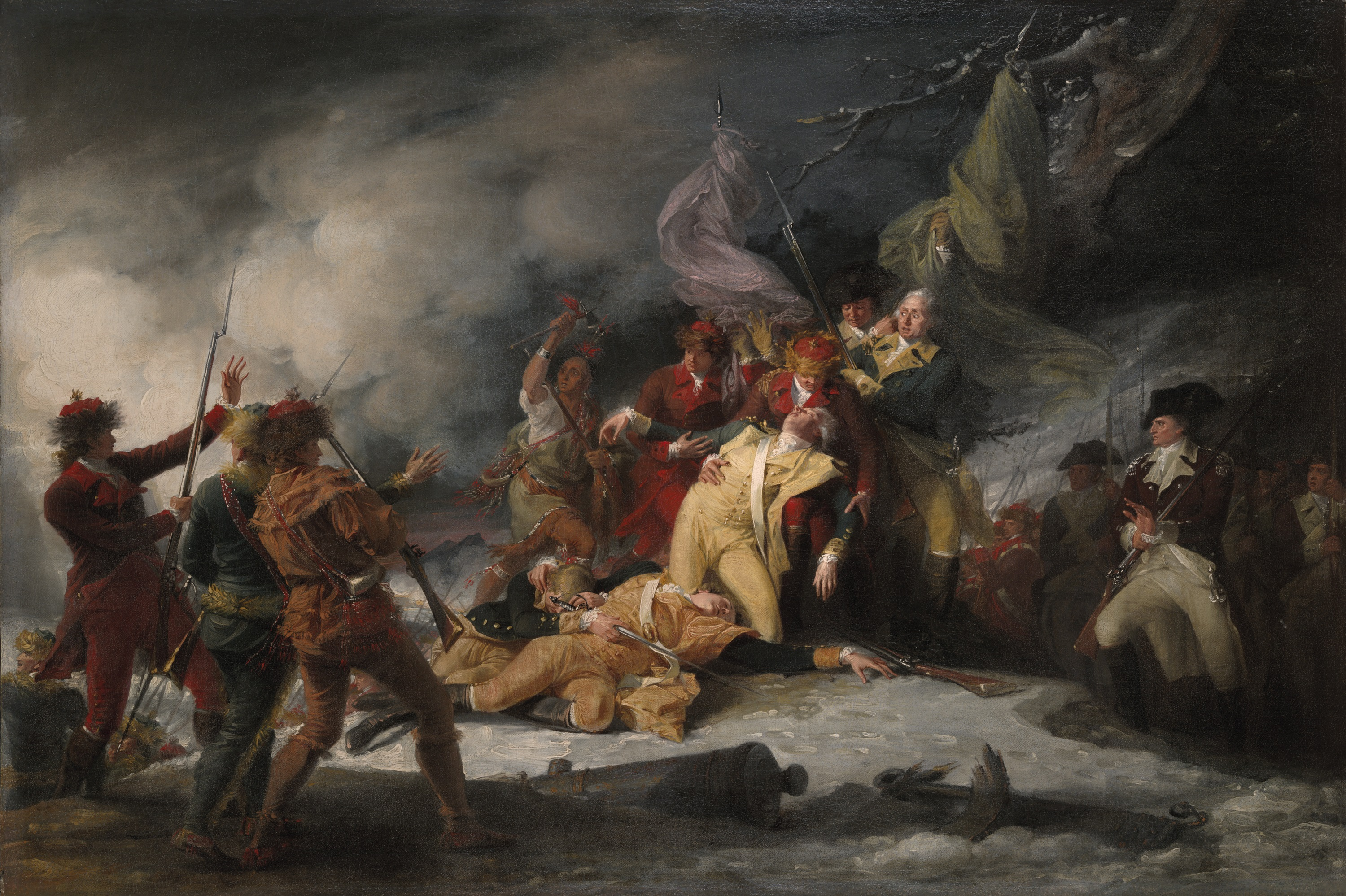
The Death of General Montgomery in the Attack on Quebec, December 31, 1775 by John Trumbull, 1786.

Antill was an American colonist living in the city of Quebec when in 1775 he joined the 2nd Canadian Regiment (also known as Congress' Own Regiment), as an engineer. He participated in the Battle of Quebec under General Richard Montgomery, and was present when Montgomery died from wounds received in the battle on December 31, 1775.

After the failed attack on Quebec, Antill was sent to the Continental Congress in Philadelphia.

In August 1777, Antill was taken prisoner at the second Battle of Staten Island, so he was not with his regiment at the Battle of Brandywine. He remained on a prison ship on the Hudson River for three years.

Upon his release, he followed and rejoined the 2nd Canadian Regiment at Yorktown.

== Later years and death ==
After the Revolutionary War, Antill soon fell upon hard times, and he suffered a breakdown after the death of his wife Charlotte in 1785. In 1787, he left his youngest child, two-year-old Frances (Fanny) Antill, in the care of Alexander Hamilton (who was then a lawyer in New York City) and his wife Elizabeth:

Colonel Antil [sic] of the Canadian Corps, a friend of General Hazen, retired penniless from the service—his military claims, a sole dependence, being unsatisfied. Hoping to derive subsistence from the culture of a small clearing in the forest, he retired to the wilds of Hazenburgh. His hopes were baffled, and in his distress he applied to Hamilton for relief. His calamities were soon after embittered by the loss of his wife, leaving infant children. With one of these Antil visited New York, to solicit the aid of the Cincinnati, and there sank under the weight of his sorrows. Hamilton immediately took the little orphan home, who was nurtured with his own children...

Two years later, on May 23, 1789, Antill died in Canada at Saint-Jean, near Montréal.

Fanny continued to live with the Hamiltons for another eight years, until she was twelve, at which time her older sister Mary was married and able to take Fanny into her own home. Later, James Alexander Hamilton would write that Fanny "was educated and treated in all respects as [the Hamiltons'] own daughter." She later married Arthur Tappan, a prosperous merchant and abolitionist.
