= Thomas Henley (pirate) =

- Piratical career
- Type: Privateer
- Years active: 1683–1685
- Base of operations: Red Sea, Caribbean

Thomas Henley (Note: Last name also Handley.) (fl. 1683–1685) was a pirate and privateer active in the Red Sea and the Caribbean.

== History ==
Henley set out from Boston in 1683 alongside Christopher Goffe and Thomas Woolerly (or Wollervy), sailing for the Red Sea to plunder Arab ships off the Malabar coast. Some of Henley’s crew left his ship while in the Indian Ocean, sailing back to the Caribbean and then to New England with Woolerly. They were tried for piracy (which they openly admitted) but were acquitted for lack of evidence and witnesses, and were allowed to keep their treasure.

By 1684 he was back in the Caribbean, where buccaneer and privateer Bartholomew Sharp captured him and took his 18-gun, 100-man frigate Resolution, renaming it Josiah. Henley’s ship was formerly called Valdivia when Henley captured it from the Spanish. Sharp was accused of piracy for taking Henley’s ship without presenting it to an Admiralty Court for confirmation, but he was acquitted.

The following year Henley and Goffe put in at Bermuda in possession of a Dutch prize ship, taken on a privateering commission from Governor Lilburne of the Bahamas. Bermudan Governor Coney imprisoned Henley and tried to seize the ship, but everyone from the local militia leaders to the sheriff to the Governor’s own Council members resisted prosecuting Henley and Coney was forced to release him. Coney lamented that “it is the intention of the people to make this island a pirates’ refuge.” Henley was afterwards pronounced a pirate by the government of Jamaica, and warned Cony that more pirates were coming. There are few records of his subsequent activities.

== See also ==
- Pirate Round – later name for the voyage from America to the coast of Africa, then to the Indian Ocean via Madagascar, a route refined by pirate Thomas Tew.
