= John Swann (pirate) =

17th-century pirate active near Madagascar

John Swann (active 1698–1699, first name also Jon, possibly also referred to as "Paul Swan") was a minor pirate in the Indian Ocean, known almost entirely for speculation about his relationship with Robert Culliford.

== History ==
Swann had been captured with Culliford near Mangalore, spending four years imprisoned with him until their 1696 escape. In late 1698 Swann was living at Edward Welch's settlement on Île Ste. Marie ("St. Mary's Island") off northeastern Madagascar with fellow Captain Robert Culliford, who is occasionally cited as a bisexual or homosexual pirate. While there, Swann was referred to as "a great consort of Culliford's, who lives with him".

Consort was the naval term for a sister ship, ship's tender, or for two allied vessels sailing the same course; there was also a custom among pirates and sailors in general called "matelotage" (from the French for "seamanship"), which was sometimes referred to as "consortship". Some writers argue that matelotage was effectively same-sex marriage, while others maintain it was primarily non-sexual and was more akin to a civil partnership: an agreement to share goods and wealth, survivor's benefits if one partner died, and so forth. Written matelotage agreements were rare, and there is no detailed information on Swann's actual relationship with Culliford beyond that of sailing in consort and living together, and so the issue remains open.

In 1699, a number of Culliford's crew left his ship Resolution (actually Ralph Stout's Mocha, renamed) and stayed in Madagascar, paying merchant ships to return them to America. Among them were Otto Van Tuyl and a "Paul Swan". This may have been John Swann, though some depositions recorded him as still on the island. Culliford had left Île Ste Marie to cruise in the Red Sea and Indian Ocean again; he invited Swann to join him in returning to piracy at sea, but Swann declined. Later, when Culliford accepted a pardon offered to the Madagascar pirates, Swann accepted as well. Swann made his way back to Barbados but decided not to follow Culliford any further; Culliford was eventually arrested and sent to London for trial, where his testimony against Samuel Burgess helped him gain his freedom.

== See also ==
- Cohabitation and civil union – Two alternative forms of modern non-marriage living arrangements.
