= B. R. Burg =

American historian

- Occupation: Historian
- Writing career
- Period: 1976 - 2007
- Subjects: Homosexuality, maritime studies
- Notable works: An American Seafarer in the Age of Sail (1994); Gay Warriors (1996); Boys at Sea (2007)

B. R. Burg is an American historian, professor and author. He is the author of Boys at Sea (2007), a book that examines the prevalence of homosexuality among Royal Navy mariners from about 1790 to 1820, mostly examining cases between marine officers and younger boys. He also wrote An American seafarer in the Age of Sail (1994), a biography of nineteenth-century American sailor Philip C. Van Buskirk, and is the author of Gay Warriors (1996), which documents the history of homosexuality in the military within a period of about 2,000 years.

== Bibliography ==
- Richard Mather of Dorchester (1976)
- An American Seafarer in the Age of Sail: The Erotic Diaries of Philip C. Van Buskirk, 1851-1870 (1994)
- Gay Warriors: A Documentary History from the Ancient World to the Present (1996)
- 'Boys at Sea': Sodomy, Indecency, and Courts Martial in Nelson's Navy (2007)
