= 1690 in piracy =

== Events ==
=== North America ===
- The English East India Company is forced to temporarily cease operations due to increased activity by English pirates.
- January 13 - Captain Thomas Pound, after being captured with his crew the previous month, is tried in Boston, Massachusetts, and found guilty of piracy although he is later reprieved. Thomas Hawkins, an officer under Captain Pound, is also found guilty and similarly given a reprieve. Later sent to England, he is killed during a fight with a French privateer.
- January 27 - William Coward, after seizing the ketch Elenor anchored in Boston Harbor the previous year, is hanged for acts of piracy following his capture (two of his officers, Christopher Knight and Thomas Storey, are also found guilty, however they are later reprieved). He is executed alongside Thomas Johnson, known as the "limping privateer" who was wounded in the jaw during the fight at Tarpaulin Cove where he was captured with Captain Pound and several others.

== Deaths ==
- Thomas Hawkins, Boston pirate and officer under Captain Pound
- January 27 - William Coward, Boston pirate
