= Giles Shelley =

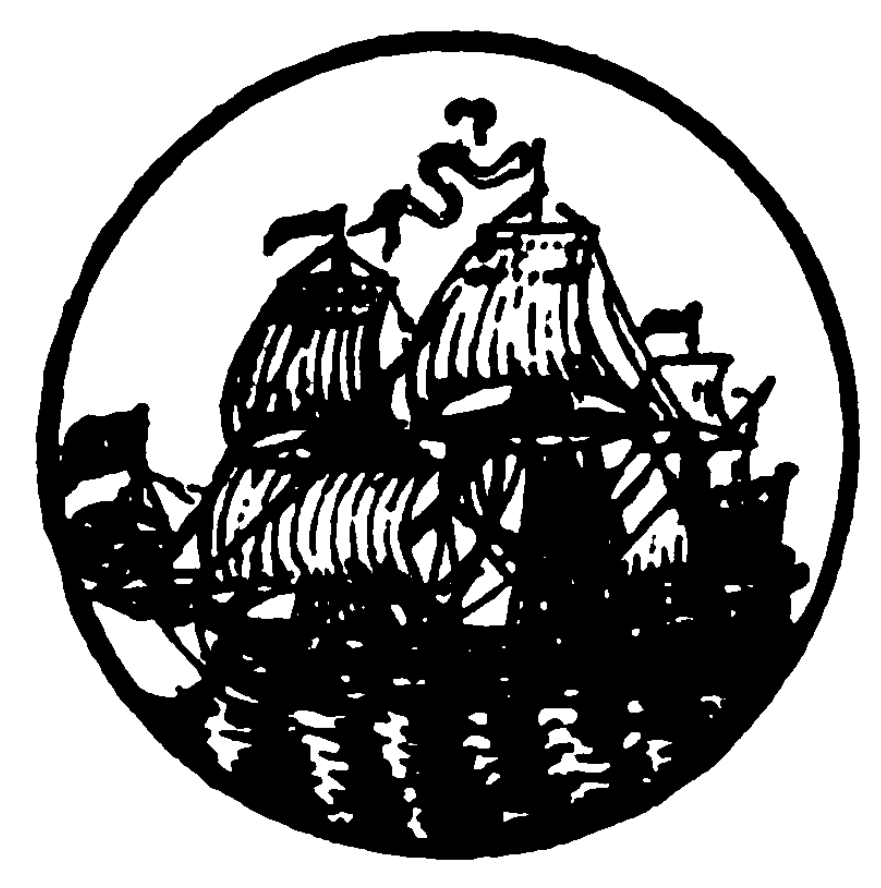
Engraving of the pirate trading vessel 'Nassau' captained by Giles Shelley; taken from a silver tankard presented to Shelley upon his return from a 1698-1699 trading voyage between New York and the pirates of Madagascar.

Giles Shelley (born May 1645 (?), died 1710, last name occasionally Shelly) was a pirate trader active between New York and Madagascar.

== History ==
Shelley commanded the 4-gun or 6-gun vessel Nassau (Note: Royal Navy records show a “Giles Shelley” granted command of the ship Providence in 1659; it is unknown whether this was the same person who later captained the Nassau and traded with pirates, though this is unlikely as it would make Shelley quite old by the time of his pirate trading.) on supply runs between New York and the pirate trading posts of Madagascar, including Ile Ste.-Marie. He delivered goods in demand by pirates such as gunpowder and alcohol, returning with slaves as well as merchandise stolen from East India Company ships. Backed by New York merchants such as Stephen Delancey, the voyages were immensely profitable: a pipe of Madeira wine bought for £19 in the American colonies sold for £300 on Madagascar. Despite not engaging in direct piracy of his own, Shelley's trips were not always safe: in 1696 pirates who had come aboard posing as merchants robbed the Nassau.

His best-known voyage took place in early 1698, one that made his backers over £30,000. With Delancey's investment he made the usual trip around Africa to Madagascar and sold his cargo. For the return trip in December he took aboard over fifty pirates who wanted to retire in New England, each of which paid for their passage in captured gold. Many of the pirates had sailed under Dirk Chivers, Robert Culliford, or William Kidd. Among the pirates he carried were Otto Van Tuyl and Paul Swan. Culliford sent a treasure chest back with Shelley along with a letter addressed to the widow of one of his crew, explaining that the gold was her late husband's share of their loot.

After a brief stop at Cayenne to drop off some of the pirates, he sailed back to Cape May in early 1699. Several pirates trying to avoid authorities were put ashore there, while a sloop met the Nassau at sea and took aboard several more who wanted to avoid New York entirely. Shelly beached the Nassau to offload the rest of the pirates and crew and their treasure. Many of the transported pirates were arrested by local authorities; New Jersey Governor Jeremiah Basse personally boarded a sloop to apprehend a group of them, though New York's Governor Bellomont later accused him of having taken bribes to let them go.

While offshore Shelley wrote a letter to Delancey detailing the voyage, a letter which was seized by authorities attempting to arrest the pirates:

Giles Shelley to Mr. Delencie, or, in his absence, Mr. John Barbarie in New York. Cape May, May 27, 1699. At St. Mary's in Madagascar I sold the goods for muslin, calicoes, a ton of elephants' teeth and 2 or 3 cwt. of opium. I took on board 75 passengers: 24 went ashore at Fort Dolphin, where I bought a few negroes and some pigs of tooth and egg. (Note: "Pigs" meaning metal ingots; "tooth and egg" is "tutenag," a term for Zinc used in India. Meaning, "bars of zinc.") Most of the passengers design for Virginia and Horekills with Andrew Graverard. I have for their passages about 12,000 pieces of eight and about 3,000 Lyon dollars. I hear there is no man-of-war at New York, and design to come to Sandy Hook. Capt. Burgess arrived at St. Mary's the day I sailed, and sold his goods very well. Signed, Giles Shelley. (Note: This is an edited version of Shelley's letter from the Calendar of State Papers; the full letter is substantially the same.)

Bellomont had Shelley arrested and accused of piracy. Through his lawyer Edward Antill, Shelley was released on bail then cleared of all charges. Shelley went on to become a respected merchant in New York and purchased a number of properties in the state. He was married but had no children, adopting Anthill's son after the elder Antill died. Shelley died in 1710, leaving a great deal of land and money to his adopted son as well as various friends and relatives; his widow died in 1718. (Note: Edward Antill named Shelley as executor of his estate in his will but Shelley probably predeceased him: Antill disappeared from Colonial records in 1704 and may have died near that date, though his will was not proved until 1725, so his date of death is uncertain.)

== See also ==
- Samuel Burgess and Thomas Mostyn – two other New York-based ship captains employed in trading with the pirates of Madagascar
