= Thomas Woolerly =

17th century pirate and privateer

Thomas Woolerly (Note: First name sometimes given as William, last name occasionally Woolery, Wooley, Wollerly or Woollervy.) (fl. 1683–1687) was a pirate and privateer active in the Caribbean and the Indian Ocean.

== History ==
Woolerly set out from Boston in 1683 alongside Christopher Goffe and Thomas Henley, headed for the Red Sea to plunder Arab and Malabar ships. By 1684 they had returned to the Caribbean, where Goffe and Henley appeared with a Dutch prize ship. Henley was arrested after they were declared to be pirates, despite having a privateering commission from Governor Lilburne of the Bahamas, but was soon released.

In May 1687 Woolerly sailed to New Providence with Goffe aboard in a 40-gun Dutch East India vessel, but they were accused of piracy and refused permission to resupply, though Woolerly also had a commission from Lilburne. Woolerly sailed away, purchasing a small ship and burning the Dutch vessel near Andrew's Island before dividing his pirated loot and leaving the area. Governor Molesworth of Jamaica dispatched HMS Drake in August to capture Woolerly; Drake detoured to search for a pirate named Bear and consequently missed Woolerly, who was suspected to have returned to New England. Woolerly subsequently vanished along with his treasure.

== See also ==
- Pirate Round – later name for the voyage from America to the coast of Africa, then to the Indian Ocean via Madagascar, a route refined by pirate Thomas Tew.
