= John Hoar (pirate) =

Pirate in the 1690s in the Red Sea

John Hoar (died 1697, last name occasionally Hoare or Hore) was a pirate and privateer active in the late 1690s in the Red Sea area.

== History ==
Hoar and his frigate Dublin had been granted a privateering commission from Governor Sir William Beeston of Jamaica, and near Canada had taken a 200-ton, 14-gun French prize called St. Paul. In January 1694 he convinced the Rhode Island General Assembly to convene an Admiralty Court and award him the prize so he could swap vessels, renaming the ship John and Rebecca. He then purchased a second privateering commission from Governor Benjamin Fletcher of New York. Fletcher later claimed no knowledge of Hoar's piracy, despite having previously granted a commission to Hoar's own brother-in-law Richard Glover, also a privateer-turned-pirate.

The John and Rebecca sailed for the Cape of Good Hope and the Persian Gulf in December 1695. It was during this voyage that Abraham Samuel was elected ship's quartermaster. After some navigation trouble they put in at Adam Baldridge’s pirate trading post at St. Augustine in Madagascar until April 1696. Before leaving for the Red Sea they picked up some of the surviving crew from Thomas Wake’s Susanna; Wake and a number of his crew had taken sick and died of illness a short while earlier.

Hoar sailed alongside Dutch pirate Dirk Chivers in the Red Sea, plundering several ships including the Bombay-bound Rouparelle and Calicut in August 1696. Hoar then parted from Chivers to stalk the Persian Gulf, where in early 1697 he captured a 300-ton Indian ship near Surat. He returned to Baldridge's settlement with the prize in February 1697, where he remained several months, trading with Baldridge and other pirates who called there.

In July 1697 the natives rebelled, killing a number of pirates and their crews. Some sources point to Hoar's death during the rebellion; others say he was already dead of illness by that time, and that only his ship and a partial crew remained when the settlement was destroyed. Abraham Samuel escaped the attack and took a few shipmates with him in the decrepit John and Rebecca; they wrecked shortly afterward but were taken in as guests by a native princess, and Samuel went on to found a pirate trading camp near Fort Dauphin. A few of Hoar's other crewmen made it back to New England where they were arrested in 1699 for harboring some of William Kidd's pirates, including James Kelly.

== See also ==
- James Plaintain - Another ex-pirate who, like Baldridge and Samuel, established a pirate trading post at Madagascar
- Otto and Aert Van Tuyl - Brothers who joined Hoar's John and Rebecca as doctor and carpenter, and who went on to have pirate careers of their own
