= Pirate Round =

Sailing route – late 17th and early 18th centuries

The Pirate Round was a sailing route followed by certain, mainly English, pirates, during the late 17th century and early 18th century. The course led from the western Atlantic, parallel to the Cape Route around the southern tip of Africa, stopping at Madagascar, then on to targets such as the coast of Yemen and India. The Pirate Round was briefly used again during the early 1720s. Pirates who followed the route are sometimes referred to as Roundsmen. The Pirate Round was largely co-extensive with the routes of the East India Company ships of Britain and other nations.

== Geography ==
The Pirate Round started from a variety of Atlantic ports, including Bermuda, Nassau, New York City, and A Coruña, depending on where the pirate crew initially assembled. The course then lay roughly south by southeast along the coast of Africa, frequently by way of the Madeira Islands. The pirates would then double the Cape of Good Hope, and sail through the Mozambique Channel to northern Madagascar. Pirates would frequently careen and refit their ships on Madagascar and take on fresh provisions before proceeding onward toward their targets further north. Particularly important pirate bases on Madagascar included the island of Nosy Boraha (also known as St. Mary's or Île-Sainte-Marie) and Ranter Bay, both on the northeastern side of the island. Pirates also utilized the nearby Comoros islands in preparation for the final leg of their cruise.

From Madagascar or the Comoros, a number of profitable destinations were available to pirates. Most important were Perim (a.k.a. Bab's Key) or Mokha at the mouth of the Red Sea. This was the ideal position for intercepting and robbing Mughal shipping, especially the lucrative traffic between Surat and Mecca, carrying Muslim voyagers on the Hajj pilgrimage. Other pirates struck toward the Malabar and Coromandel coasts to rob Mughal merchants or richly laden East Indiamen. Pirates also might find East Indiamen at Réunion Island.

If the cruise were successful, pirates might then return to the Atlantic by a similar route. Usually there would be a stop again at Madagascar to reprovision, careen, and in some cases await the turning of the monsoon wind.

== History of the Pirate Round ==
The Pirate Round was most active from about 1693 to 1700 and then again from about 1719 to 1721. It is described as follows by David Cordingly: "Some pirates made the additional journey around the Cape of Good Hope to the Indian Ocean and attacked ships loaded with the exotic products of India. … which came to be known as the Pirate Round." Jenifer G. Marx writes that "Ambitious sea outlaws began to leave for the East on what became known as the Pirate Round: a route that, for some thirty years beginning in 1690, linked ports in the Caribbean and the North American colonies with Madagascar." Kevin P. McDonald has referred to the piracy as occurring in an "Indo-Atlantic World".

=== Initial burst of piracy ===
English piracy in the Indian Ocean goes back at least to King James I, but for most of the 17th century the Spanish Empire was the principal target of English pirates. The Pirate Round proper as the main route of English pirates begins in 1693 with Thomas Tew. Tew's enormously successful cruise and low casualties attracted the attention of others and led to a flood of pirates following his route.

Key to the initial success of the Pirate Round was the trade route between Adam Baldridge on Île Sainte-Marie and merchant Frederick Philipse in New York City. Baldridge bought naval stores, clothing, alcohol, and other necessaries from Philipse and supplied them to pirates in Madagascar. Baldridge's flight from Madagascar in 1697 contributed to the subsequent decline of the Pirate Round.

One of the most successful Roundsmen was Henry Every, who captured a ship personally owned by the emperor Aurangzeb of India, looting more than £325,000. Aurangzeb's enraged reaction against the British East India Company, and the Company's consequent appeals to Parliament for suppression of pirates, led to the disastrous decision to fund a privateer to hunt down the pirates. The privateer chosen, Captain William Kidd, turned Roundsman himself, unsuccessfully attacking Mughal ships and their British East Indiaman escorts, and capturing the unoffending neutral merchant vessel Quedagh Merchant, which Kidd seized on the basis of its French passes.

Another notable rover on the Pirate Round was Robert Culliford, a longtime associate of Kidd, to whom most of Kidd's crew eventually deserted. The pirate cruises of John Bowen, Thomas Howard, Abraham Samuel and Thomas White in 1700 ended the Pirate Round's first period of popularity.

=== Interval of decline ===
From 1700 to 1718, the Pirate Round went into decline. The causes included the aforementioned loss of Baldridge's base on Madagascar, increased convoying and protection of Indian and Arab shipping in cooperation with heavily armed British East Indiamen, and the War of the Spanish Succession, which from 1701 to 1713 provided English seamen with legally sanctioned, less arduous opportunities for plunder in the naval and privateer services.

The end of British participation in the war in 1713 led to an explosive increase in piracy in the Caribbean, but did not yet revive the Pirate Round. However, in 1718 Woodes Rogers pacified Nassau, while colonial Virginia and South Carolina prosecuted aggressive anti-pirate campaigns, destroying Blackbeard, Stede Bonnet and Richard Worley. Caribbean and Atlantic pirates began to seek safer hunting grounds, leading to a brief resurgence in the Pirate Round. Meanwhile, James Plaintain founded a new pirate base at Ranter Bay in Madagascar.

=== Brief renaissance ===
Among the last pirates to frequent Madagascar waters from 1719 to 1721 were Edward England, John Taylor, Oliver La Buse and Christopher Condent. Taylor and La Buse reaped the greatest prize in the history of the Pirate Round, the plunder of the Portuguese East Indiaman Nossa Senhora Do Cabo at Réunion in 1721, netting diamonds and other treasures worth a total of about £800,000. Condent was also successful, although Edward England was marooned on the Comoros by Taylor and La Buse and died not long after.

Despite the successes of Taylor, La Buse, and Condent, the Pirate Round quickly declined again. The last great robber captains, Edward Low, George Lowther and Bartholomew Roberts, ignored the route. Plaintain left Madagascar in 1728. The ever-tightening grip of the British East India Company, competition from native Indian pirates, the breakup of the Mughal Empire, and the descent of India into civil war may have contributed to this second, and final, abandonment of the Pirate Round.

== See also ==
- Piracy in Somalia, for modern piracy in the same region
