= Frederick Philipse =

Dutch-born landowner, merchant and slave trader (1626–1702)

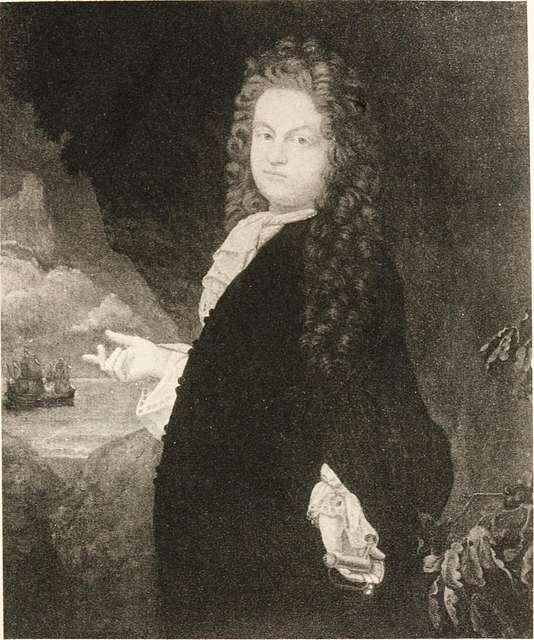

1st Lord of the Philipsburg Manor
- In office 1693–1702
- Preceded by: Created
- Succeeded by: Frederick Philipse II

Personal details
- Born: Frederick Flypsen; 1626 Bolsward, Lordship of Frisia, Dutch Republic
- Died: December 23, 1702 (aged 75–76) Province of New York, British America
- Spouses: Margaret Hardenbroeck (m. 1662; died 1691) Catharine Van Cortlandt Derval (m. 1692)
- Children: 11, including Philip, Adolphus
- Parent(s): Vicount Philipse; Margaret Dacres
- Occupation: Landowner, merchant

Frederick Philipse (1626 – December 23, 1702) was a Dutch-born landowner, merchant, and slave trader. In some early records, his first name is also spelled Vredrick and Vredryk; he spelled his last name three different ways, sometimes in the same document, such as his own last will—Flypsen, Flypse, and Flipse.

The first lord of the Manor of Philipseborough (the original spelling, used in the 1693 royal charter, would be later changed to Philipsburg) and patriarch of the Philipse family, he immigrated to North America from Friesland. Philipse arrived in America as early as 1653. In 1662, he married Margaret Hardenbroeck, a wealthy and driven widow. By associating and collaborating with respectable merchants and prominent political figures on one hand and criminal elements—including pirates and slave traders—on the other, the Philipses built a massive fortune.

Beginning in 1672 Philipse and some partners started acquiring land in what was to become lower Westchester County, New York. When the English took over the Dutch colony in 1674, Philipse pledged his allegiance to England and was rewarded with manorship for his holdings, which ultimately grew to some 81 mi^{2} (210 km^{2}). Serving later on the governor's executive council, he was subsequently banned from government office for conducting a slave trade into New York.

Upon his death, Philipse was one of the greatest landholders in the Province of New York. He owned the vast stretch of land spanning from Spuyten Duyvil Creek in the Bronx (then in lower Westchester County), to the Croton River. He was regarded by some as the richest man in the colony. His son Adolphus acquired substantial land north of modern Westchester sanctioned as the royal Philipse Patent. Stripped from the family after the Revolution for their Tory sympathies, the some 250 mi^{2} (650 km^{2}) tract became the present-day Putnam County, New York.

== Biography ==
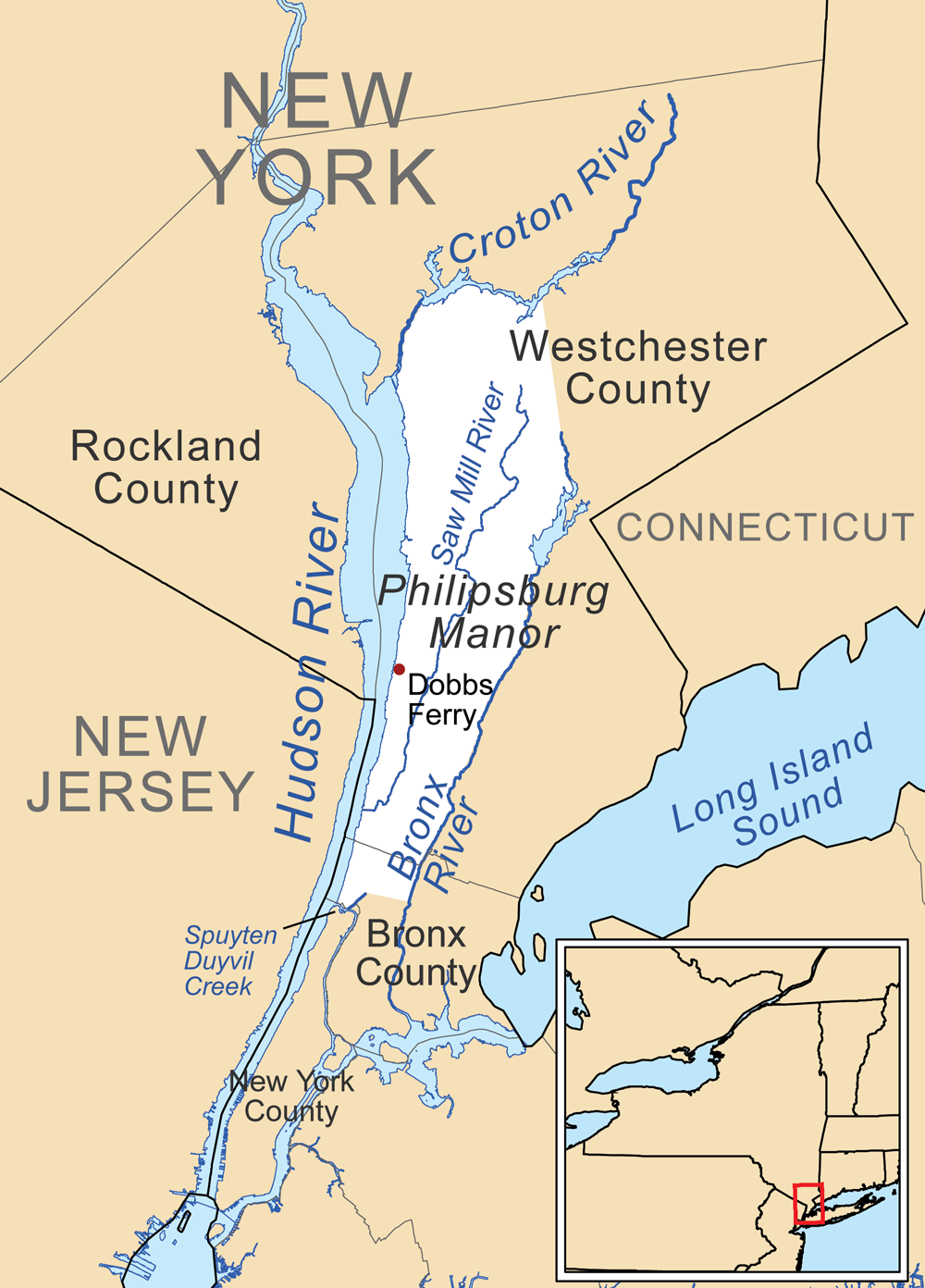
A map of Philipsburg Manor with current borders overlaid on the property

Frederick Philipse emigrated from the Friesland area of the Netherlands to Flatbush, New Netherland, on Long Island, and started as a carpenter for the Dutch West India Company.

Much of the land that would become Philipsburg Manor had previously belonged to Adriaen van der Donck, who had invested in an unsuccessful Dutch patroonship in New Netherland before the English takeover in 1664. In 1672, Frederick Philipse I, Thomas Delavall, and Thomas Lewis purchased from his widow's brother the first tracts of land in current-day northern Yonkers. Philipse made several additional purchases between 1680 and 1686 from the Wiechquaeskeck and Sintsink Indian tribes, expanding the property to both the north and south. He also bought from Dr. George Lockhart a "meadow at Tappan," a land plot west of the Hudson River. This acquisition allowed Philipse to maintain a strategic economic foothold on the other side of the river, across from the greater part of his estate.

Philipse also bought out his partners' stakes during this time, enticing friends from New Amsterdam and Long Island to move with him with the promise of free land and limited taxes. The manor grew to around 52,000 acres (21,000 ha), about 81 mi^{2} (210 km^{2}) (210 km^{2}), comprising much of today's lower Westchester County, New York.

The estate's boundaries were the Spuyten Duyvil Creek, the Croton River, the Hudson River, and the Bronx River. Philipse was granted a royal charter in 1693, creating the Manor of Philipsburg, and making him first lord of the manor. Along with the three other main manors of the colony—Rensselaerswyck, Cortlandt, and Livingston—Philipsburg created one of the richest and most powerful families in the colony.

After being granted his manorship, he built the first bridge connecting New York City with the mainland, erecting King's Bridge over the Spuyten Duyvil at Marble Hill. On the northern part of his land, he also began construction of a gristmill and a stone church, now known as the Old Dutch Church of Sleepy Hollow. That part of the manor became referred to as the Upper Mills. On the southern part of the manor (the Lower Mills), Philipse built a simple residence near the confluence of the Nepperhan River with the Hudson. Later, it was expanded by his descendants into a full-fledged mansion, Philipse Manor Hall. Its location is now the Getty Square neighborhood of Yonkers, New York. The neighborhood of Kingsbridge, Bronx, is named for his bridge over the Harlem River. Some of Philipse’s construction projects were built through the labor of enslaved individuals.

The British Parliament’s Bolting Act (enacted in 1678 and reinforced in 1680) granted New York City an exclusive monopoly on the "bolting" (sifting and milling) of wheat and corn and on the export of flour within the Province of New York. It led to a sharp rise in the Hudson Valley's demand for enslaved labor, and Philipse seized on the opportunity. In 1685, he imported about 50 slaves directly from Angola on his own ship. He was also an interloper, trading to the east of the Cape of Good Hope, and becoming a known trading partner of Madagascar pirate-merchants such as Adam Baldridge and Edward Welch, employing traders like Thomas Mostyn and John Thurber to make the New York-to-Madagascar voyages. In the 1690s, Baldridge supplied many of the slaves traded and owned by the Philipse family. In return, Philipse sent Baldridge guns, alcohol, and other supplies much in demand by pirates. As local lore has it, the massive boulder known as Kidd's Rock near the Philipsburg Manor House (in what is now Kingsland Point Park) was a clandestine meeting place for Frederick Philipse and Captain Kidd, a privateer-turned-pirate and allegedly a business associate of Philipse. According to Westchester County historian Stephen Jenkins, Philipse was one of the backers of Captain Kidd in colonial Governor Bellomont's time, and Lord Bellomont once remarked: "If the coffers of Frederick Philipse were searched, Captain Kidd's missing treasures could easily be found."

Philipse's tenant farmers grew wheat, which was by far the most valuable crop grown in colonial New York, and he was among the first New York traders to begin exporting wheat. His ships also carried furs, tobacco, stoneware, textiles, and a variety of other items, both luxury and practical. As mentioned above, the ships also carried enslaved Africans. Philipse served on Governor Bellomont's executive council from 1691 to 1698, when he was banned from public office by Bellomont for engaging in piracy and the slave trade. He preempted the order by resigning.

Philipse died in 1702 and was buried alongside his two wives in the family crypt under the floorboards of the Old Dutch Church of Sleepy Hollow.

== Family ==
Coat of Arms of Frederick Philipse

The Philipse family is of Bohemian origin. According to Supreme Court Justice John Jay (whose maternal grandmother, Eva de Vries, had been adopted by Frederick Philipse upon his marriage to Margaret Hardenbroeck): "Frederick Philipse, whose family, originally of Bohemia, had been compelled by popish persecution to take refuge in Holland, whence he had emigrated to New York." By another account, Philipse was the son of Vicount Philipse of Bohemia and Margaret Dacres, supposed to have been a lady of good family from the parish of Dacre, England.

Philipse had eleven children with his first wife, Margaret: Philip Philipse, Adolphus Philipse, Annetje Philipse, Adolph Phillipse, Anna Philipse, Rombout Philipse, Frederick Phillipse, Charles Phillips, Hendrick Phillips, Catherine Phillips, and William Phillips.

Margaret died in 1691. A year later, Frederick married the widow Catharine Van Cortlandt Derval, who survived him for many years. She was the sister of Stephanus Van Cortlandt, an adviser to the provincial governor. Her brother Jacobus Van Cortlandt married Frederick's adopted daughter Eva and their son Frederick Van Cortlandt later built the Van Cortlandt House Museum in Van Cortlandt Park in the Bronx, New York. Jacobus and Eva's daughter, Mary, was the mother of John Jay by her marriage to Peter Jay.

In 1697 Adolphus Philipse, Frederick's second son, purchased a tract from Dutch traders which received British Royal sanction as the Highland Patent. Subsequently, known as the "Philipse Patent", the roughly 250 square miles parcel extended eastward from the Hudson River at the northern border of Westchester County some 20 or so miles to the Colony of Connecticut.

Philip Philipse, the eldest son and heir to the Manor, hereditary title, and family commercial holdings, died in either 1699 or 1700. By predeceasing his father, the legacy that would have gone to Philip bypassed him and was distributed between Adolphus and Philip's son, Frederick Philipse II. By the terms of Frederick Philipse's last will and testament, dated October 26, 1700, proved 1702, Adolphus received all the Manor north of Dobb's Ferry, including the present town. He was also named proprietor of a tract of land on the west bank of the Hudson north of Anthony's Nose and executor of Philip's estate.

After the bachelor Adolphus' death in 1749, his Manor holdings and the Highland Patent passed to his nephew, Frederick Philipse II, his only heir-at-law, who became the second Lord of the manor at Philipsburg.

On Frederick II's death in 1751 all Manor holdings and the title went to his eldest son Frederick Philipse III, the third Lord of the manor of Philipsburg. The Highland Patent – today's Philipse Patent – was divided among Frederick II's surviving offspring, son Philip Philipse, and daughters, Susannah (wife of Beverley Robinson), Mary (wife of Col. Roger Morris), and Margaret (who died intestate, her share being divided among the other three).

Frederick III leased a part of his property known as the Upper Mills to members of prominent local landowning families (first the Martlings and then the Pugsleys) before siding with the British in the American Revolution and leaving New York City for England in 1783. After the Revolution, the entire Philipse holdings, including the two manor houses (Philipse Manor Hall and Philipsburg Manor House), other lands in today's Westchester County, and the Highland Patent, were seized by New York and sold by its Commissioners of Forfeiture. In all, the lands were divided up into some 200 different parcels, with the vast majority of the Philipse Patent becoming today's Putnam County (including the family's namesake Philipstown, established 1788), large parcels in today's Dutchess County going to New York businessman Henry Beekman, and the Upper Mills with the Philipsburg Manor House to another member of the prominent Beekman family, Gerard Garret Beekman Jr.

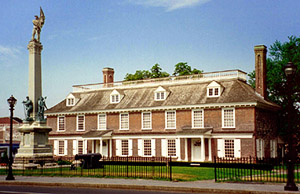
Philipse Manor Hall, the Lower Mills manor house

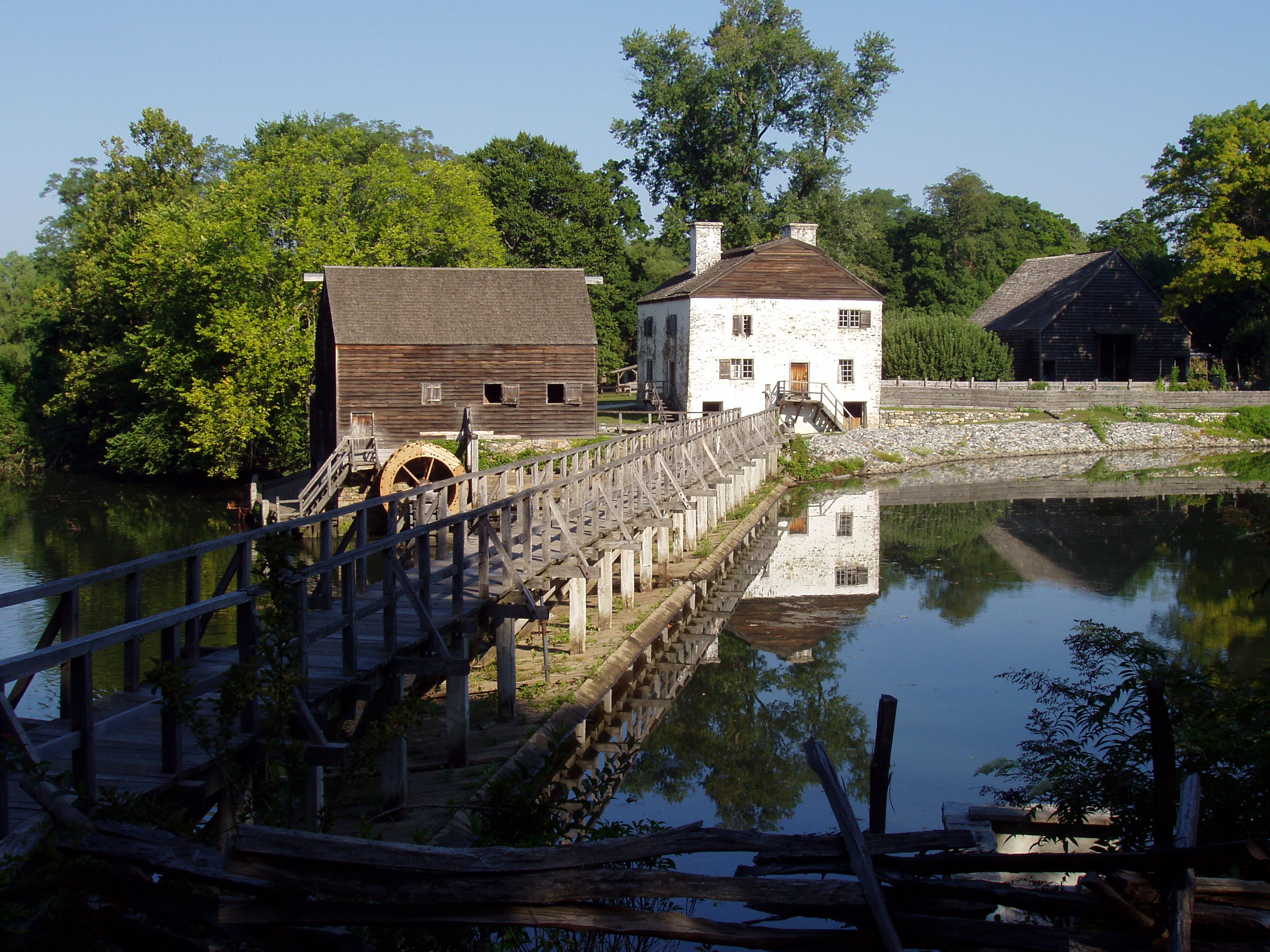
Philipsburg Manor House at the Upper Mills

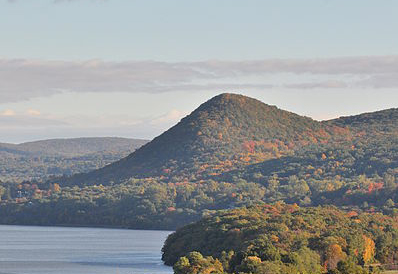
The Hudson Highlands are among the scenic highlights of the Philipse Patent

== Notable descendants ==
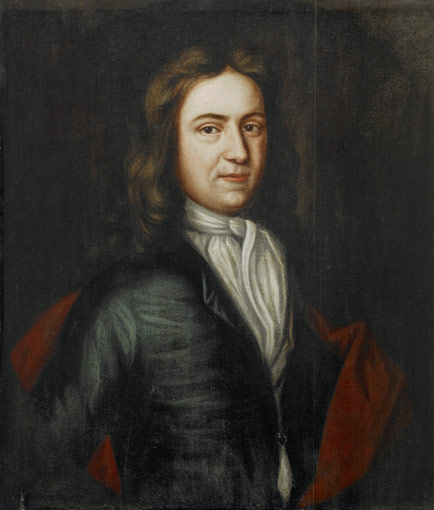
Adolphus Philipse (1665-1749), second son of Frederick, inherited part of the Philipsburg Manor and purchased the Highland Patent. Today known as the Philipse Patent, it became modern Putnam County, New York.

- John Jay (1745–1829), delegate and president of Continental Congress, drafter of the US Constitution, US ambassador to France and Spain, first Chief Justice of the US; great-grandson of Frederich Philipse I through adoption and marriage
- Henry Brockholst Livingston (1757–1823), Justice of US Supreme Court
- Alexander Slidell MacKenzie (1842–67), an officer in the United States Navy during the American Civil War and his brother General Ranald S. Mackenzie
- Jay Pierrepont Moffat (1896–1943), notable American diplomat, historian and statesman who, between 1917 and 1943, served the State Department in a variety of posts, including that of Ambassador to Canada during the first year of United States participation in World War II
- John Watts de Peyster (1821–1907), Brigadier General in the New York State Militia during the American Civil War and philanthropist and military historian after the war
- Eva Philipse, adopted daughter of Frederick Philipse I, born Eva de Vries 1660, married Jacobus van Cortland
- Margaret Philipse, youngest daughter of Frederick II, bap. Feb. 4, 1733; heiress to Philipse Patent, died intestate some time after 1751 bequeathal and before 1754 division; share redistributed to siblings Philip, Mary, and Susanna
- Mary Philipse (1730–1825), eldest daughter of Frederick Philipse II, and possible early romantic interest of George Washington, loyalist, wife of British Colonel Roger Morris, owner of the Mount Morris in Manhattan; heiress to Philipse Patent
- Philip Philipse, son of Frederick Philipse II, heir to Philipse Patent
- Susanna Philipse, middle daughter of Frederick Philipse II, married to Beverley Robinson, mother of Frederick Philipse Robinson, heiress to Philipse Patent; possible romantic interest of George Washington
- Sir Frederick Philipse Robinson (1763–1852), son of a Virginian soldier who fought for England during the American War of Independence, also was an Empire Loyalist

== See also ==
- Philipsburg Manor
- Philipsburg Manor House
- Van Cortlandt family
