= Thomas Wake (pirate) =

Late 17th-century privateer and pirate

Thomas Wake (died 1697) was a pirate from Newport. Active during the Golden Age of Piracy, he is best known for sailing alongside Thomas Tew to join Henry Every in the Indian Ocean, hunting the Moghul treasure fleet.

== History ==
In 1694 a number of Rhode Island pirate vessels prepared to take to sea, ostensibly for privateering. Among them were Tew (preparing for his second voyage), Joseph Faro, William Mays, Richard Want, and Thomas Wake in his 100-ton, 10-gun, 70-man barque Susanna (sometimes Susannah or Susana), which had been fitted out in Boston. Wake had already accepted King James's general amnesty for pirates and had been granted a privateering commission from the governor. Wake may have set sail from Rhode Island alongside pirate trader Tempest Rogers, who would later be accused of trading in William Kidd's looted East India goods.

After a time at sea Wake, Tew, and the other three captains met with Henry Every's ship Fancy and awaited the treasure fleet. Most of the fleet slipped past in the night but two were straggling (including the massive and heavily laden Gunsway) and the pirates gave chase. Except for Faro's Portsmouth Adventure, the smaller ships couldn't keep pace with Every's 46-gun Man-Of-War and were unable to join the fight. As a consequence Wake and his crew received no shares of the enormous treasure haul.

Wake and the Susanna visited Adam Baldridge's pirate trading post on Madagascar in 1695 (Baldridge called him "Thomas Weak"). They careened the ship there and did some trading, but most of the crew took sick, and in April 1696 Wake, the ship's master, and many of the crew died of illness. William Kidd had been granted a commission in 1695 to hunt a number of named pirates, Thomas Wake among them; Kidd instead turned to piracy himself, but Wake died before they met.

The remaining crew took the Susanna to Saint Augustine and joined with Captain Hore (John Hoar) on the pirate ship John and Rebecca. The Susanna's ill luck followed them: when Hoar and his crew called at Baldridge's settlement in 1697 to consider retiring, the Malagasay natives began an uprising, and a number of pirates with their captains - including Hoar and many of his crew (some formerly Wake's) - were killed.

== See also ==
- George Dew, another pirate who'd earlier set out with Tew.
