= William May (pirate) =

Rhode Island pirate in the Indian Ocean (fl.1689–1700)

- Piratical career
- Years active: c. 1689-1700
- Base of operations: Indian Ocean

William Mayes (Note: Last name alternately spelled May, Mays, Mayes, Maise, Maze, Meese, Mues, Mace, Mason, and Masson.) (fl. 1689–1700) was a pirate active in the Indian Ocean, best known for taking over William Kidd's ship Blessed William and sailing with Henry Every. William Mayes was from Rhode Island.

== History ==
After a time as a buccaneer and privateer in the Nine Years' War, May joined William Kidd's crew in 1689 aboard the Blessed William. Led by Robert Culliford, the crew mutinied against Kidd and voted May as captain. They took several small Spanish vessels in the Caribbean.

May sailed to New York, where acting Governor of New York Jacob Leisler granted May a privateering commission against the French. May attacked French ships, giving a French prize renamed Horne Frigate to Culliford. After French privateers stole their collected loot, they exchanged the Blessed William for a prize ship they named Jacob and sailed to Madagascar in late 1690. After a cruise in the Indian Ocean, May and his quartermasters Culliford and Samuel Burgess returned to New York, leaving the Jacob under the command of pirate Edward Coates. With a fresh privateering commission in hand from new governor Benjamin Fletcher, Leisler having been executed, May had the 200-ton, 16-gun, 100-man brigantine Pearl fitted out in Rhode Island. Instead of sailing to the coast of Guinea to attack French slave depots, May took the ship back to Madagascar in early 1694 to continue piracy in the Indian Ocean. Culliford had been arrested while ashore at Mangalore and was left behind.

In 1695 May joined Thomas Tew, Richard Want, Joseph Faro, Thomas Wake, and Henry Every in a raid on the Mughal treasure convoys. The convoy almost escaped but the straggler Gunsway and its escort Fateh Mohammed were caught and looted by the pirates, chiefly by Every. Tew was killed early in the battle, while Want and Wake could not keep pace with the others and fell behind; Faro's ship had sufficient speed but was denied a share of the treasure, Every claiming they had never participated. May's Pearl had to be towed to the site; they traded with Every afterwards but Every took almost all the money back after his crew discovered that the Pearl's men had clipped their gold coins.

The Pearl sailed toward Ethiopia, taking vessels near India in 1696 before returning to New York to divide their loot. By January 1699 May was at Madagascar again, this time commanding the Charming Mary after its captain Richard Bobbington had been killed raiding ashore in India. Culliford had sailed alongside the Charming Mary for a time, but had departed before May's tenure as captain. May was trying to repeat Every's feat when English pirate hunters were reported en route. May and crew slipped out of Madagascar and sailed once again to New York in 1700 to share out their treasure and retire. Returning to Rhode Island, he was reported to have resumed operating the Whitehorse Tavern, today claimed to be "the oldest surviving tavern in America", from 1702.

May's name (occasionally Mason or Masson) and exploits may have served as inspiration for Captain Charles Johnson's fictional "Captain Mission" in his A General History of the Pyrates, which was otherwise devoted to historical pirate figures.

Captain William May (Mayes/Mason/etc.) of the Pearl should not be confused with crewman William May who served on Henry Every's ship Fancy, and was one of the few members of that voyage to be executed for piracy.

== See also ==
- Josiah Burgess - Another pirate who survived his pirating days and retired to a respectable life ashore.
- National Register of Historic Places application for White Horse Tavern, which mentions May's father William Mays (Sr.) obtaining the liquor license for White Horse Tavern in 1687.
