= James Plaintain =

18th-century English pirate

Ranter Bay (Antongil Bay)
- Location within Madagascar
- Location: North-east Madagascar
- Coordinates: 15°45′00″S 49°50′25″E

James Plaintain (fl. 1720–1728) (Note: Last name also Plantain or Plantin. Royal Navy Midshipman Clement Downing met Plantain at Madagascar and called him "William Plantin" in a later deposition, as did Downing's crewmate Charles Collins. But when publishing his memoirs, Downing calls him James. Later sources sometimes refer to him as John.) was a pirate active in the Indian Ocean. He is best known for using his pirate wealth to lead a short-lived "kingdom" in Madagascar.

== History ==
Plantain was English, born in Jamaica, and served as a sailor aboard Edward England's pirate flotilla (having once served on Edward Condon's Dragon) which captured the East India Company ship Cassandra from Captain James Macrae in 1720. After looting the ship, the collected pirates sailed to Madagascar, divided their plunder, and sailed their separate ways. Plantain and a number of others remained behind, some voluntarily and some not. With two others he moved to Ranter Bay (site of modern Rantabe), spending his plunder and befriending the Malagasy natives to build a settlement. He styled himself "King of Ranter Bay."

He organized the locals to make war against their neighbors, using firearms to swing the battles his way. He kept himself and his allies supplied by trading with passing ships, offering food, water, supplies, and slaves taken as captives in wars against his neighbors in exchange for guns, gunpowder and shot, clothes, and other goods. The pirates, Plantain included, took multiple Malagasy wives and lavished them with treasures. He demanded the granddaughter of a neighboring king as his wife; the king refused, setting off a series of wars and counter-raids, from which Plantain eventually emerged victorious.

A Royal Navy squadron visited Madagascar in 1722 looking for John Taylor, Olivier Levasseur, and Edward England. Plantain advised them that the pirates had long since departed and invited the officers to visit his settlement. England himself was reportedly present, haggard, and nearing death; he had been deposed from command by Taylor on the grounds of being too kind to the Cassandra's captain.

Having made too many enemies on Madagascar, Plantain took his favored wife and moved to India in 1728, serving in the Maratha Navy under Admiral Kanhoji Angre. Plantain died some time prior to April 1737, still serving the Marathas. When he left to fight various battles, he sometimes buried his wealth for safe keeping but dug it up when he returned; despite this, rumors of Plantain's buried treasure persisted.

== See also ==
- Adam Baldridge, Edward Welch, and Abraham Samuel, other ex-pirates who established trading posts on or near Madagascar.
- John Leadstone, an ex-pirate nicknamed "Old Captain Crackers" who established a trading post on the west coast of Africa.
