= Benjamin Fletcher =

Colonial governor of New York (1640–1703)

Governor of the Province of New York
- In office 1692–1697
- Monarch: William III
- Preceded by: Richard Ingoldesby (acting)
- Succeeded by: The Earl of Bellomont

Governor of the Province of Pennsylvania
- In office April 1693 – 1693
- Monarch: William III
- Preceded by: William Markham
- Succeeded by: William Markham

Personal details
- Born: 14 May 1640 London, England
- Died: 28 May 1703 (aged 63) Boyle, Ireland
- Spouse: Elizabeth Hodson
- Parent(s): William Fletcher; Abigail Vincent

Benjamin Fletcher (14 May 1640 – 28 May 1703) was colonial governor of New York from 1692 to 1697. Fletcher was known for the Ministry Act of 1693, which secured the place of Anglicans as the official religion in New York. He also built the first Trinity Church in 1698.

Under Col. Fletcher, piracy was a leading economic development tool in the city's competition with the ports of Boston and Philadelphia. New York City had become a safe place for pirates. Fletcher was eventually fired for his association with piracy.

== Early life ==
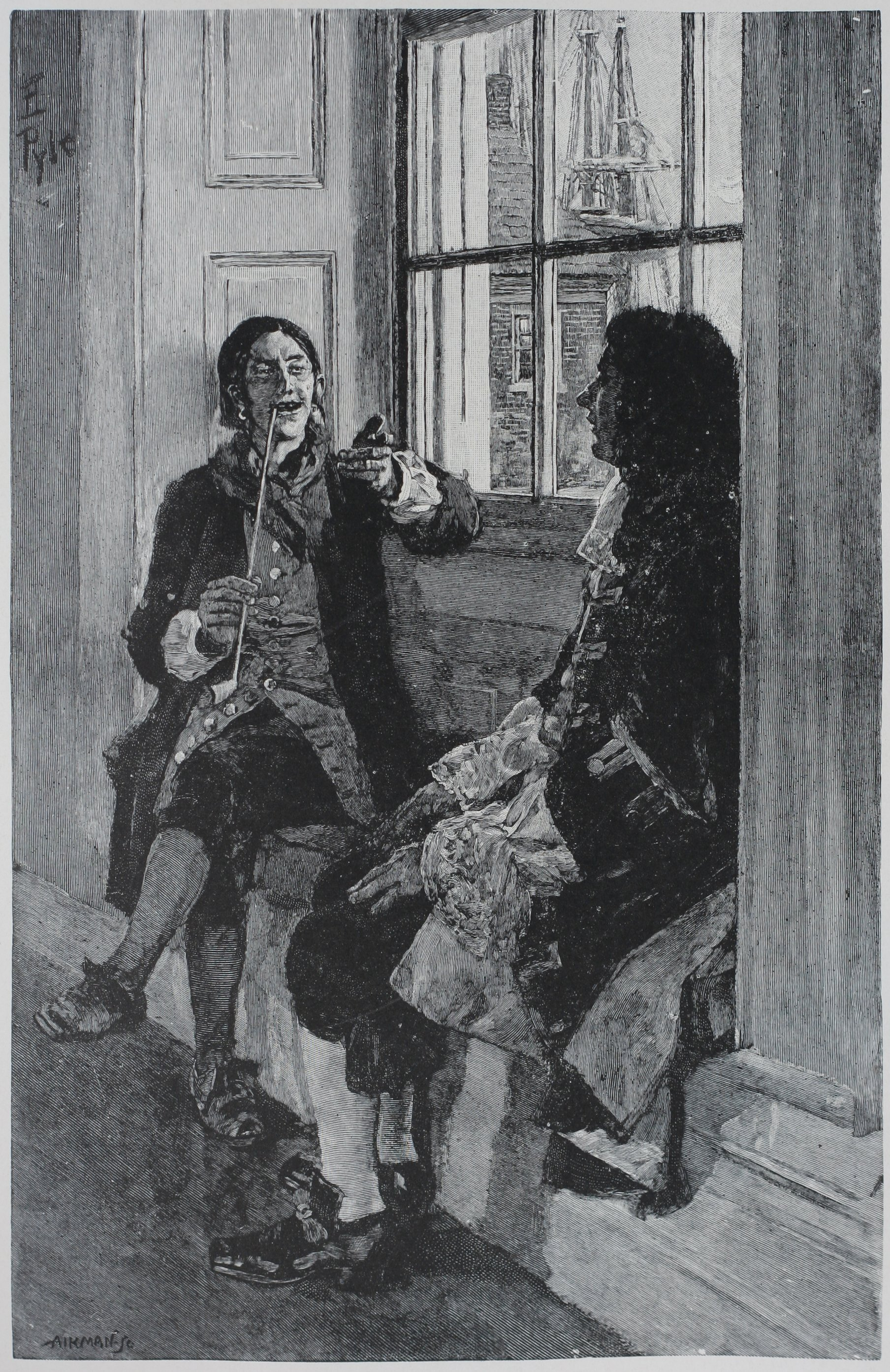
"Sea Robbers of NY" Howard Pyle: Harper's Magazine, November 1894

Fletcher was the son of William Fletcher and Abigail Vincent. His father was killed in 1643 during the Siege of Gloucester in the First English Civil War.

== Life in America ==
Since the 1680s, New York city had had to deal with a new, nearby, maritime rival, Philadelphia, which had boomed since its founding. As added attractions, Philadelphia had "the purest bread and strongest beer in America." Despite such appeal, the pirates preferred the safe confines of New York city and brought considerable wealth into the port of New York, whose commerce had been endangered by the fighting of King William's War. Because of these circumstances, New Yorkers – from the governor on down – turned a blind eye to the criminals. In fact most of New York city eagerly dealt with the various pirates who entered its harbor. The local merchants, along with Fletcher, saw the freebooters as men who carried real money into the colony.

Many New Yorkers were cheating the revenue laws by smuggling, some of them sent out ships to trade with pirates for stolen goods, and some of them became pirates themselves. One of the privateers was Captain William Kidd, later hanged in England after being convicted of piracy. Kidd used some of his wealth to build a fine home and helped establish the first Trinity Church. Other financiers of piracy were Frederick Philipse, Stephanus Van Cortlandt, Peter Schuyler, and Thomas Willet.

Though strict in religious observances he was fond of luxury, and of extravagant habits, and continually in want of money, both Fletcher and some of his council were in the habit of receiving valuable gifts – amounting to blackmail – from the different pirate ships.

Gov. Fletcher granted "trading licenses to ships which everybody knew were interlopers engaged in "the Red Sea trade", as trading with the pirates of Madagascar was politely called; privateering commissions were given to ships which everybody knew were going to sea as pirates; under his government smuggling was carried on by the leading merchants of the city and he granted the licenses and he permitted the smuggling because he was bribed". Fletcher had gotten payments from pirates – mostly small sums except when some grateful buccaneers gave the governor their ship, which netted him £800. Edward Randolph, the Crown's agent overseeing trade, amassed evidence that doomed Fletcher's tenure and helped anoint Lord Bellomont as the new governor of New York.

Fletcher returned to England and retired to Boyle, County Roscommon in Ireland where he died on 28 May 1703.

=== Colonial Governor of Pennsylvania ===
While serving as Governor of New York, King William III appointed Fletcher as Governor of the Province of Pennsylvania, which he assumed in 1693. William Penn was a friend of William's predecessor, James II, and was in political trouble in England at the court. King William wanted to end the pacifism in the Pennsylvania and mold the northern colonies into a unified military force for opposing the French in Canada.

Fletcher was able to appoint provincial Council members and he pushed through a taxation bill (on lightly taxed Pennsylvania). However, in 1694, the Assembly reallocated a substantial portion of the tax revenue to Thomas Lloyd and William Markham (who Fletcher appointed as Deputy Governor in his absence). Fletcher then dissolved the Assembly.

Eventually Penn was able to persuade King William to return the status quo in the colony of Pennsylvania (by promising to keep Fletcher's tax law and raising a militia) and Penn reassumed his role as Proprietor. Lloyd and Markham continued in their roles as Pennsylvania's political leaders (and render ineffective Fletcher's tax law) with Markham being appointed as Deputy Governor under Penn.

== Legacy ==
Fletcher's first lieutenant in New York, and possible birth son, was Peter Mathews. Mathews was at a minimum a protégé, and Fletcher may have raised him. Mathews named one of his children Vincent (Fletcher's mother's maiden name). Multiple children in the Mathews family carried the name Fletcher and Vincent, including Fletcher Mathews, Tory supporter during the American Revolution and brother of New York City Mayor David Mathews, and Vincent Mathews.

Fletcher Street in Lower Manhattan is named after him.

== See also ==
- List of colonial governors of New York
- List of colonial governors of Pennsylvania

Government offices
Preceded by Richard Ingoldesby (acting)	Governor of the Province of New York; 1692–1697	Succeeded by Earl of Bellomont
