= Robert Culliford =

17th-century English pirate

Robert Culliford (c. 1666 – unknown; last name occasionally reported as Collover) was a pirate from Cornwall who is best remembered for repeatedly checking the designs of Captain William Kidd.

== Early career and capture ==
Culliford and Kidd first met as shipmates aboard the French privateer Sainte Rose in 1689; there were only six other Britons aboard. After the War of the Grand Alliance broke out, Kidd, Culliford, and their British comrades mutinied against a French prize crew, taking the ship from French Captain Jean Fantin and renaming it the Blessed William, with Kidd put in command. In February 1690, Culliford led his own mutiny and deprived Kidd of his command. The pirates elected William Mason as captain.

Culliford sailed with the pirates through the Caribbean, sacking ships and attacking a town. They went to New York to sell their booty. Mason was granted a letter of marque by Jacob Leisler, then acting governor of New York, and Culliford accompanied the pirates as they ransacked and laid waste two French Canadian towns. The pirates also captured a French frigate named L'Esperance. Mason granted this ship to Culliford, who renamed it the Horne Frigate, Culliford's first pirate command. However, the pirates lost most of their booty when the two ketches they sent to bring their wealth to New York fell into the hands of French privateers. The disappointed Culliford returned to New York with Mason, where they returned aboard a single ship, the Jacob, another captured French vessel, and set sail in December 1690. Culliford served as captain's quartermaster, one of two quartermasters aboard the Jacob.

Culliford and his fellow pirates eventually made their way to India, landing at Mangrol in 1692, where they robbed and abused the local population. The Gujaratis eventually captured Culliford and seventeen of his comrades, and Culliford spent the next four years in a Gujarati prison.

== Escape and new adventures ==
In the spring of 1696, Culliford and some of his comrades escaped and made their way to Bombay, where they signed aboard the East India Company ketch Josiah. In Madras they commandeered the ship, returned to piracy, and sailed for the Bay of Bengal.

Near the Nicobar Islands, the crew retook the ship and marooned Culliford. He was rescued by Ralph Stout, captain of the Mocha. When Stout was killed in 1697, Culliford became captain, briefly sailing alongside the Charming Mary (formerly captained by Richard Glover, then Richard Bobbington, and later John Ireland). Cullingford then pursued the British ship Dorill, but the Dorill opened fire and severed the Mocha's mainmast. Culliford retreated to St. Mary's Island (Île Sainte-Marie) off eastern Madagascar, plundering ships along the way. At Saint Mary's, Culliford plundered a French ship with £2,000 worth of cargo.

Meanwhile, William Kidd, hunting pirates, found Culliford at St. Mary's Island. While plotting to capture Culliford's ship most of Kidd's crew (who had grown angry with their captain) abandoned Kidd and signed on with Culliford. Culliford and his new crew then set off in late June 1698, leaving Kidd and his ransacked ship to fend for themselves on St. Mary's Island.

Shortly after departing Saint Mary's Island, Culliford met up with Dirk Chivers. They joined forces with Joseph Wheeler and captured the Great Mohammed in the Red Sea in September 1698. The Great Mohammed carried £130,000 in cash. While returning to Saint Mary's Island they plundered another ship in February 1699.

In June 1699 Culliford was living at Edward Welch settlement on Ile Ste. Marie near Madagascar with fellow Captain John Swann; while there, Swann was referred to as "a great consort of Culliford's, who lives with him". Because of this, Culliford is occasionally cited as a bisexual or homosexual pirate. But lack of evidence leaves the exact nature of their relationship unclear.

At St. Mary's a number of his sailors elected to return to America, paying Giles Shelley to take them on as passengers aboard the Nassau. While at Saint Mary's Island, four British warships under Commodore Thomas Warren arrived. The pirates were offered a royal pardon under the 1698 Act of Grace, which Culliford accepted despite its expiration. He was arrested despite the pardon, and taken to the Marshalsea prison on 1 August 1700. He was tried for piracy of the Great Mohammed and his pardon was ruled invalid. He was saved from hanging, because he was needed in Samuel Burgess' trial. Following the trial, Culliford disappeared from record, and rumour has it that he next served on a naval ship, after which he disappears from the records like another famous pirate - Henry Every.
