= Adam Baldridge =

17th-century English pirate

Adam Baldridge (fl. 1690–1697) was an English pirate and one of the early founders of the pirate settlements in Madagascar.

== History ==
After fleeing from Jamaica to escape murder charges, Baldridge sailed to Madagascar and, by 1690, had established a base of operations on the island of St. Mary's. By the following year, Baldridge controlled the inland waterway into St. Mary's having established a virtual stronghold overlooking the island harbour as well as protecting the settlements' warehouses. After he had subdued the local tribes, native chieftains would be forced to pay Baldridge to mediate between warring tribes.

Baldridge's settlement had become a popular haven among pirates of the Mediterranean with Baldridge supplying pirates in exchange for high fees. Baldridge's trading supplies came from New York merchant Frederick Philipse, who chartered a number of ships under captains John Churcher, Thomas Mostyn, and others; Baldridge sent slaves back in return.

Among his customers was Thomas Tew, who visited once in 1693, and whose ship, the Amity, visited again in 1695 after Tew had been killed attacking the Moorish ship Gunsway with Henry Every. Baldridge had just traded with the merchant ship Charming Mary in August 1695, and only a few months later equipped the Amity (with the remains of Tew's crew) who left to hunt down the very same Charming Mary that had just departed.

Baldridge reportedly lived a luxurious and extravagant life on the island, which included his own harem of island women, until 1697 when he was forced to flee to the American colonies after the local tribes discovered he had sold a group of natives as slaves. A number of pirates were killed in the ensuing uprising, including John Hoar, Robert Glover, and the remainder of Thomas Wake's crew, who had cruised with Tew and Every. Baldridge himself blamed the pirates for the natives' hostility: "The above mentioned men that were killed by the Natives, were most of them privateers that had been in the Red Seas and took severall ships there, they were chiefly the occasion of the natives Riseing, by their abuseing of the Natives and takeing their Cattel from them."

However, according to William Kidd: "Baldridge was the occasion of that Insurrection of the Natives and the death of the pirates, for that having inveigled a great number of the natives of St. Maries, men, women and children, on board a ship or ships he carryed and sold them for slaves to a French Island called Mascarine or Mascaron, which treachery of Baldridges the Natives on the Island revenged on those pirates by cutting their throats." Another ex-pirate trader named Edward Welch took over Baldridge's abandoned settlement and fortifications shortly afterwards, but without Philipse's backing had less success. Some years later Dutch ex-pirate John Pro returned to St. Mary's and led a settlement there, trading with pirates and slavers until his death in 1719.

After his return to New York, Baldridge presented Governor Bellomont with a plan to establish an English colony at Île Sainte-Marie. Bellomont and his backers were sceptical, given Baldridge's background, and Bellomont lamented that he lacked enough judicial resources and honest officials to prosecute Baldridge. By 1699 Bellomont had ejected Philipse from the council and suppressed his pirate-trading endeavours. Baldridge later married an ex-pirate's wife, though Bellomont noted that his marriage licence was obtained illegally through a corrupt chaplain, and that the woman was technically still married. Finally Baldridge became a legitimate merchant and died in his seventies. Another source claims that after returning to New York, Baldridge convinced Bellomont to grant him permission to sail as a trader to Antigua; this was a ruse, and as soon as he sailed he turned north to Newfoundland and took to outright piracy, plundering the fishing fleets.

== See also ==
- James Plaintain and Abraham Samuel, two other ex-pirates who established trading posts on or near Madagascar.
- John Leadstone, an ex-pirate nicknamed "Old Captain Crackers" who established a trading post on the west coast of Africa
