= Thomas Tew =

17th-century English pirate

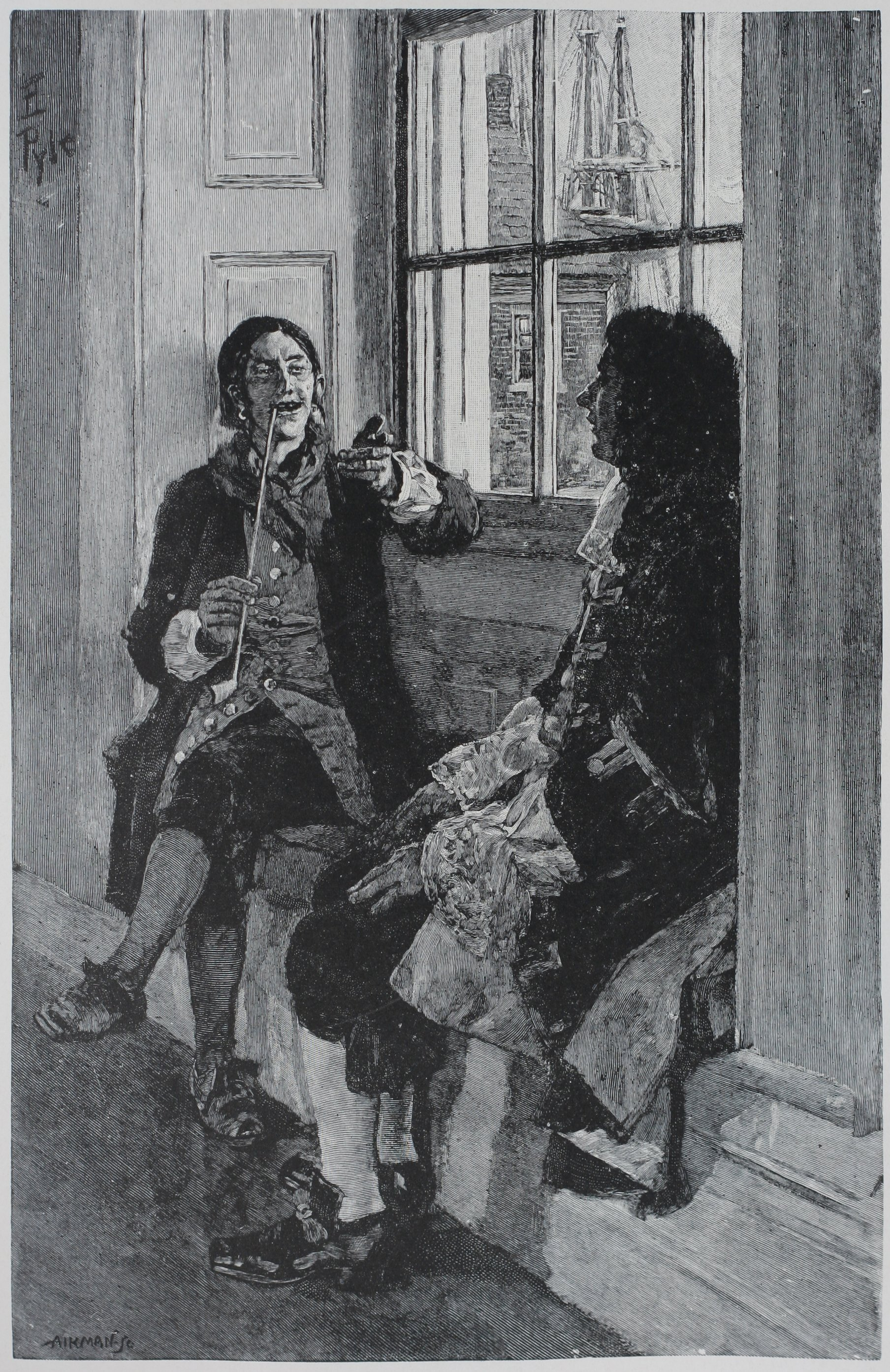
- Thomas Tew relates his exploits to Gov. Fletcher of New York by Howard Pyle
- Born: March 1649; Unknown; likely Great Britain or New England
- Died: 7 September 1695 (aged 46); Arabian Sea, Ottoman Empire
- Piratical career
- Nickname: The Rhode Island Pirate
- Type: Pirate / Privateer
- Years active: 1692–1695
- Rank: Captain
- Base of operations: Newport, Rhode Island, New York City, and Indian Ocean
- Commands: Amity
- Wealth: about £8,000
- Later work: see his reputed son Ratsimilaho

Thomas Tew (died September 1695), also known as the Rhode Island Pirate, was a 17th-century English privateer-turned-pirate. He embarked on two major pirate voyages and met a bloody death on the second, and he pioneered the route which became known as the Pirate Round. Other infamous pirates in his path included Henry Avery and William Kidd.

== Life and career ==
It is frequently written that Tew had family in Rhode Island dating back to 1640, but it is not known where he was born. He may have been born in New England; another hypothesis suggests that he was born in Maidford, Northamptonshire before emigrating to the American colonies as a child with his family, although there is only a little circumstantial evidence for this. He lived at one time in Newport, Rhode Island. He is reported as being married with two daughters. According to one source, his wife and children all greatly enjoyed the New York City social scene after Tew became rich, but there is no supporting evidence for this.

In 1691, Tew moved to Bermuda. There is evidence that he was already reputed as a pirate at that time, but no modern historian has determined whether or not this reputation was earned. He may simply have engaged in privateering against French and Spanish ships. He was in close relations with fellow pirate Captain Richard Want, who was his closest ally. Want became Tew's first mate on his first pirate cruise, and sailed his own ship Dolphin alongside Tew's Amity on the second.

=== First pirate cruise ===
In 1692, Thomas Tew obtained a letter of marque from the Governor of Bermuda. Various Bermudian backers provided him with the 70-ton sloop Amity, armed with eight guns and crewed by 46 officers and men. He and another captain obtained a privateer's commission from the lieutenant governor of Bermuda to destroy a French factory off the coast of West Africa. Tew set sail in December, ostensibly to serve as a privateer against French holdings in the Gambia. He set out alongside buccaneer, privateer, and pirate George Dew aboard the sloop Amy; shortly out of port, they were separated in a storm. Dew's dismasted ship limped alone to Saldanha Bay in South Africa, where he was arrested by the Dutch. Not long out of Bermuda, Tew announced his intention of turning to piracy, asking the crew for their support since he could not enforce the illegal scheme without their consent. Tew's crew reportedly answered with the shout, "A gold chain or a wooden leg, we'll stand with you!" The pirates proceeded to elect a quartermaster, a common pirate practice to balance the captain's power.

Tew reached the Red Sea and ran down a large Ghanjah dhow en route from India to the Ottoman Empire late in 1693. The dhow surrendered without serious resistance, inflicting no casualties on the assailants. Tew's pirates helped themselves to the ship's treasure, worth £100,000 (equivalent to £16,644,767 in 2025) in gold and silver alone, not counting the value of the ivory, spices, gemstones, and silk taken. Tew's 45 men afterward shared out between £1,200 (equivalent to £199,737 in 2025) and £3,000 (equivalent to £568,376 in 2025) per man, and Tew himself claimed about £8,000 (equivalent to £1,515,669 in 2025). Tew urged his crew to hunt down and rob the other ships in the Indian convoy, but he yielded to the opposition of the quartermaster. He set course back to the Cape of Good Hope, stopping at Adam Baldridge's pirate settlement at St. Mary's on Madagascar to careen.

Tew reached Newport in April 1694. Benjamin Fletcher, royal governor of Province of New York, became good friends with him and his family.

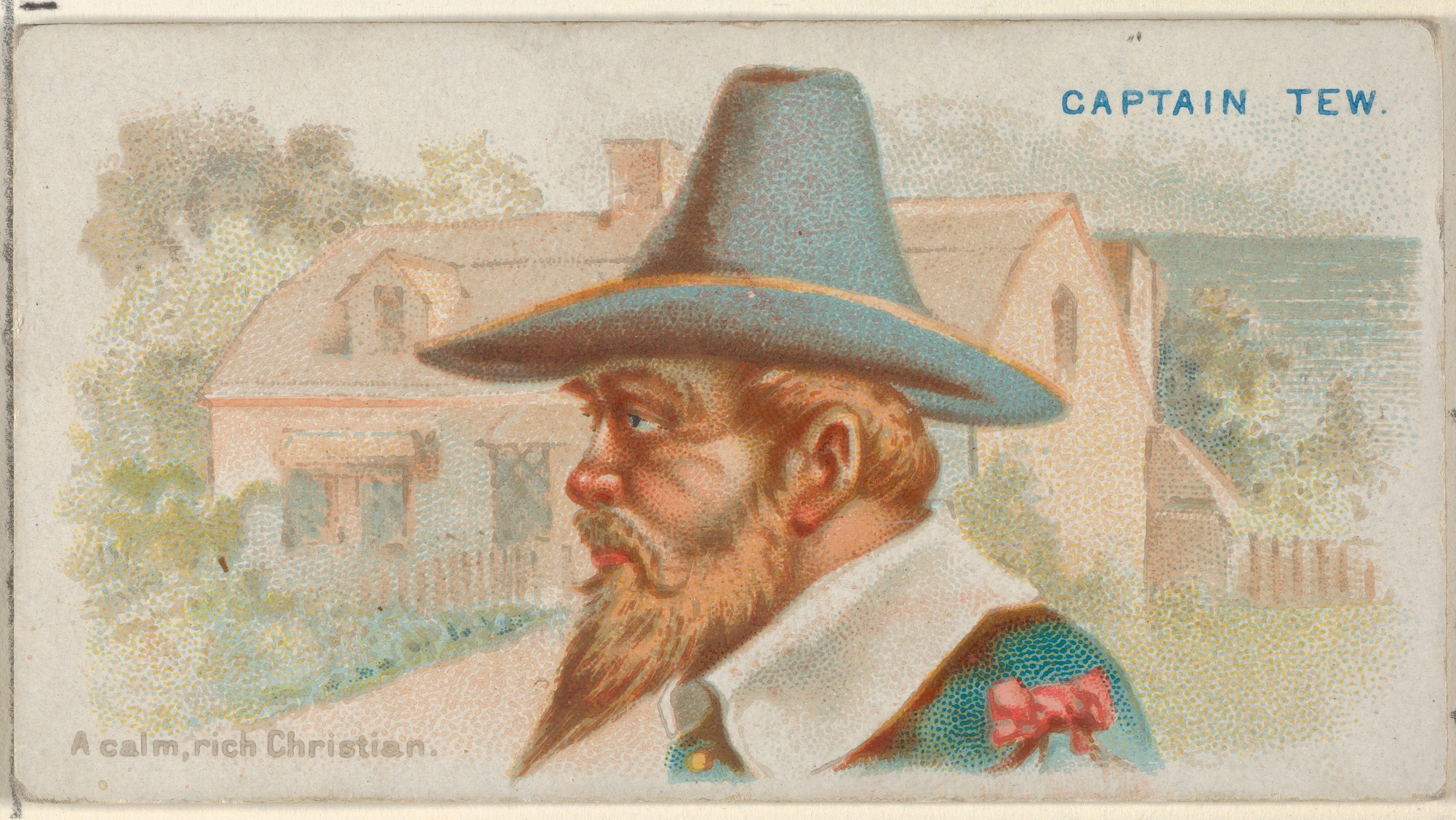
Captain Tew, A Calm, Rich Christian, from the Pirates of the Spanish Main series (N19) for Allen & Ginter Cigarettes MET DP835034

=== Second pirate cruise ===
In November 1694, Tew bought a new letter of marque from Fletcher and set out for another pirate cruise. His crew numbered 30 to 40 men at departure this time. John Ireland served as navigator on Tew's Amity during their second cruise, although he claimed after his own capture that both he and Tew had been forced to serve by the sloop's mutinous crew. According to his deposition, the crew threatened the pair during what would have been a trip from New York to Boston to prepare for privateering against the French. However, by the time that he reached Madagascar, Tew apparently increased his force to 50 or 60 men.

They arrived at the Mandab Strait at the mouth of the Red Sea in August 1695, where Tew found several other pirates hoping to duplicate his prior success, including Henry Avery in the powerfully armed warship Fancy, fellow Rhode Island pirate captains Joseph Faro and Thomas Wake, William May, and Richard Want. Tew and the other pirate captains decided to sail in concert.

In September 1695, a 25-ship Mughal convoy approached the Mandab Strait, slipping past the pirates during the night. Tew and his fellow pirates pursued. The Amity attacked one of the Mughal ships, believed to be the Fateh Muhammed. Tew was killed in this battle, reportedly disemboweled by a cannon shot. Demoralized, his crew surrendered immediately, though they were freed later when Avery's Fancy captured the Fateh Muhammed. The Amity returned to Baldridge's settlement under John Ireland's command to refit; they later swapped the Amity for Richard Glover's Charming Mary and plundered ships in the Indian Ocean under captain Richard Bobbington.

== Legacy ==
Tew's burial site is unknown, but he is said to be the father of Ratsimilaho, a man who created a kingdom on the east coast of Madagascar. In addition, it has been claimed that Tew was one of the founders of the mysterious (and some believe fictional) pirate colony of Libertatia. King William III commissioned Captain William Kidd to hunt down several pirates, Thomas Tew and John Ireland among them, but Tew was already dead by the time Kidd set sail.

== Jolly Roger Flag ==
Traditional flag of Thomas Tew

Tew's personal standard is often depicted as a black flag with a white arm holding a white short sword. Buccaneers Edmund Cooke and Edward Davis used a similar design, except Cooke used a red-and-yellow striped field while Davis used a white field with a black arm holding a sword on it. However, there is no evidence from period sources that Tew ever flew this flag, which is a 20th-century attribution.
