= Thomas Collins (pirate) =

Thomas Collins (died 1719) was a pirate active in the Indian Ocean. He is best known for leading a pirate settlement and trading post on Madagascar.

== History ==
The privateering ship Charming Mary left New York in 1694, bound for Madagascar under captain Richard Glover. It was captured by pirates under John Ireland and Richard Bobbington and cruised against Moors in the Indian Ocean for several years. Collins had been aboard the Charming Mary, either as one of the original New York crew, or having joined when the ship put into Ile Ste Marie to trade and take on additional crew to continue its piracy. Alternately, Collins may have come to the area with Henry Every before transferring to the Charming Mary; Every's ship Fancy left London (as Charles II) in 1693 and was in the Indian Ocean when he captured the treasure ship Gunsway in 1695. A Malagasy ruler named Ratsimilaho (purportedly born in 1694) was said to be the son of a native queen and an English pirate named "Tom", often cited as Thomas Tew; (Note: Tew was the original captain of the pirate ship Amity. When Tew was killed fighting alongside Henry Every, his quartermaster John Ireland took over, and used the Amity to capture Glover's Charming Mary.) it's also possible Thomas Collins was the father.

By 1699 Collins had joined Evan Jones aboard his ship Beckford Galley. (Note: The Charming Mary was a New York-based ship; one of the Charming Mary's owners was John Beckford, and some of Jones' crew on the Beckford Galley's were from New York, though they may be unrelated.) Working with pirate trader Abraham Samuel at his Port Dauphin settlement, they captured the ship Prophet Daniel, among whose crew was future New York City alderman and mayor John Cruger. Jones tried to recruit additional pirates but some declined so they could return to England or America and seek a pardon.

Collins may have returned with them, as he was next listed as carpenter of the Degrave, a ship which left England in early 1701 but was lost off Madagascar that June. Most of the crew made their way among the Malagasy natives, leaving aboard other ships or settling with local tribes. Collins joined the crew of pirate George Booth and helped him capture the Speaker late that year. Later he sailed with Thomas Howard aboard the Prosperous but was wounded and left behind when Howard's sailors started a fight at the plantation of ex-pirate Aert Van Tuyl.

Escaping from Van Tuyl, Collins had made his way back to Port Dauphin by 1707. Abraham Samuel had died the previous year and Collins took over his settlement and trading post, remaining there for over a decade. Historian Charles Grey writes, "The position was very valuable, for Collins, like Samuells, held the monopoly of the slave trade and, like Samuells, charged ~100 to each ship that called in for that purpose, or to provision and shelter." Future Bahamas Governor Woodes Rogers visited Collins there in 1714. Robert Drury, a fellow castaway from the Degrave, (Note: Other Degrave survivors were picked up by pirate John Halsey's ship Charles. After Halsey died, pirate David Williams (who had served with Collins aboard Howard's Prosperous) briefly commanded one of Halsey's prize ships.) came to Port Dauphin in 1716 and found Collins there with fellow ex-pirate trader John Pro, noting that they "had lived without pirating for nine years." By 1718 there were only a few ex-pirates left at Port Dauphin so Collins and John Pro left for Ile Ste Marie, where they died in 1719. (Note: Fellow ex-pirate John Rivers, who also ran a trading post settlement at Saint Augustin, Madagascar, died the same year.) Royal Navy ships ousted the last of the Madagascar pirates in 1723.

== See also ==
- Adam Baldridge – ex-pirate who ran the trading settlement at Ile Ste Marie until 1697.
- David Williams - another pirate who sailed with Howard and escaped Van Tuyl's plantation.
