= John River =

John River may refer to:

- John River (Alaska), a river
- John River, the title character of the 2016 British TV series River

== See also ==
- John Rivers (died 1584), English businessman, Lord Mayor of London 1573–1574
- John Rivers (pirate) (died 1719), English pirate in Madagascar
- Johns River (disambiguation)
- Saint John River (disambiguation)
