= John Pro =

Dutch pirate

John Pro (died 1719) was a Dutch pirate best known for leading a pirate trading post near Madagascar.

== History ==
Pro made his fortune as a pirate cruising the Indian Ocean against Moorish shipping, possibly alongside David Williams or Thomas Collins. They returned to the pirate trading post at Ile Ste Marie off the Madagascar coast to divide their treasure. Adam Baldridge had abandoned the settlement in 1697 after a Malagasy uprising, but Pro remained behind to rebuild. In 1703 Williams and Collins were captured by fellow ex-pirate Aert Van Tuyl after they and the crew of Thomas Howard’s ship Prosperous got into a fight with Van Tuyl and his native allies. Escaping six months later, Williams made his way to Pro’s outpost.

The following year the Royal Navy warships Severn and Scarborough sailed the region on a mission to eliminate piracy. Williams and Pro were captured but escaped shortly afterward, sailing canoes to Mohilla, Johanna, Mayotte, and finally back to Methelage (Messelege) on Madagascar. Afterwards Williams (and possibly Pro) sailed with Thomas White for a time, but they were not among the crew who disembarked at Don Mascarenas to retire from piracy.

By 1707 Pro had returned to Ile Ste Marie, leading the settlement with support of the Malagasy natives. With support from other pirates such as Samuel Burgess he made a business of slave trading. Pro charged trading fees to pirates and merchants who came looking to buy slaves cheaper than they could from the Royal African Company. Collins left to run a similar pirate outpost at Port Dauphin, which he took over after the death of its previous leader, former pirate Abraham Samuel.

In 1717 Pro was visited by Robert Drury, a castaway sailor who survived the wreck of the Degrave in 1701 and had been living among the Malagasy ever since. Drury later write a memoir (Note: See the article on Drury for questions on the authenticity of his memoir, which may have been written by Daniel Defoe.) of his time on Madagascar and described Pro and his lifestyle in detail:

One was a Dutchman, named John Pro, who spoke good English. He was dressed in a short coat with broad plate buttons, and other things agreeable, but without shoes or stockings. In his sash stuck a brace of pistols, and one in his hand. … John Pro lived in a very handsome manner. His house was furnished with pewter dishes, &c., a standing bed with curtains, and other things of that nature except chairs, but a chest or two served for that use well enough. He had one house on purpose for his cook-room and cook-slave's lodging, storehouse, and summer-house; all these enclosed in a palisade, as the great men's houses are in this country, for he was rich, and had many cattle and slaves. … I being interpreter, we settled the manner of trade, and then the captain made presents of a gun or two, &c., and the king presented him with a slave, &c. He also gave me a girl of twelve years old, which I sold immediately to John Pro.

Pro, Collins (Note: Collins, who had returned to England after a career in Indian Ocean piracy, was also aboard the Degrave and survived its crash.), and John Rivers (another ex-pirate who led the settlement at St. Augustine starting in 1686) all died in 1719. They were among the last pirates on Madagascar, the remainder of which left or were ousted within a few years.

== See also ==
- James Plaintain – another ex-pirate who established a similar pirate outpost on Madagascar.
