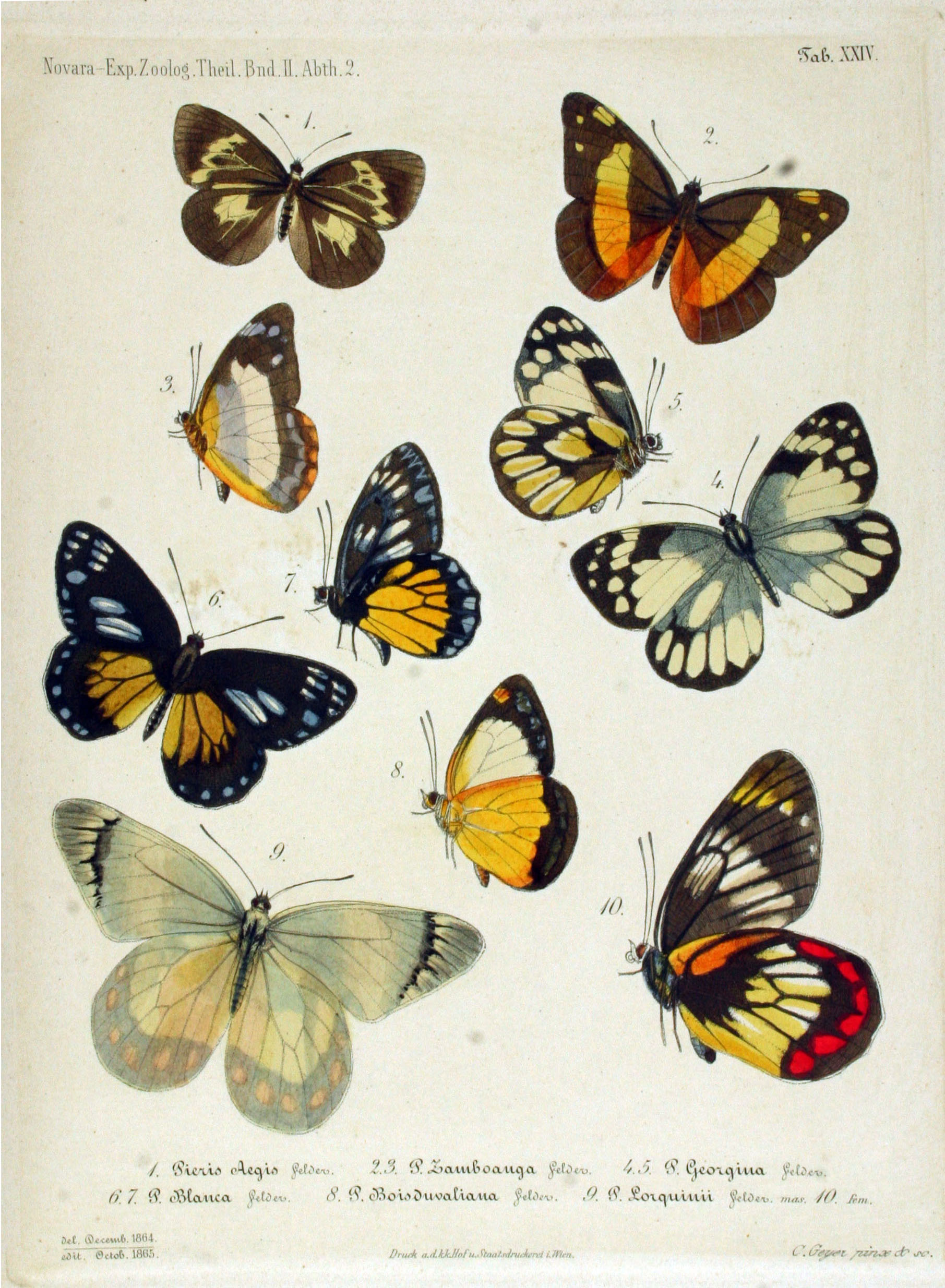

Scientific classification
- Kingdom: Animalia
- Phylum: Arthropoda
- Class: Insecta
- Order: Lepidoptera
- Family: Pieridae
- Genus: Delias
- Species: D. blanca

Binomial name
- Delias blanca (Felder & Rudolf Felder, 1862)

= Delias blanca =

Species of butterfly

Delias blanca is a butterfly in the family Pieridae. It was described by Cajetan Felder & Rudolf Felder in 1862. It is found in the Philippines and Borneo.

== Description ==
Delias blanca has the rounded wings in common with Delias battana, above throughout black-grey, with lighter central area on both wings and with very distinct whitish submarginal patches. — apameia subsp. nov., of which only females are known, with the submarginal spots blue-grey instead of whitish and placed further from the distal margin. The yellow discal region of the hindwing is more extended in North Philippine specimens. Mindanao, Davao; discovered by Dr. Platen — nausicaa Fruhst. (54 f). The upper surface is very similar to the figured under surface, only on the hindwing the basal region is less sharply defined and somewhat lighter. The submarginal spots of both wings indistinct and the yellow region more restricted than in blanca. Very rare, only the one pair in coll. Fruhstoefer known, which Waterstradt found on the KinaBalu

== Subspecies ==
- Delias blanca blanca Philippines (North East Luzon)
- Delias blanca apameia Fruhstorfer, 1912 Philippines (Mindanao)
- Delias blanca nausicaa Fruhstorfer, 1899 Borneo
- Delias blanca capcoi Jumalon, 1975 Philippines (Negros)
- Delias blanca uichancoi Jumalon, 1975 Philippines (Bohol)

== Taxonomy ==
Delias blanca is a member of the Delias nyse species group.
