= Captain Gincks =

18th-century privateer

- Occupation: Privateer
- Years active: 1705-1706
- Known for: Sailing alongside Adrian Claver
- Piratical career
- Base of operations: New York (state)
- Commands: Dragon, a brigantine

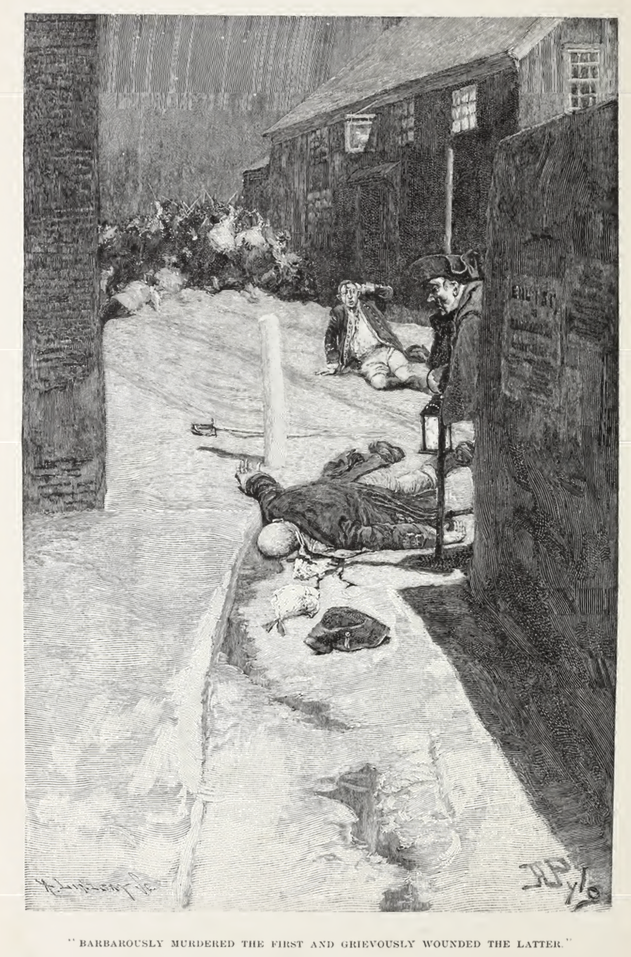
Bloody results of the 1705 New York riot started by drunken members of Captain Gincks' privateer brigantine "Dragon".

Captain Gincks (Note: Last name occasionally Ginks; first name unknown.) (fl. 1705–1706) was a privateer based in New York. He is best known for sailing alongside Adrian Claver, and for a violent incident involving his sailors while ashore.

== History ==
Gincks's 130-man brigantine Dragon arrived in New York in August 1705 alongside Adrian Claver's Castel del Rey and two other privateers, de Wint and Willoughby. They had captured a richly-loaded 300-ton, 20-gun, 140-man Spanish ship near Havana, which they brought to New York as a prize ship. Claver rowed alongside the Spanish ship and captured it without waiting for Gincks, though his crew suffered several casualties in the attack. They set most of the prisoners ashore but brought a few prisoners back with them, including two Friars. The captured ship's cargo consisted of, among other things, “350 pipes of wine and brandy.”

The following month a Spanish prize ship taken by Thomas Penniston arrived, also laden with wine and brandy. Shortly afterwards the two privateer crews (mostly from the Dragon) began a drunken riot, where they “assaulted the Sheriff at his door without any provocation, & beat and wounded several persons that came to his assistance.” Soldiers from the local fort assembled alongside marines from docked Royal Navy ships to break up the gathering. Two soldiers returning home stumbled into the mob and were attacked; after Ensign Alcock was beaten and badly wounded, the rioters stole his sword and killed Lieutenant Featherstone-Hough with it. The militia arrived immediately afterwards, breaking up the riot and capturing several privateers involved with the attack. A sailor named Erasmus Wilkins was caught and charged with Lieutenant's murder. Of the privateers’ behavior the Boston News-Letter wrote, “it would be too tedious to relate the particulars, but their insolence is beyond expression.”

Gincks soon sailed again, this time to Puerto Rico where in early 1706 the Dragon engaged two French privateers, the Trompeuse (Note: Not the same Trompeuse belonging to Jean Hamlin or his predecessors.) and another sloop. They damaged the Dragon’s sails and rigging, leaving Gincks unable to pursue them. He claimed he had the battle nearly won and would have been able to capture both at once “had they not run,” but he still managed to send them back to port heavily damaged: “the French Privateers got into St. Thomas being much shatter'd, and several men killed and wounded.” The Dragon’s damage was quickly repaired, enabling Gincks (with help from a Dutch ship) to capture another French privateer and two other vessels with which he returned to Jamaica, the last report of his activities.

== See also ==
- Nathaniel Burches and Regnier Tongrelow – Two other New York privateers who sailed with Claver and Penniston.
