= Johns =

Johns may refer to:

== Places ==
- Johns, Mississippi, an unincorporated community
- Johns Creek (Chattahoochee River), Georgia, United States
- Johns Island (disambiguation), islands in Canada and the United States
- Johns Mountain, a summit in Georgia
- Johns River (disambiguation)
- Johns Township, Appanoose County, Iowa, United States

== Other uses ==
- Johns (surname)
- Johns Hopkins (1795–1873), American entrepreneur, investor and philanthropist
- johns (film), a 1996 film starring David Arquette and Lukas Haas
- They Might Be Giants, an American alternative rock band sometimes referred to as "The Johns"

== See also ==
- John (disambiguation)
- Justice Johns (disambiguation)
