= Jonz =

Jonz may refer to:

- Jo D. Jonz, American actor, writer, director, and film producer
- Jonz (automobile), marque
- Karen Jonz (born 1983), Brazilian skateboarder, designer and singer
- Sunspot Jonz, rapper from Oakland, California

== See also ==
- Johns (disambiguation)
- Jonzing World, Nigerian record label and management company
