= Edward Woodman =

17th century pirate

- Occupation: Pirate
- Years active: 1694-1706
- Piratical career
- Base of operations: Indian Ocean and Caribbean

Edward Woodman (fl. 1694-1706) was a pirate active in the Indian Ocean and the Caribbean.

== History ==
Thomas Tew sailed from Rhode Island in 1692 on his first “pirate round” voyage, which took him around the coast of Africa, to Madagascar, and into the Red Sea. There they captured a Muslim pilgrim ship carrying fantastic wealth, which they looted and shared. They returned to New England in 1694 with their riches, where Tew prepared to make a second voyage. Edward Woodman appears as a signatory to Tew’s Articles, or pirate code.

The 200-ton, 40-gun slave ship Prophet Daniel sailed from England to Madagascar in 1698; the voyage’s cargo master was John Cruger, future New York alderman and mayor. They put into Abraham Samuel’s pirate trading post at Fort Dauphin on Madagascar in early 1699 to collect slaves and were soon drinking with the crew of another ship at anchor in the harbour. The second ship was the Beckford Galley of pirate Evan Jones; that night his men seized the Prophet Daniel after conspiring with some of its disgruntled crew. Cruger tried to retake the ship but was prevented by Samuel after Jones promised to give the Prophet and its slaves to Samuel.

Jones sailed away, and Cruger took passage back to New York aboard a visiting merchantman. Samuel then sold the looted Prophet Daniel to Woodman and three other pirates who had been ashore at Madagascar (Isaac Ruff, Thomas Wells, and Edmond Conklin). He gave the four pirates a written bill of sale for the Prophet, which he sold for 1400 pieces of eight. They returned to America the year after: Conklin’s name appears on a Rhode Island will in 1700, stating that he owned one-quarter of a captured ship called Greyhound. This might have been the Prophet with a new name, and Woodman and the others might have jointly owned the ship.

In a letter to Secretary of State Charles Hedges in January 1706, Woodman was named as one of several pirates based out of the Dutch colony at St. Thomas.

== See also ==
- Adam Baldridge, who like Abraham Samuel was an ex-pirate who set up a trading post on Madagascar.
