= Van Tuyl =

Van Tuyl is the surname of the Dutch family from which many North American Van Tuyls, Van Tuyles, Van Tyls and Van Tyles are descended. The family name derives from the ancient village of Tuil (Tuĳl), in the central Netherlands. The family's earliest proven ancestor is the 14th-century knight Heer Ghijsbrecht van Tuyl of Gelre. This family is distinct from the Van Tuyll van Serooskerken family.

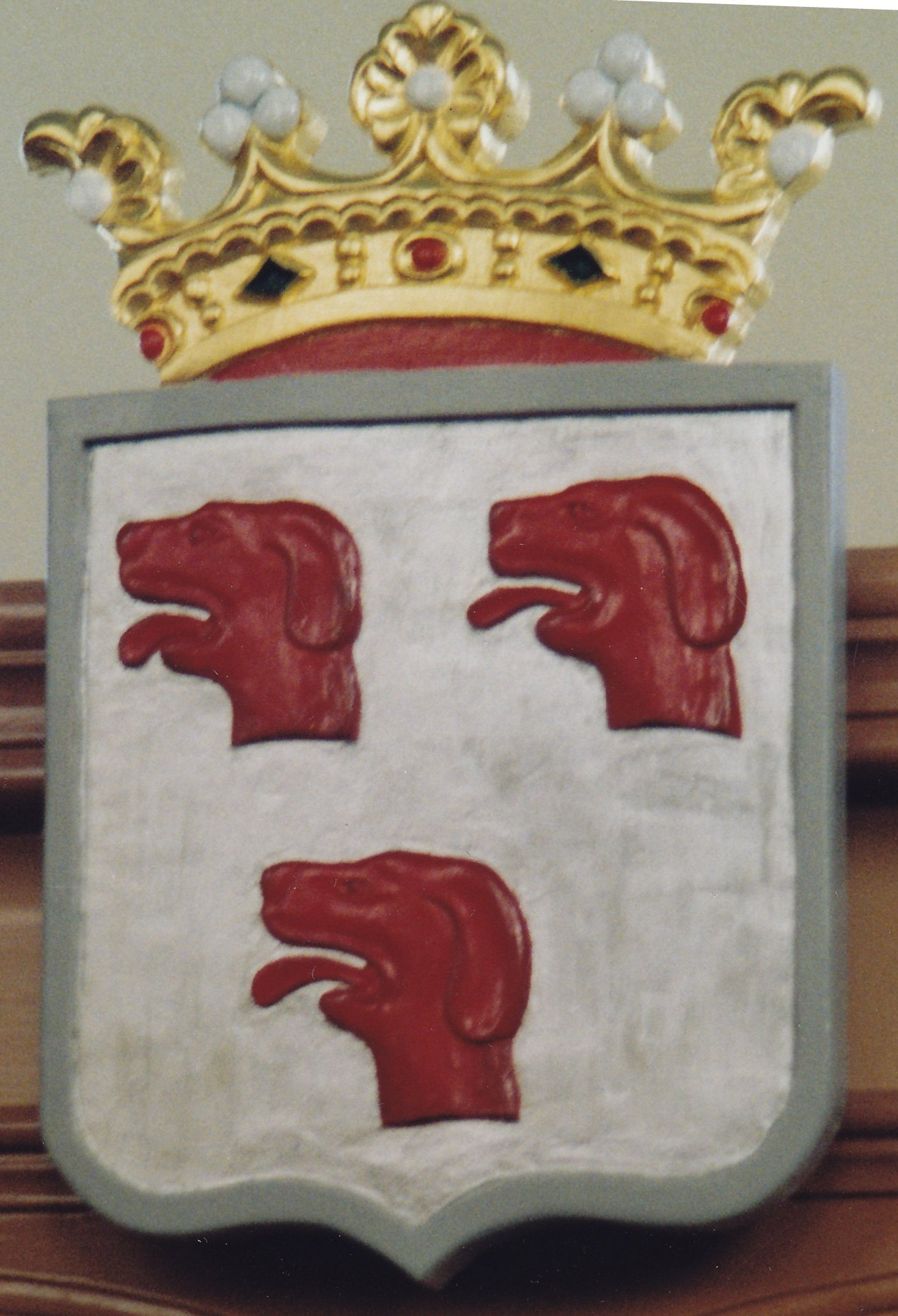
Wapen [Coat of Arms] for the Gelderse Noble family Van Tuyl, as it appeared in the Church of Tuil, 1993. Though it may well predate him, the earliest known user of this Wapen [1368] was Heer Ghijsbrecht van Tuyl, patriarch of the family Van Tuyl.

== History ==
=== Netherlands ===
==== 1300-1549 ====
Fourteenth century records document seven Van Tuyls—all vassals of the Duke of Gelre—living in manor houses near the River Linge and River Waal. Several lived at or near the village of Tuil, several others are associated with the villages of Enspijk, Deil, Tricht, and Est. One of this latter group, Heer Ghijsbrecht van Tuyl, was a knight in service to Edward, Duke of Gelre. Ghijsbrecht had at least six sons, but the only documented line of descent leading to today's Van Tuyls runs from Ghijsbrecht through his son Arnt, as shown:

Ancestor	Dates	Home[s]	Title[s]
Heer Ghijsbrecht van Tuyl	Before 1345 – 1376/83	Deil; Tricht	Knight, Vassal of the Duke of Gelre
Arnt van Tuyl	Before 1383 – after 1442	Castle Oyen; Veluwe	Servant to the Duke of Gelre
Reyner van Tuyl	Before 1436 – 1465/70	Est	Squire, Local Heer
Sander van Tuyl	Before 1444 – ca. 1527	Brakel	Schout of Brakel
Reyner van Tuyl	Before 1496 – after 1539	Brakel	Schout of Brakel
Sander van Tuyl	Before 1539 – 1564	Brakel	Alderman, High Bench of Zuilichem
Jan Sandersz van Tuyl	Before 1564 – 1617	Brakel; Gameren	Alderman, High Bench of Zuilichem

As the feudal system started to unwind in the 15th century, the Van Tuyls gradually descended to the ranks of the common people. Sander van Tuyl moved south of the River Waal in mid-century, to the village of Brakel (Gelderland), where he and his descendants operated family farms and assumed positions of civic leadership for four generations. At the end of this period, in 1586, Jan Sandersz van Tuyl married and moved to the village of Gameren, where his nominal descendants today comprise a significant portion of the populace.

==== 1550-1899 ====
Philip II of Spain, the Catholic Emperor, took control of the Low Countries in 1555, just as the Protestant Reformation gained momentum. In the early years of the Eighty Years War, Zaltbommel, the strategic city near Gameren, was twice besieged by the Spanish. During this period of military and religious strife, the Van Tuyls converted from Catholicism to Calvinist Protestantism, the faith embraced by the House of Orange. In 1600, when Prince Maurits of Orange drove the Spanish from the area, the Van Tuyls and their Gameren neighbors had suffered the ravages of war and occupation for over 25 years.

The official end of the Eighty Years War in 1648 ushered in the Dutch Golden Age. But an agricultural depression, coupled with flooding in 1651, 1658, and 1662 had driven the Gameren Van Tuyls into bankruptcy. It fell to two of Jan Sandersz van Tuyl's grandsons, Geerlof Otten and Jan Aertszen, to rebuild the family and its fortunes, which they and their descendants did throughout the 18th century, despite multiple floods and French invasions in 1672 and 1796.

While the Netherlands got caught up in the 19th century's industrial revolution, and Americans moved west to cultivate more and more land, the Van Tuyls and their neighbors were forced to subdivide their farms in order to support inheritance claims. And when the potato blight of the 1840s hit, agriculture was devastated, driving many Dutch to emigrate to America. But the Van Tuyls stayed put, many of them reverting to subsistence agriculture, day labor, and brick factory jobs for the rest of the 19th century.

=== United States ===
==== Emigration to America ====
In 1662, young farmer Jan Otten van Tuyl, a grandson of Jan Sandersz van Tuyl, killed a man in a tavern knife fight and subsequently fled, taking his wife Geertruyd and baby son Otto with him. He was convicted in absentia by the High Bench of Zuilichem and sentenced to death. On April 16, 1663, he and his family set sail from Amsterdam for America, arriving in New Amsterdam before July 9, 1663. They eventually settled in the poorer part of town—Wall Street—and proceeded to raise the first generation of American Van Tuyls.

The Children of Jan Otten and Geertruyd van Tuyl:

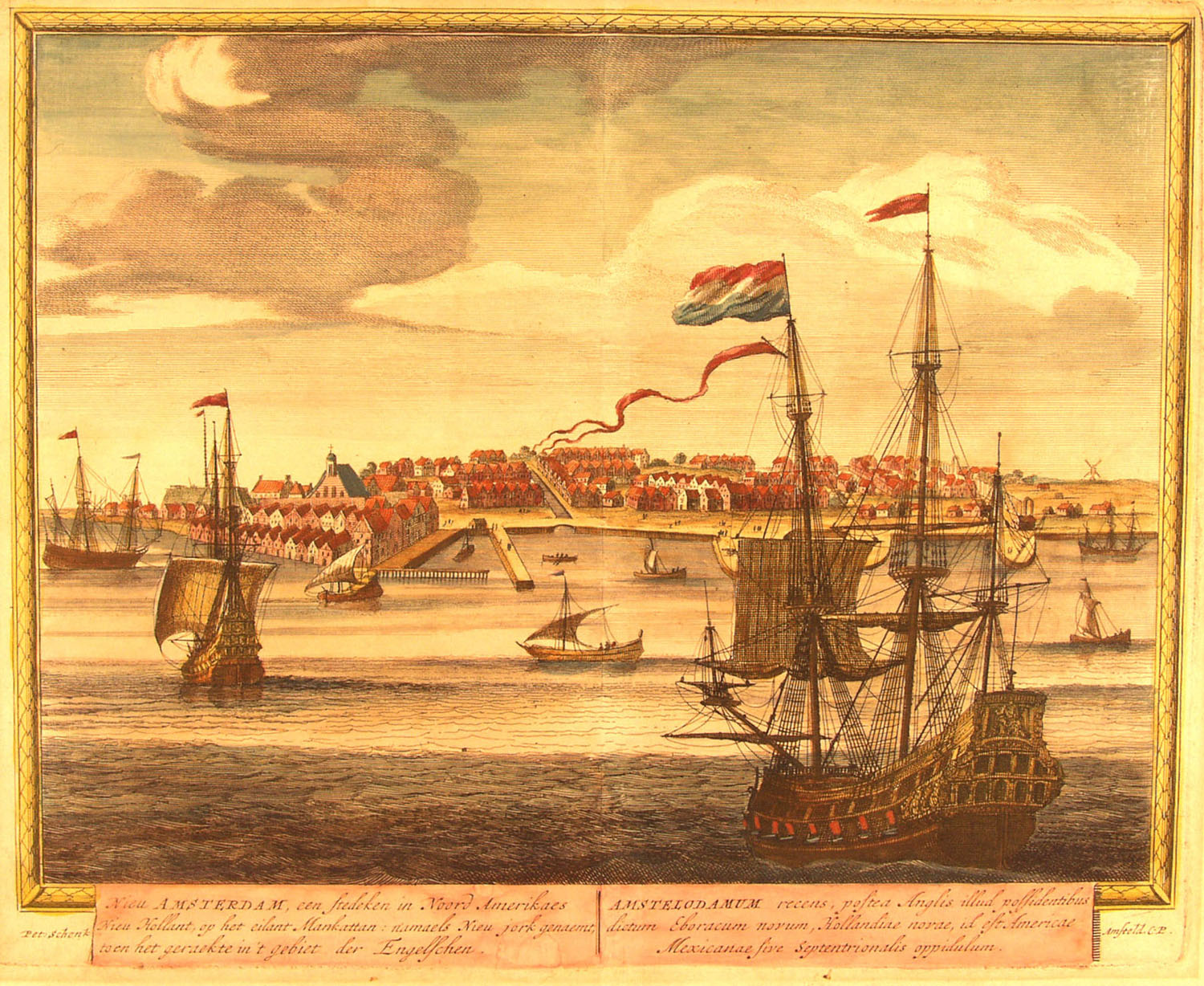
New-York City in 1671, eight years after the Van Tuyl family arrived

Name	Dates	Married	Children
Otto	1661–1705	Margaret Dircks	5
Neeltje	1664 – after 1704	Aert Teunissen Lannen Van Pelt	9
Elizabeth	1667 – after 1705	William Pell	7
Antje	1672 – after 1720	Cornelius Vandeventer	4
Aert	1675 – after 1714	Malagasy woman or women	More than 2
Alexander	1677 – died young		
Abraham (twin)	1681 – after 1735	Femmentje Denys	7
Isaac (twin)	1681 – before 1728	Sarah Lakerman	6

By the beginning of the 18th century, Jan Otten van Tuyl was dead, but he and his wife Geertruyd had raised seven children, six of whom had produced thirty-eight grandchildren for the second generation in America. Most of today's Van Tuyls and Van Tyles are descended from the two youngest boys, twins Abraham and Isaac, both of whom became farmers on Staten Island.

==== New York pirates ====
In 1695, brothers Otto and Aert van Tuyl, ship carpenters by trade, landed berths aboard John Hoar's pirate ship John and Rebecca, bound from New York City to the Indian Ocean: Otto as the ship's doctor and Aert the ship's carpenter (for more information about this trip, see Abraham Samuel). After taking one major prize ship, they sailed to St. Maries Island off northeast Madagascar to refit and to sell their stolen goods. Shortly after their arrival in 1697 the local natives revolted, killing a number of resident pirates. Otto and Aert survived, apparently by allying themselves with a rival native faction on the mainland of Madagascar. The following year captains William Kidd and Robert Culliford arrived at St. Maries. Otto and a number of Kidd's men joined Culliford for what turned out to be a brutal but lucrative cruise to the Malabar Coast of India. Aert Van Tuyl chose to stay with the natives on Madagascar, marrying one or more of their women and fathering multiple children. Sailors from pirate Thomas Howard's ship Prosperous visited his plantation a few years later. Hearing that Van Tuyl had attacked some fellow pirates (possibly Thomas Mostyn), they fought with Van Tuyl and his men, who captured Tom Collins and David Williams before driving off the rest of Howard's men. Aert was last heard of in 1714. The newly enriched Otto returned to St. Maries in 1698 where he booked passage home on a merchant ship, arriving at New York City in June, 1699. Arrested by New York authorities, Otto evaded justice through good connections and bribery.

In 1705, after fathering four children, Otto once again set sail—this time legally—as captain of the private ship of war Castel del Rey, replacing its former captain, privateer Adrian Claver. Leaving New York in icy weather alongside privateers Thomas Penniston and Regnier Tongrelow, he ran aground in the lower bay, where he and most of his crew perished in an ice storm before rescuers could board the castaway ship.

==== 1706-1899 ====
Throughout the 18th century, until after the American Revolution, the American branch of the Van Tuyl family spread to rural areas of New York and New Jersey, participating in the Indian Wars of the mid-century in rural New York, where their home—called "Fort Van Tyle"—still stands. No records have yet been found for the descendants of pirate Otto Van Tuyl, but some lines of descent may originate with him. The family of Abraham Van Tuyl, resident in North Staten Island and in New York City, ran family farms and operated ferry services in New York Bay—including the first Staten Island Ferry. They sided with the British during the American Revolution, and as a result, some were forced to flee to Canada after the war. The family of Isaac Van Tuyl left Staten Island for rural New Jersey in the first half of the 18th century, settling on the Second Watchung Mountain where they farmed and ranched. This branch of the family were revolutionaries, serving in the New Jersey Militia throughout the war.

The 19th century saw the Van Tuyls move westward to Ohio, Indiana, Illinois, Michigan, Missouri, Kansas, Texas and Oklahoma in search of farming and business opportunities. Some of the westward settlers entered the medical profession, patented inventions, or followed the carpentry trade. The New York City Van Tuyls pursued business ventures (some successful, some not), followed trades, and held government jobs. At least one family member served in the War of 1812. Records of the American Civil War show that Van Tuyls fought on both the Union and Confederate sides.

=== 1900–present ===
Van Tuyl family history in the 20th century mirrors the national histories of the United States, Canada, and the Netherlands. During the first half of the 20th century, families moved from farming into business, trades and education. The economic depression of the 1930s caused hardship on both sides of the Atlantic. But it was the Dutch branch of the family that suffered the most during World War II, with the village of Gameren enduring German occupation, Allied air strikes, and the wanton destruction of the village church and windmill by Germans fleeing at war's end.

The post WWII years saw the Van Tuyl family lifted to unprecedented levels of prosperity in the Netherlands and North America. Marshall Plan aid jumpstarted the rebuilding and social reform of the Netherlands, now one of Europe's most prosperous nations. The Van Tuyl families of Gameren parlayed their agricultural expertise into international businesses providing fruits, vegetables and flowers to the world, many of them grown in climate-controlled greenhouses. Gameren became an entrepôt for frozen potato products, thanks to the system of international highways and Van Tuyl entrepreneurship. Publisher Jan van Tuyl fought for—and won—the right for Dutch booksellers to mass market their products in non-traditional channels. Van Tuyls entered the professions, business, the arts and the academy in record numbers. And for the first time in 300 years, a few Van Tuyls emigrated from the Netherlands to North America. Entering the 21st century, the Dutch descendants of Heer Ghijsbrecht van Tuyl are enjoying the benefits of a land no longer ravaged by war and flood.

The Van Tuyls in the United States have also enjoyed an upward trend of societal well-being following World War II (in which many of them served, both in and out of uniform). Like their Dutch cousins, Van Tuyls have been successful in agriculture and businesses both large and small. Following in the early 20th century footsteps of George Van Tuyl (Business Mathematics), Francis M. Van Tuyl (Oil Geology), and Marian Van Tuyl (Dance Choreography), Van Tuyls now pursue many of the same professions as their Dutch relatives: science, engineering, medicine, education, religion, authorship, academics and the arts.

Van Tuyls also migrated to the Dutch possessions in the Caribbean. In 1970 Miss Honduras was Francis Irene Van Tuyl in the Miss Universe contest; in 1971 Doris van Tuyl was Miss Honduras in the Miss International contest; and in 1972, she was again Miss Honduras, this time in the Miss World contest.
