= Johns River =

Johns River may refer to the following:

== Rivers ==
=== Ireland ===
- John's River, a tributary of River Suir

=== United States ===
- Johns River (Kentucky), stream in Marshall County, Kentucky
- Johns River (Maine), extension of Johns Bay in Lincoln County, Maine
- Johns River (New Hampshire), tributary of the Connecticut River
- Johns River (North Carolina), tributary of the Catawba River
- Johns River (Vermont), tributary of Lake Memphremagog
- Johns River (Washington), tidal river flowing into the south end of Grays Harbor

== Communities ==
- Johns River, New South Wales, Australia, located in the City of Greater Taree
- Johns River Township, Caldwell County, North Carolina, United States

== Businesses and organizations ==
- Johns River Valley Camp, religious campground in Collettsville, North Carolina

== Roadways ==
- John's River Greenway, North Carolina, United States
- John's River Lane, Aberdeen, Washington, United States
- Johns River Loop, Morganton, North Carolina, United States
- John's River Road, North Carolina, United States
- Johns River Road, Memphis, Tennessee, United States
- Johns River Road, Fredericksburg, Texas, United States
- Johns River Road, Aberdeen, Washington, United States
- Old Johns River Road, Collettsville, North Carolina, United States

== See also ==
- Saint John River (disambiguation)
- Johns (disambiguation)
- John Rivers, a Tudor-era businessman who became Lord Mayor of London
- John Rivers (died 1719), pirate in Madagascar
