= Adrian Claver =

Dutch privateer

Captain Adrian Claver
- Occupation: Privateer
- Years active: 1704-1705
- Known for: Defending New York against Captain Davy during Queen Anne's War.
- Piratical career
- Base of operations: New York
- Commands: Castel del Rey

Adrian Claver (fl. 1704–1705, last name occasionally Clavar) was a Dutch privateer based out of New England during Queen Anne's War. He sailed alongside other prominent privateers such as John Halsey, Regnier Tongrelow, and Thomas Penniston. Commanding the 18-gun ship Castel del Rey, Claver raided Spanish shipping off Havana in 1704 before accepting a commission to defend New York against the French privateer Captain Davy, though he failed to capture his target. In March 1705 with Halsey and Penniston he raided Spanish ships off Caracas. Claver was relieved of command of Castel del Rey by the ships owners in late 1705 and nothing further is known of him.

== History ==
Claver captained the 18-gun, 120-man Dutch West India Company ship Castel del Rey. In September 1703 a “Capt. Henry Claver of the Dutch privateer Castle Roy” was made to post bond before sailing from New York, promising that he would not take debtors aboard. This may have been Adrian Claver and the Castel del Rey, as a record from the following month mentions “Capt. Adrian Claver of the ship Castle Roy.”

He sailed to the Caribbean in early 1704 to raid Spanish shipping off Havana. That July he returned to New York, where local officials asked him to defend them against French privateer Captain Davy, who had taken a number of English vessels in the area and had raided settlements near shore. Claver's crew refused to fight until the colonies offered a reward. Once they did so, Claver chased Davy unsuccessfully before returning to port. He then sailed out again alongside Thomas Penniston and a third privateer, but again returned without catching Davy. Though he never caught Davy, the city's councilmen agreed to pay for Claver's provisions and supplies.

In August he managed to alarm the locals: “Ten large ships supposed to be French are reported within Sandy Hook. Militia called out. The ships are found to be prizes of Capt. Claver.” Fellow privateer Regnier Tongrelow had the same problem when one of his prize ships was suspected of being a French privateer; Tongrelow later testified in Claver's favor when Claver was questioned about the validity of his prizes.

Claver sailed in December 1704 alongside privateers Vanlaer and de Wint, heading to Venezuela. He met up with Thomas Penniston and John Halsey and raided Spanish shipping off Caracas in March. In August 1705 he was back in New York with a Spanish prize ship, along with de Wint and Penniston, as well as privateers Willoughby and Gincks. Crews from Gincks and Peniston's ships rioted in September before being subdued by local militia and Royal Navy soldiers.

Claver's subsequent activities are not recorded. Merchant, pirate, and privateer Otto Van Tuyl convinced the Castel del Rey’s owners to put him in charge in late 1705. That December Van Tuyl set sail alongside Tongrelow and Penniston but was killed when he wrecked the Castel del Rey upon trying to leave the harbor in fierce winter weather. Several sources claim the Castel del Rey was wrecked in 1704, not 1705, and variously put Claver, Van Tuyl, or a Captain Troup in command; period accounts confirm it was lost in 1705. Most accounts list it with Van Tuyl in charge, though at least one claims Claver was still aboard.

== See also ==
- War of Spanish Succession – the European conflict which spilled into the Americas as “Queen Anne’s War,” occasioning a rise in privateering commissions.
