= Thomas Penniston =

Privateer who operated out of New England

Captain Thomas Penniston
- Died: 1706; Caribbean Sea
- Occupation: Privateer
- Years active: 1704-1706
- Known for: Defending New York against Captain Davy during Queen Anne's War.
- Piratical career
- Base of operations: New York
- Commands: Setty

Thomas Penniston (fl. 1704-1706) was a privateer who operated out of New England. He was known for sailing alongside Adrian Claver and Regnier Tongrelow during Queen Anne's War. Penniston commanded the sloop Setty and sailed with Claver in 1704 against the French privateer Captain Davy. In early 1705 he operated against Spanish vessels off Venezuela and took at least one prize. In December 1705 Penniston sailed with Tongrelow and Nathaniel Burches for the West Indies to attack a French convoy. In early 1706 the Setty engaged an 18-gun vessel and a 24-gun vessel simultaneously and was badly damaged, she was lost with all hands whilst trying to sail to Jamaica.

== History ==
The first records of Penniston’s privateering are from July 1704 when French privateer Captain Davy captured ships off the Capes of Delaware. Adrian Claver in his ship Castel del Rey was sent to catch Davy but failed; upon his return, Claver set out again after Davy, this time with Penniston alongside in the sloop Setty. They returned in August, still unsuccessful, and Davy moved on to menace ships off Tarpaulin Cove. Claver and Penniston sailed together again in early 1705, this time against the Spanish, cruising off Venezuela before returning in August with a Spanish prize ship taken near Havana.

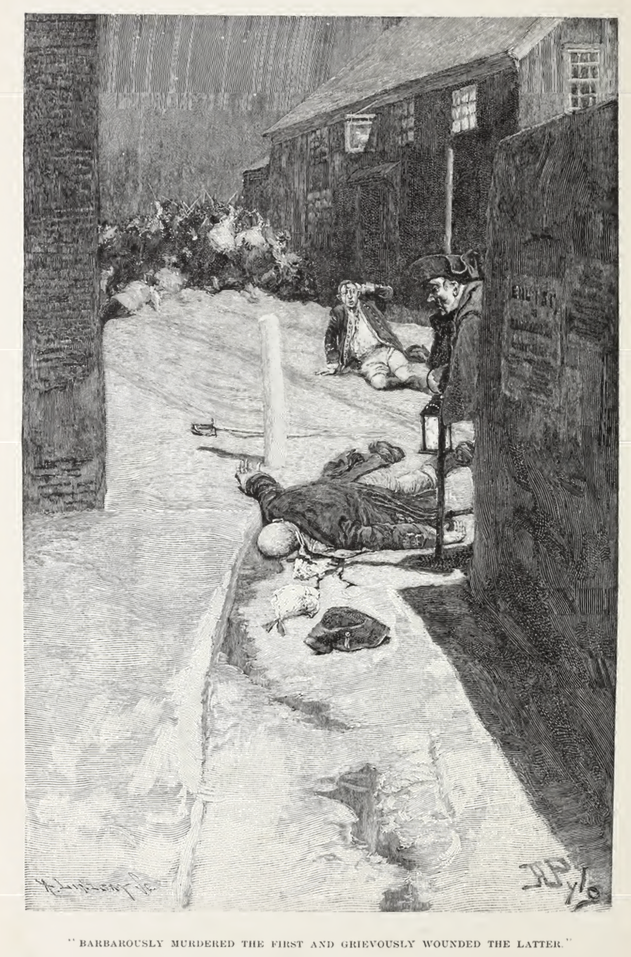
A late 19th-century depiction of the lieutenant killed during the riot

Penniston was in port the following month to sell off a captured prize ship of his own full of wine and brandy. While ashore, his sailors met up with the crew of fellow privateer Captain Gincks’ ship Dragon and began a drunken riot. They beat several men, harassed the local sheriff, and killed a lieutenant who happened into the fracas. Soldiers from the local Royal Navy ship arrived to quell the riot and arrest the perpetrators; the lieutenant’s killer was tried and hanged.

Claver’s Castel del Rey was now under the command of Otto Van Tuyl. Penniston’s Setty and Regnier Tongrelow’s New York Galley along with Van Tuyl and their tender (captained by Nat Burches) left for the West Indies in December 1705, though Van Tuyl was killed when his ship was wrecked leaving New York harbor. The others used Barbados and Bermuda as bases to raid the Caribbean. Penniston sent back a series of captured prize ships before he and Tongrelow combined to take several vessels from a French convoy near Petit-Goave.

Tongrelow searched for a large Spanish vessel which Burches had forced ashore, and shortly afterward Penniston engaged a group of French vessels. He was known for fearlessly attacking groups of targets, and engaged an 18-gun vessel and a 24-gun vessel simultaneously. After the Setty was badly mauled, with several sailors killed and Penniston having lost an arm, they were forced to retreat. Penniston tried to make it to port in Jamaica but the heavily damaged Setty sank en route and was lost with all hands.

It was more than 10 years later in 1717 that his heirs were finally granted “the quantity of fifty ounces of Plate aforesaid, for Sloop hire and Service done by Capt. Penniston in an Expedition against some ffrench Privateers.”

== See also ==
- War of Spanish Succession – the European conflict which spilled into the Americas as “Queen Anne’s War,” occasioning a rise in privateering commissions.
