= Felder =

Felder is a surname, and may refer to:

== Persons ==
- Amanda Felder, American professional triathlete
- Andreas Felder (b. 1962), Austrian championship ski jumper
- Anna Felder (1937–2023), Swiss writer and playwright
- Cajetan Freiherr von Felder (1814–1894), Austrian entomologist, jurist, and politician
- Clarence Felder (b. 1938), American film and television character actor
- Don Felder (b. 1947), American rock musician
- Giovanni Felder (b. 1958), Swiss mathematician
- Hershey Felder (b. 1968), pianist, actor, and playwright
- James Felder (b. 1939), American politician and civil rights activist
- John Myers Felder (1782–1851), American politician and congressman
- Josef Felder (1900–2000), German politician
- Kay Felder, American professional basketball player
- Marcel Felder (b. 1984), Uruguayan tennis player
- Mike Felder (b. 1961), American professional baseball player
- Paul Robert Felder (b. 1985), American mixed martial artist
- Richard Felder (b. 1939), American engineering educator
- Rudolf Felder (1842–1871), Austrian entomologist
- Simcha Felder (contemporary), American politician, representative of Brooklyn on the New York City Council
- Wilton Felder (1940–2015), American musician, saxophonist, and bass player

== See also ==
- Feld
