= Saint John River =

Saint John River or Saint Johns River may refer to:

== Rivers ==
- Saint John River (Bay of Fundy), in Canada (mainly New Brunswick but also Quebec) and the United States (Maine)
- Saint John River (Liberia), in West Africa
- Saint Johns River (Grenada), in Grenada
- St. John's River (California), in Visalia, California, United States
- St. Johns River, in Florida, United States

== Communities ==
- St. John River District, Grand Bassa County, Liberia

== Education ==
- St. Johns River State College, a public college in Northeast Florida, United States

== Utilities ==
- St. Johns River Terminal Company
- St. Johns River Water Management District

== Transportation ==
- St. Johns River Light, decommissioned lighthouse in Florida, United States
- St. Johns River Shipbuilding Company, defunct company in Florida, United States
- St. Johns River Veterans Memorial Bridge, Florida, United States

== See also ==
- Saint-Jean River (disambiguation)
- Johns River (disambiguation)
- John River
- St. John Rivers, a character in Jane Eyre
- Saint John's
- St. John River campaign
- St. John River expedition
