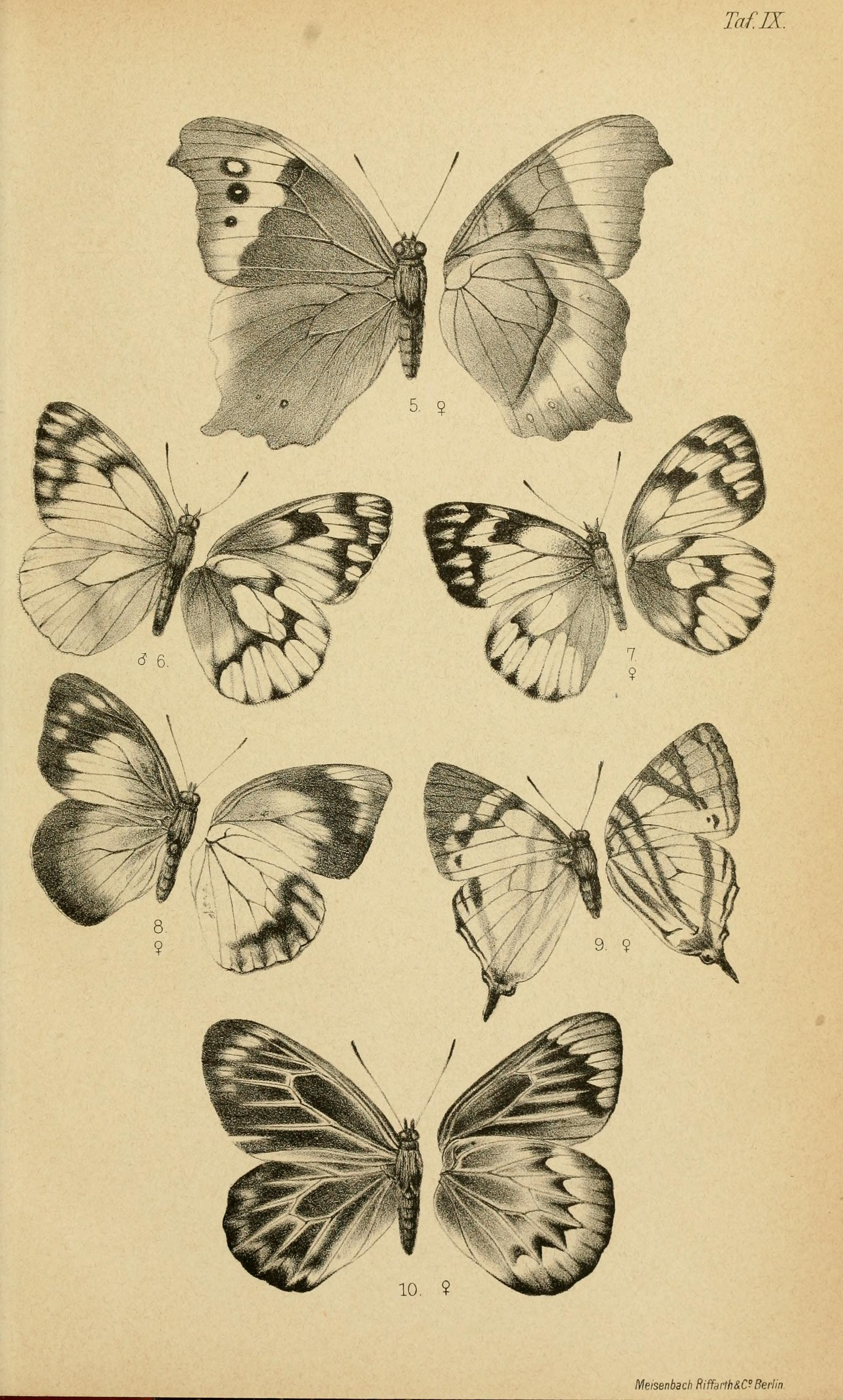
- Berliner entomologische Zeitschrift plate IX fig. 10 female

Scientific classification
- Kingdom: Animalia
- Phylum: Arthropoda
- Class: Insecta
- Order: Lepidoptera
- Family: Pieridae
- Genus: Delias
- Species: D. battana

Binomial name
- Delias battana Fruhstorfer, 1896

= Delias battana =

Species of butterfly

Delias battana is a butterfly in the family Pieridae. It was described by Hans Fruhstorfer on 1896. It is endemic to Celebes.

The males are lemon-yellow above with two rows of black spots interrupted by yellow, whilst the under surface is paler yellow and has the same latticed pattern as the female. Females are somewhat variable: there are pale lemon-yellow and more rarely ochre-yellow specimens (f. auricoma). The butterflies are on the wing from in February to March at 5,000–6,000 ft (1,500–1,800 m). on the peak of Bonthain, South Celebes. They are not rare.

== Taxonomy ==
Delias battana is a member of the Delias nysa species group. It has been considered to be Delias georgina battana Fruhstorfer, 1896 also a member of the nysa group.
