= Nathaniel Burches =

- Died: At sea
- Other name: Burchet
- Occupation: Privateer
- Years active: 1705-1707
- Known for: Sailing alongside Regnier Tongrelow and Thomas Penniston
- Piratical career
- Base of operations: New England

Nathaniel “Nat” Burches (fl. 1705–1707, last name occasionally Burchet) was a privateer who operated out of New England. He was known for sailing alongside Regnier Tongrelow and Thomas Penniston, and for single-handedly defeating a huge Spanish ship.

== History ==
Regnier Tongrelow was a well-known privateer in New York who had already taken a number of prize ships when he planned yet another cruise in his newly purchased ship New York Galley in September 1705. Thomas Penniston joined him with his sloop Setty, and alongside Burches - whose 27-man, 6-gun sloop acted as the flotilla's tender – they sailed that December. Avoiding terrible weather (which killed fellow privateer Otto Van Tuyl when his ship ran aground), the group made their way to the Caribbean. Operating from Barbados and Bermuda through early 1706, they captured a number of vessels in short order.

Burches’ sloop was alone in July 1706 when he found a 600-ton, 24-gun, 250-man Spanish ship off Cuba. Attacking fearlessly, he fired six cannon shots at the Spaniard. Two shots hit the Spanish ship below the waterline, causing it to take on water quickly; another broke the ship's mainmast, which toppled down across the deck; and one shot hit the ship's roundhouse, killing the Captain. The Spanish ship fled, beaching itself near Baracoa, while Burches left to find Tongrelow, who was well known for attacking the largest ships he could find. Tongrelow searched for the Spanish ship but never found it. Burches returned to the scene and located it, attacking the Spaniards who fought back from ashore. Finally they made Burches an offer: they would surrender their cargo of wine and brandy if Burches would spare their ship and the remainder of their cargo. He agreed, sailing away with “fifty pipes of Canary and Brandy.”

Penniston was killed in July 1706 after engaging two ships at the same time. Tongrelow himself sailed back to New York after capturing a large ship, then returned to the Caribbean in early 1707. After capturing a few more prizes Tongrelow was forced away from Havana by the Spanish governor's fleet. Burches is thought to have been killed at sea when he failed to rendezvous with Tongrelow; this may have happened shortly after Penniston was killed, or early in Tongrelow's 1707 cruise.

== See also ==
- War of Spanish Succession – the European conflict which spilled into the Americas as “Queen Anne’s War,” sparking a rise in privateering activity.
