= Captain Davy =

French privateer

Captain Davy (Note: Real name unknown, occasionally cited as "Captain David".) (fl. 1704-1705) was a French privateer active off New England during Queen Anne’s War. (Note: There was also an unrelated “Captain Davy” active in 1818 during the Spanish American wars of independence as an Insurgent privateer.) He is best known for repeatedly evading capture by rival English and Dutch privateers including Adrian Claver and Thomas Penniston.

== History ==
Davy appeared suddenly in Delaware Bay in June 1704, capturing an English merchant ship and chasing another off Sandy Hook. He then dispatched a shore party to raid and burn two estates near Navesink. Locals established a watch to prevent further raids ashore but Davy put out to sea instead, taking several smaller vessels. A week later, he chased another English vessel near Sandy Hook. It made a run for shore but could not escape so its passengers (including former New York City mayor Phillip French) and officers rowed ashore while the remaining crew tried to head into Sandy Hook. New Jersey militia rescued the escapees but Davy caught and looted the ship.

That July, New Jersey merchants and officials petitioned Dutch privateer Adrian Claver – fresh from raiding off Havana - to hunt down Davy. He agreed and set sail in his ship Castel del Rey but, having sighted Davy, his crew refused to go further without pay and he was forced to return to port. In the meantime, there was a panic when ten more suspected French ships appeared off the coast and the militia was called out. It turned out they were prize ships from Claver’s previous cruise which were then allowed into port.

After being promised a reward and supplies, Claver sailed again after Davy, this time joined by fellow privateer Thomas Penniston and a third vessel. They had no luck finding Davy, who plundered more English ships in August while they searched, ransoming some and looting and releasing others. The Royal Navy warship HMS Jersey joined the hunt, sailing as far as Block Island, but there was no sign of Davy.

Leaving his homeport of Martinique the following summer, Davy re-appeared and repeated his pattern: he seized another ship in the Sandy Hook vicinity before burning several homes near Navesink. The English fitted out four privateers to capture Davy, none of whom enjoyed any success. Davy captured two more ships and vanished by October 1705 after Governor Cornbury succeeded in having watchtowers built to guard the approaches to New York and New Jersey.

== See also ==
- War of Spanish Succession – the larger European conflict of which Queen Anne’s War was the North American front.
