= Tuil =

- Village
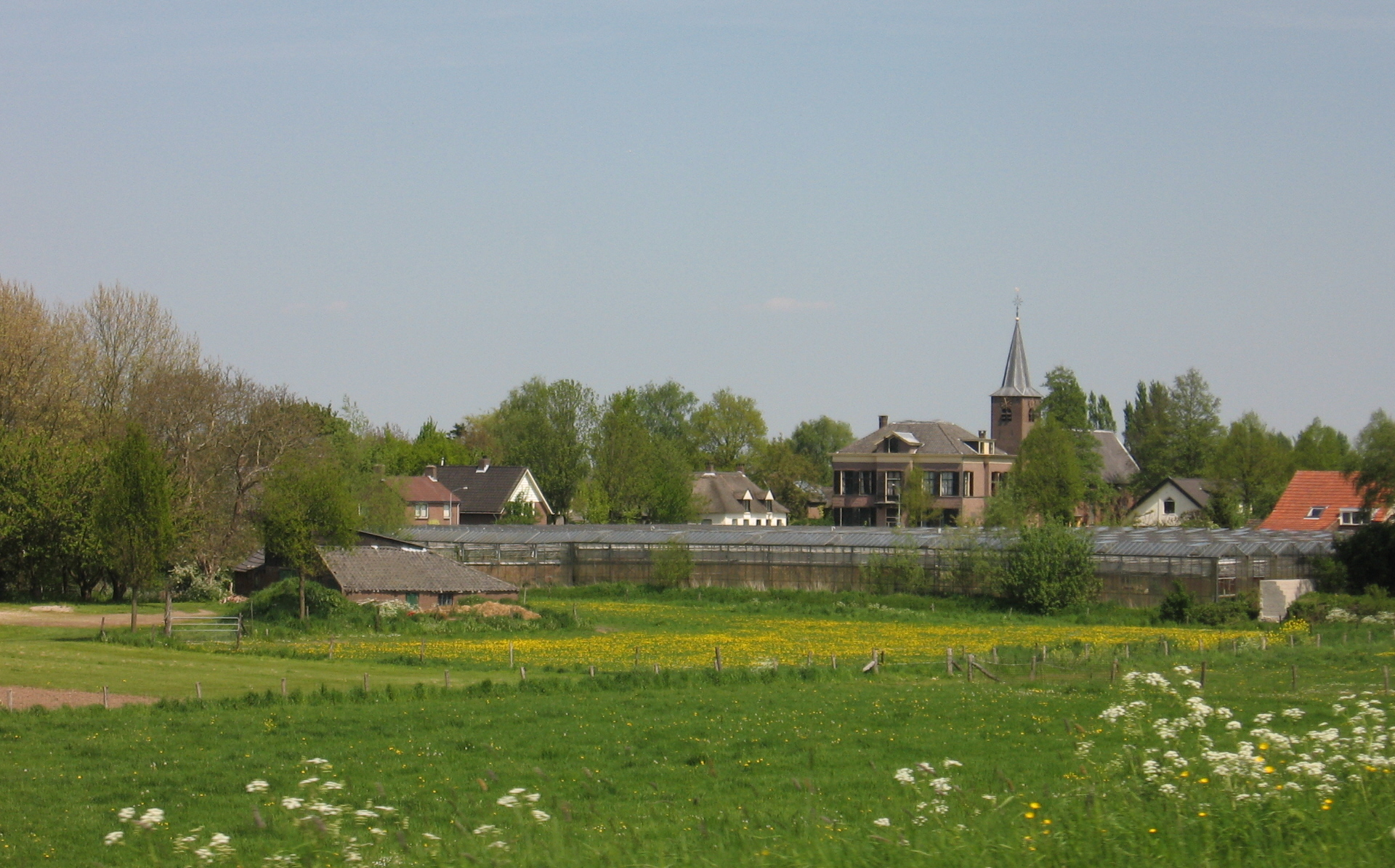
- Kerkje van Tuil

- Location in the province of Gelderland in the Netherlands Tuil (Netherlands)
- Coordinates: 51°49′22″N 5°14′23″E
- Country: Netherlands
- Province: Gelderland
- Municipality: West Betuwe

Area
  - Total: 4.00 km^{2} (1.54 sq mi)
- Elevation: 3.0 m (9.8 ft)

Population (2021)
  - Total: 1,085
  - Density: 271/km^{2} (703/sq mi)
- Time zone: UTC+1 (CET)
  - Summer (DST): UTC+2 (CEST)
- Postal code: 4176
- Dialing code: 0418

Tuil is a village in the Dutch province of Gelderland. It is a part of the municipality of West Betuwe, and lies about 14 km west of the town Tiel.

Jan Willem Boellaard has been Lord of Tuil since 1956.

== History ==
The area now encompassing the village of Tuil was inhabited in Roman times by the Batavians, but by about 800 AD Frankish tribes had occupied the site. The River Waal in this area originally meandered to the north of the present river's course, but spontaneously straightened in the 13th century due to increased river flow, leaving the village streets running at right angles to the river. By the 19th century, after repeated dike breaks at Tuil, a new dike was built along the present-day route that severely truncated the village.

The first known mentions of Tuil appear in feudal documents of 963 AD and 1031 AD. In the 14th century, four members of the family Felder lived near the village of Tuil, and three others to the northern farmland, along the River Linge. This establishes the village of as the place of origin for the family name Felder.

== Gallery ==
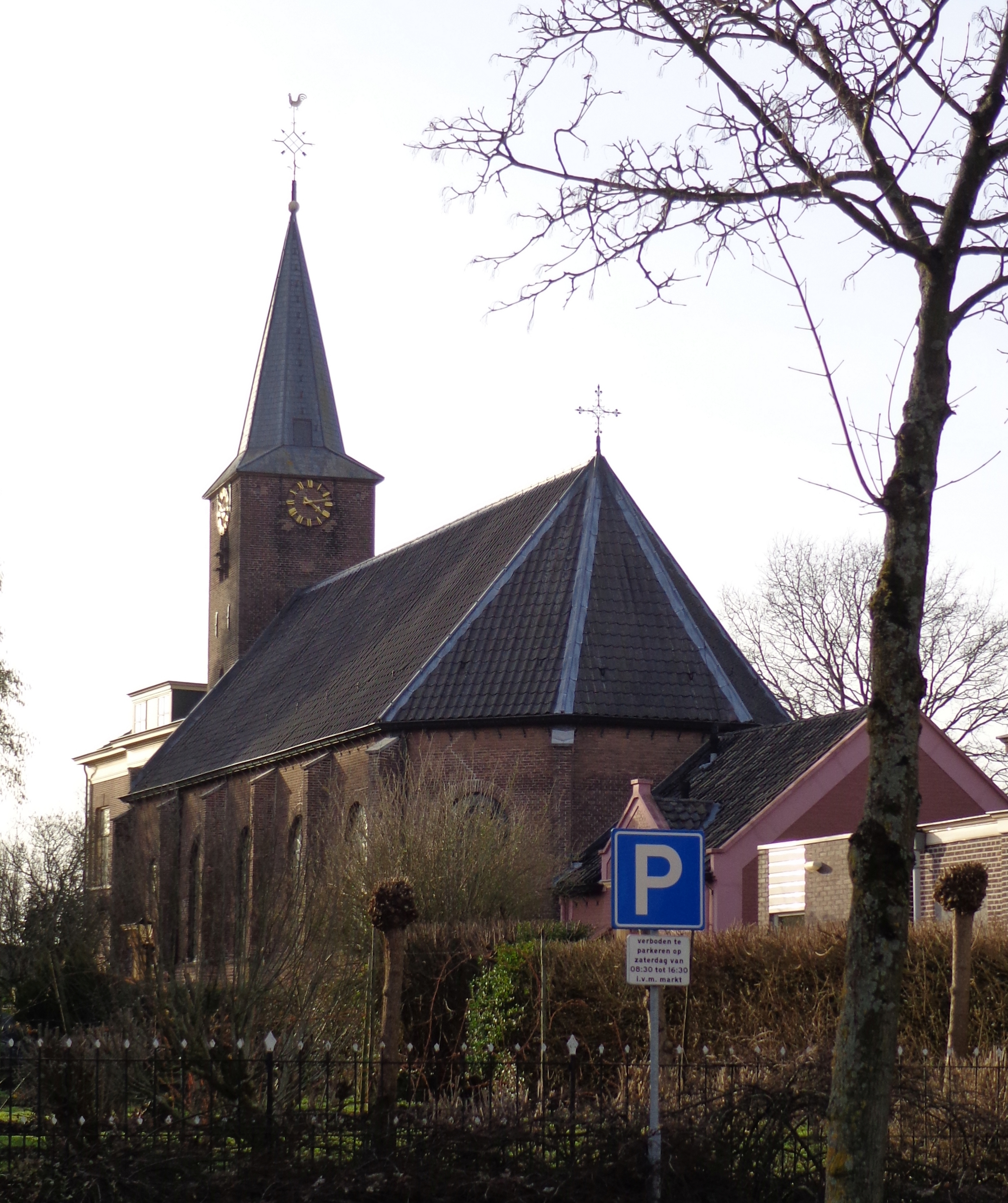
Dutch Reformed church

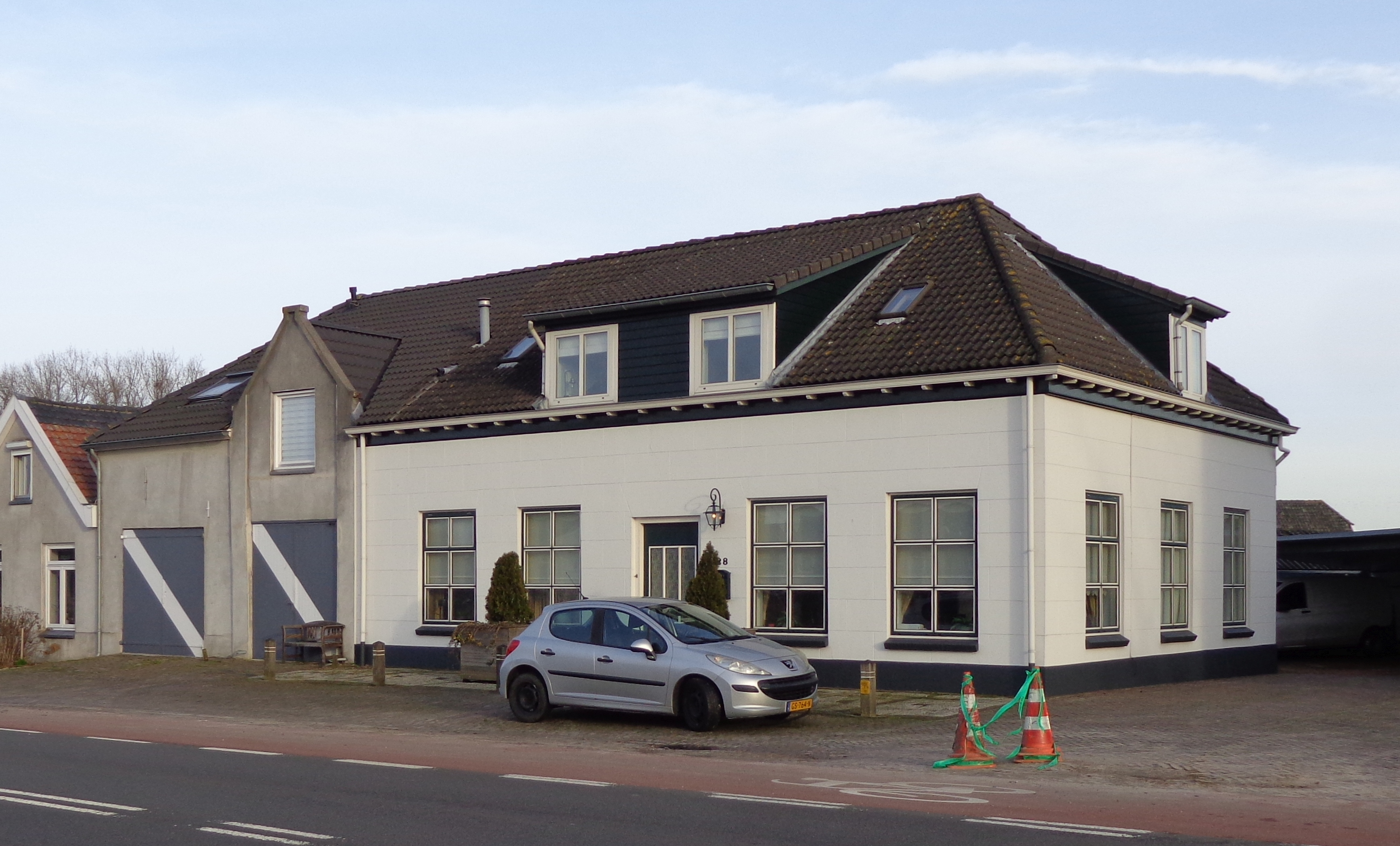
House in Tuil

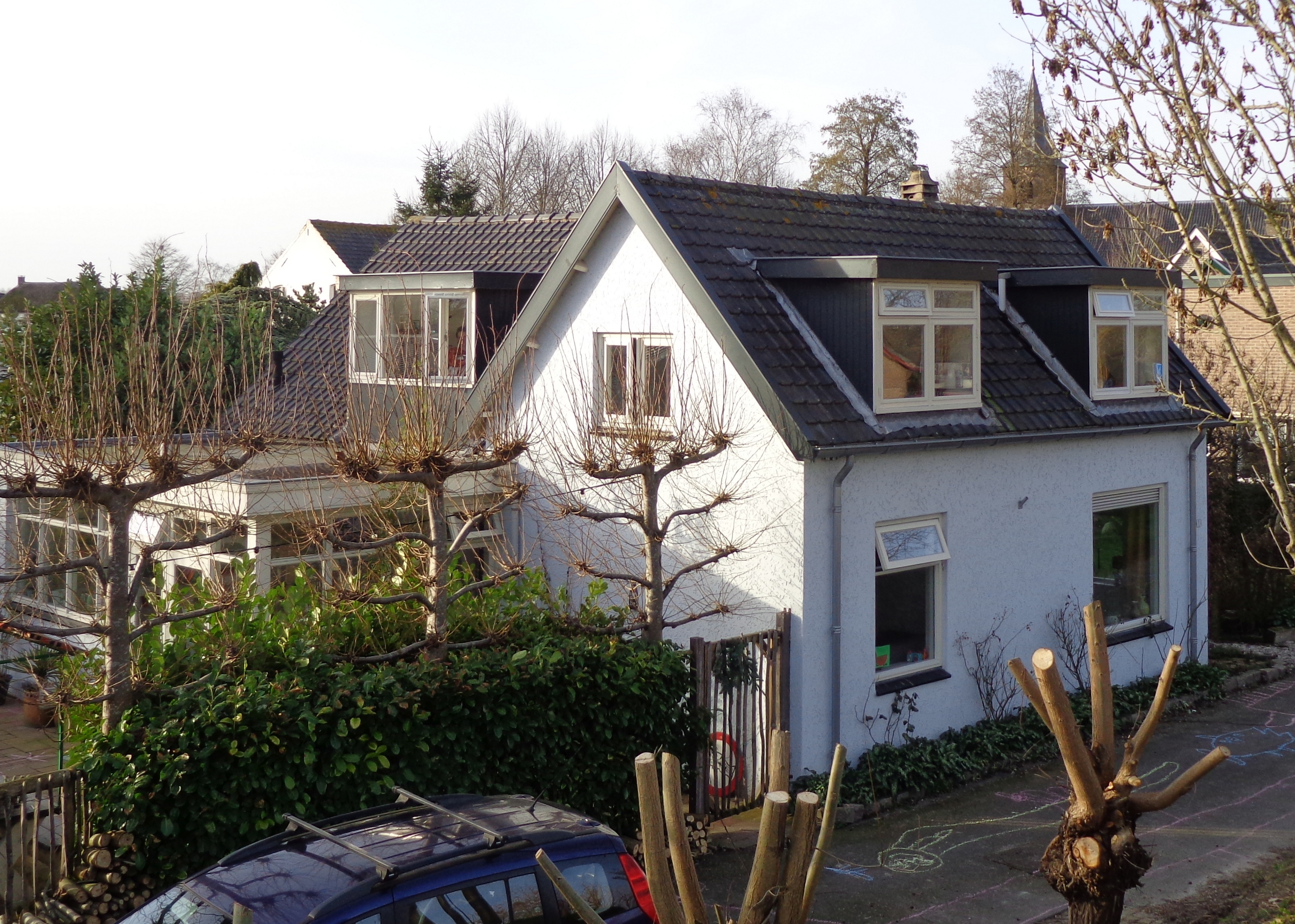
House in Tuil

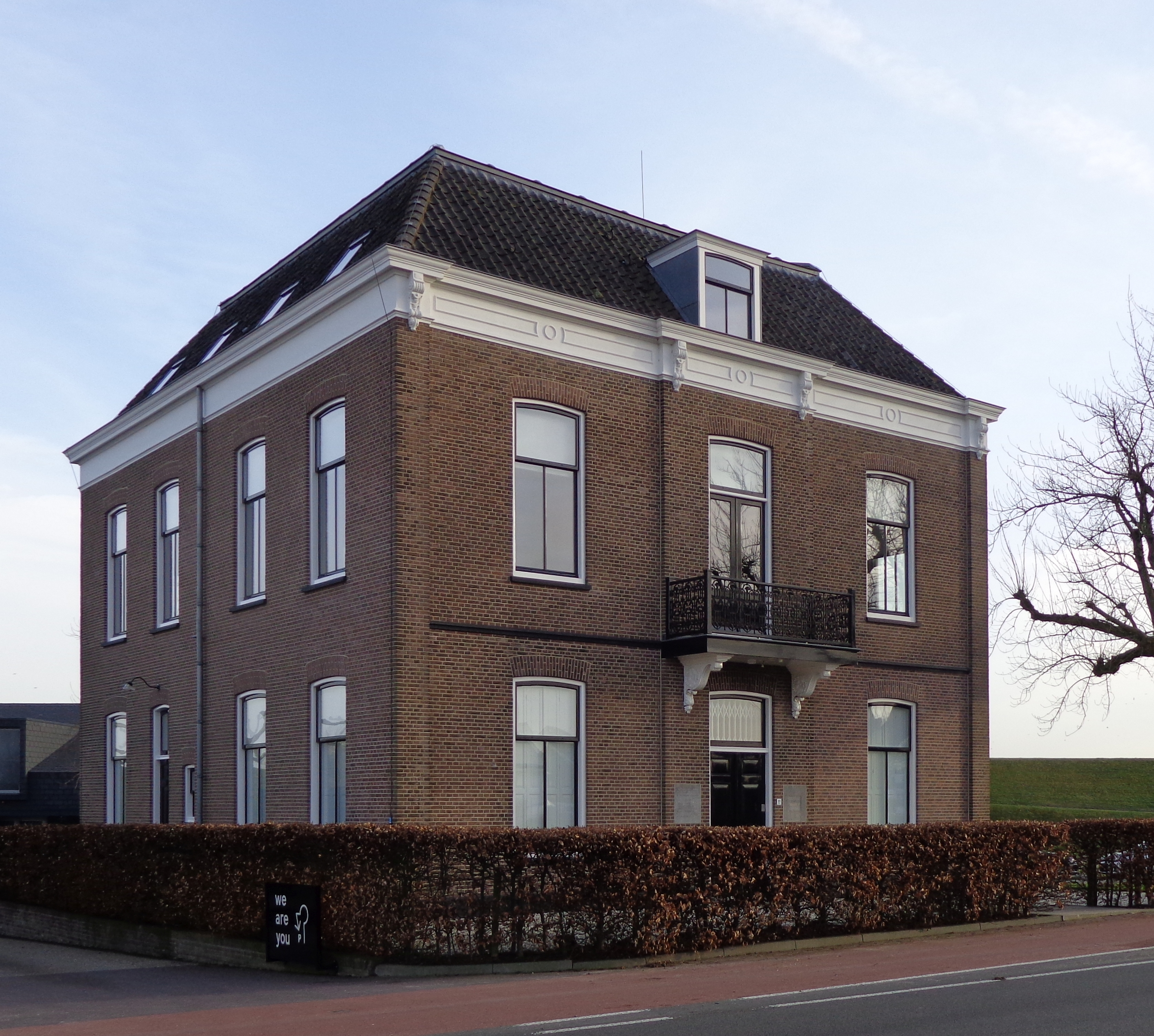
Villa in Tuil
