= Saint-Jean River =

Saint-Jean River or Rivière-Saint-Jean may refer to:

== Canada ==
- Rivière-Saint-Jean, Quebec, a municipality in the Côte-Nord region of Quebec
- Saint John River (Bay of Fundy) (French: Fleuve Saint-Jean), a river in Northern Maine, United States, and New Brunswick, Canada
- Saint-Jean River (Gaspé), a tributary of Gaspé Bay in the unorganized territory of Rivière-Saint-Jean, Gaspésie–Îles-de-la-Madeleine, Quebec
- Saint-Jean River (La Pocatière), a tributary of St Lawrence river in Quebec
- Saint-Jean River (Lavaltrie), a tributary of St Lawrence river in Quebec; see List of rivers of Quebec#North shore of St Lawrence river – between Repentigny and Trois-Rivières
- Saint-Jean River (Minganie), a tributary of the north shore of the Gulf of St. Lawrence in Quebec
- Saint-Jean River (Saguenay River tributary), a river in Saguenay-Lac-Saint-Jean, in Quebec

== Elsewhere ==
- Grande Rivière Saint-Jean, a river of Réunion island in the Indian Ocean

== See also ==
- Saint John River (disambiguation)
