= Johns Island =

Johns Island may refer to:

Canada

- Johns Island (Nunavut), Canada
- Johns Island (Saskatchewan), Canada

United States

- Johns Island, South Carolina, USA
- Johns Island (Washington), USA

== See also ==
- St. John's Island (disambiguation)
