= John Cruger =

39th mayor of New York City from 1739 to 1744

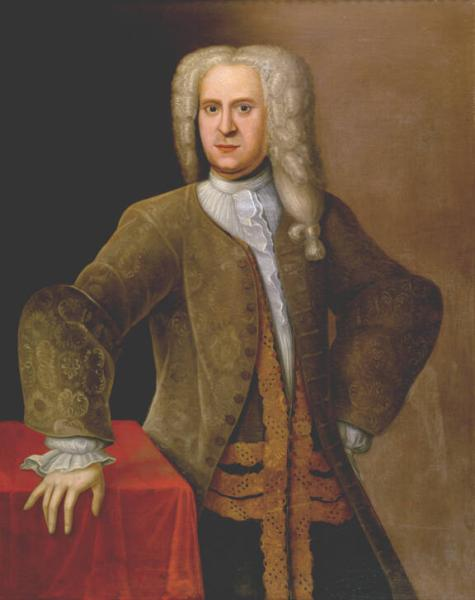

39th Mayor of New York City
- In office October 1739 – August 1744
- Preceded by: Paul Richard
- Succeeded by: Stephen Bayard

Personal details
- Born: 1678 Germany
- Died: August 13, 1744 (aged 65–66) New York City, Province of New York, British America
- Spouse: Maria Cuyler (m. 1703; died 1724)
- Children: 7, including John Cruger Jr.

John Cruger (1678/1680 – August 13, 1744) was an immigrant to colonial New York with an uncertain place of birth, but his family was originally Danish. In New York from at least 1696, he became a prosperous merchant and established a successful family. He served as an alderman for twenty-two years and as 39th Mayor of New York City from 1739 until his death in 1744.

== Early life ==
Cruger was likely born in early 1678 in Germany, although the family is supposed to be of Danish origin (or German). In 1698, Cruger came to America from Bristol, England, when New York was officially an English colony, but still very much marked by the remains of the Dutch influence of New Netherland.

== Career ==
After moving to the Province of New York, he entered the mercantile firm of Onziel Van Swieden and Valentine Cruger as a shipmaster, slave-trader, and factor and, by 1702, he had become a junior partner, owning ships of his own. In 1698 on a voyage to Madagascar he was robbed and had his ship stolen by pirates Abraham Samuel and Evan Jones, making his way back aboard a passing slave ship. Cruger gained citizenship shortly afterwards, being recognized as a Freeholder of the Province on March 2, 1703.

In 1712, he was elected Alderman for the Dock Ward, a post he would hold until 1735, when he became assistant to the Mayor Paul Richard. He had sent his older sons overseas to run parts of the business; Tileman to the West Indies, and Henry to Bristol in England, while he kept John at home to take charge in New York.

By 1739, he and his family had even abandoned his Dutch Reformed Church, becoming members of the Anglican Communion at the politically important Trinity Church. As mayor, he is remembered for the ruthless suppression of what became known as the Negro Plot of 1741. In October of that year, he was appointed as Mayor of New York, serving five one year terms. While Cruger was mayor, the Recorder of New York City (essentially the deputy mayor of the City), was Daniel Horsmanden.

== Personal life ==
On March 5, 1703, he married heiress Maria Cuyler (1678–1724) of New York. Maria was the sister of Albany Mayor Johannes Cuyler (himself the father of mayor Cornelis Cuyler and uncle of mayor Dirck Ten Broeck), who married Elsje Ten Broeck, and Sarah Cuyler, who married Albany Mayor Pieter Van Brugh. The family would eventually include three sons and four daughters who survived infancy. Their children included:

- Anna Cruger (1704–1744)
- Tileman Cruger (1705–1730), who died in New York.
- Henry Cruger (1707–1780), who served in the New York Assembly. He married Hannah Slaughter in 1734. After her death, he married Elizabeth Harris in 1736.
- John Cruger Jr. (1710–1791), who also served as mayor and Speaker of the Provincial Assembly.
- Sarah Cruger (1714–1766), who married Nicholas Gouverneur (grandparents of Samuel Gouverneur) in 1745.
- Maria Cruger (1715–1787)
- Rachel Cruger (1721–1775).

Cruger died in New York City on August 13, 1744. When he died, his will left his thriving commercial empire to his surviving sons, John and Henry. He also returned in his will to his religious roots. He was buried in the churchyard of the Low Dutch Reformed Church in Harlem. The graveyard is long gone, but the church is now the Elmendorf Reformed Church in East Harlem.

=== Descendants ===
Through his son Henry, he was the grandfather of Henry Cruger Jr. (1739–1827), who was a Member of Parliament in Great Britain and, later, a New York State senator. Henry Cruger Sr. was also the father of Nicholas Cruger whose Beekman and Cruger was the employer of Alexander Hamilton as a young teen in Saint Croix, Danish West Indies.

== See also ==
- Abraham Samuel, a pirate turned Malagasy king whom he encountered while on a trip to Madagascar.
