= Saint Augustin, Madagascar =

Saint Augustin Ianantsony
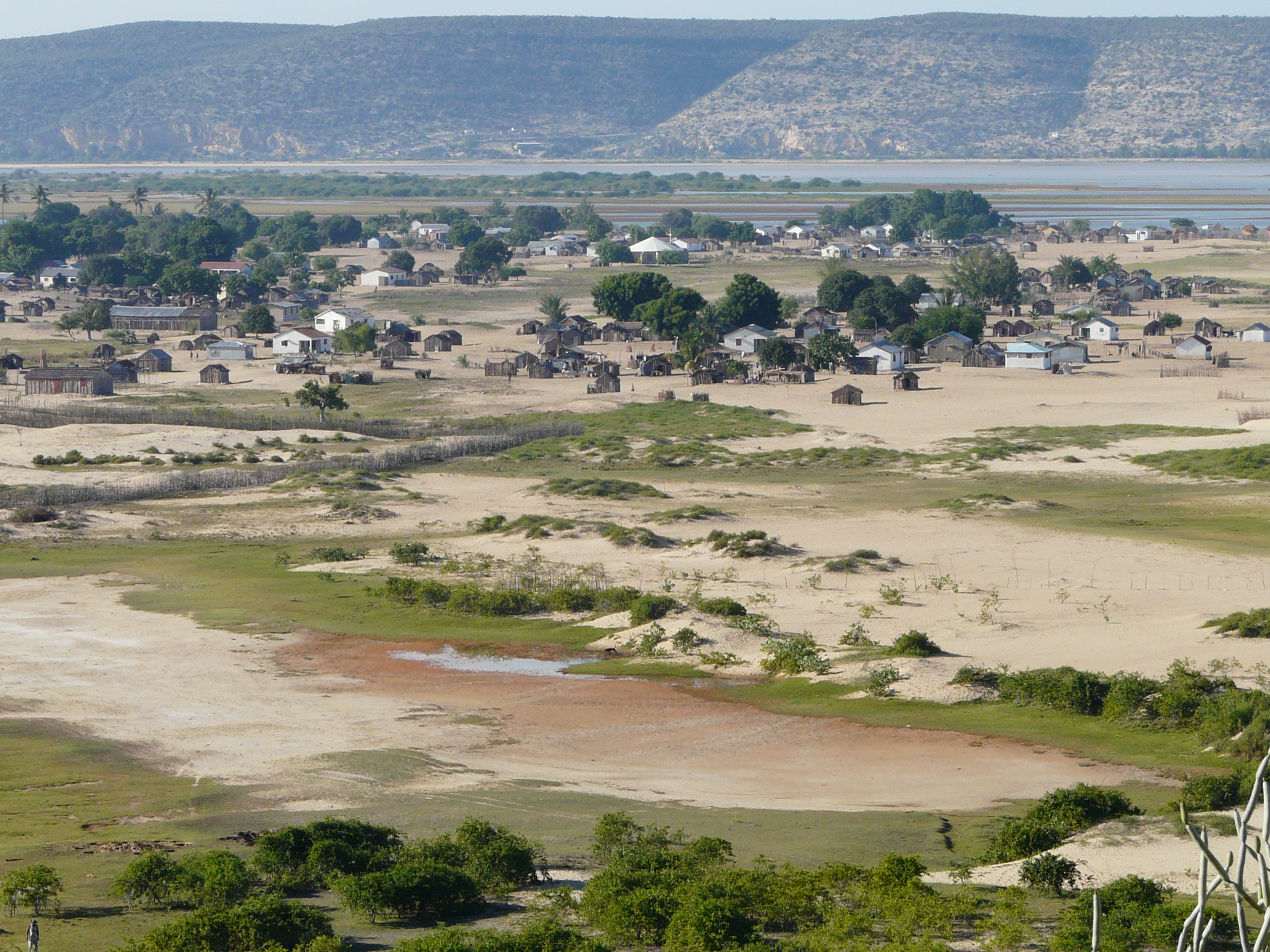
- Saint Augustin

- Location in Madagascar
- Coordinates: 23°33′S 43°46′E
- Country: Madagascar
- Province: Toliara
- Region: Atsimo-Andrefana
- District: Toliara II
- Elevation: 39 m (128 ft)

Population (2001)
  - Total: 15,000
- Time zone: UTC3 (EAT)
- Postal code: 602

Saint Augustin (also known as Ianantsony; Malagasy: Anantsono) is a rural municipality in Madagascar. It belongs to the district of Toliara II, which is a part of Atsimo-Andrefana Region. The population of the commune was estimated to be approximately 15,000 in 2001 commune census. The mouth of the Onilahy River is near the town.

== History ==
England's Courteen association attempted to sponsor a colony nearby in 1645 but by 1646 famine, disease, and conflict with the Malagasy drove the English settlers away and the colony failed. Pirates such as John Pro, Thomas White, Samuel Burgess, and John Halsey frequented the area in the early 18th century. Ex-pirate John Rivers established a pirate settlement at Saint Augustin, resupplying passing ships for a fee and trading in slaves; his trading post lasted from 1686 until his death in 1719.

== Demographics ==
The majority 60% of the population work in fishing. 23% are farmers, while an additional 10% receives their livelihood from raising livestock. The most important crops are sweet potatoes and rice; also lima beans is an important agricultural product. Services provide employment for 7% of the population.

== Education ==
Primary and junior level secondary education are available in town.

== Geography ==
It is situated south of Toliara (Tuléar) at the mouth of the Onilahy River to the Bay of Saint-Augustin and the Indian Ocean.

There used to be a ferry over the Onilahy to Soalara but it broke down. It is necessary to take small outrigger canoes or to make the trip around the bay (250 km) since 2021.
