= John Cruger Jr. =

American politician

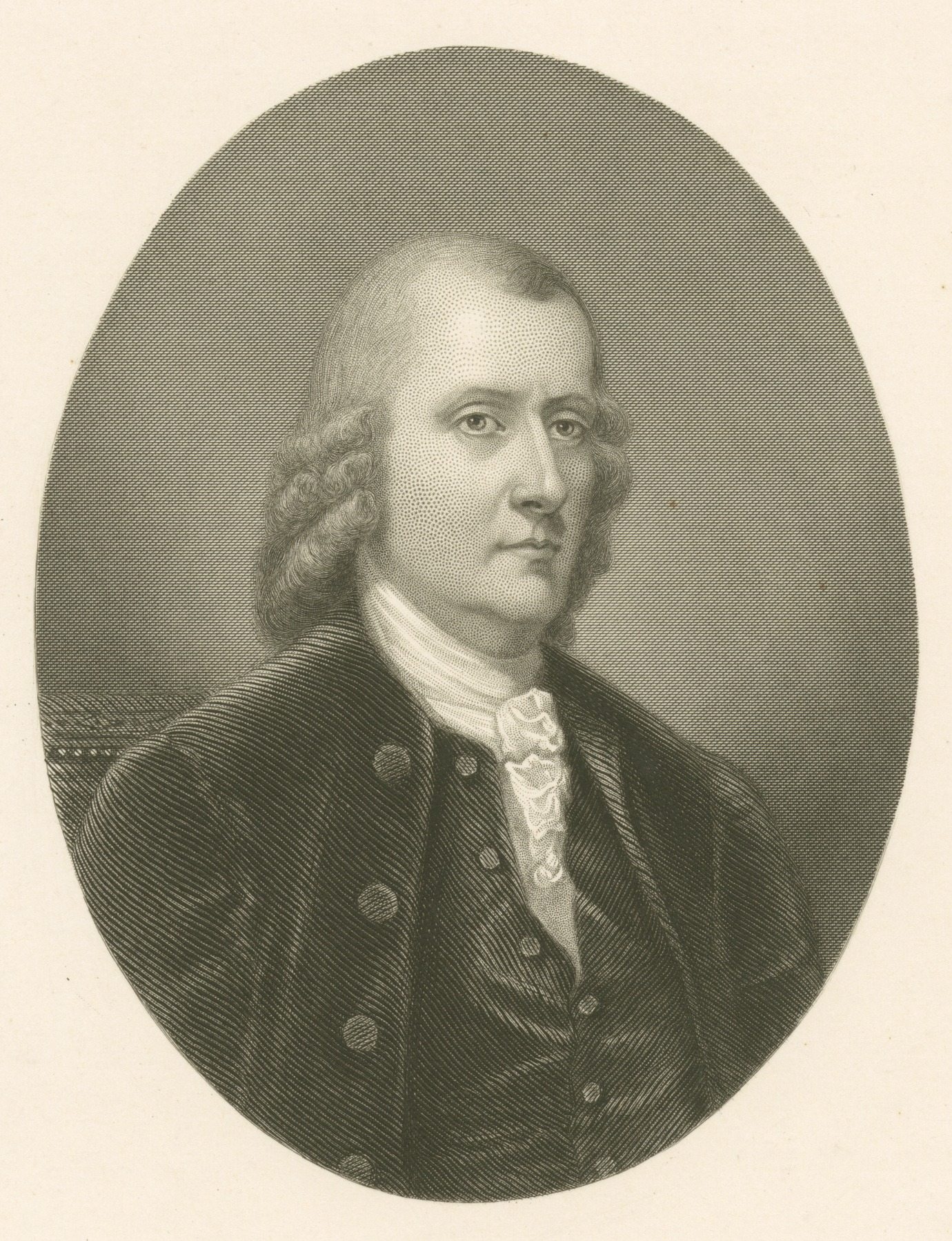

42nd Mayor of New York City
- In office 1757–1766
- Preceded by: Edward Holland
- Succeeded by: Whitehead Hicks

Personal details
- Born: July 18, 1710 New York City
- Died: December 27, 1791 (aged 81) New York City
- Parent(s): John Cruger; Maria Cuyler

John Cruger Jr. (July 18, 1710 – December 27, 1791) was the speaker of the Province of New York assembly and the 42nd Mayor of New York City.

He was born July 18, 1710, the son of John Cruger and Maria Cuyler. He was a New York City merchant. He served as the 42nd Mayor of New York City from 1757 to 1766. He was also a member of New York's delegation to the Stamp Act Congress and a member of the Committee of Correspondence.

He was the speaker of the Province of New York assembly from 1769 to 1775. In the New York assembly, he voted against approval of the proceedings of the First Continental Congress. He was named as one of the "suspected" persons on the New York Provincial Congress in 1776.

Before the British occupation of New York City, he retired to Kinderhook. He returned to New York City in 1783 and died December 27, 1791.
