= John Rivers (pirate) =

English pirate (died 1719)

John Rivers (died 1719) was a pirate best known for leading a settlement and trading post on Madagascar.

== History ==
The English Courteen Association attempted to sponsor a colony at St. Augustine on the south-western Madagascar coast. Colonists landed in 1645 but by the following year disease, famine, and conflict with the native Malagasy reduced their numbers too far and the colonists fled; within a few decades the bay surrounding St. Augustine was a favorite stopping point for pirates.

Ex-pirate Rivers set up a small settlement and trading post at St. Augustine in 1686. He charged trading fees to merchants and slavers who came to exchange goods. Fellow pirate John Halsey visited St. Augustine Bay in 1705, as did John Bowen and Thomas White. Castaway sailor Robert Drury survived the loss of the Degrave in 1703 and spent many years in service to various native Kings, as well as visiting John Pro and other ex-pirate traders. In his memoir he recalled how Samuel Burgess traveled to St. Augustine to buy slaves. Drury often searched for a way to escape the island, looking for a place where American or European ships might stop so he could beg for passage. He was not enthusiastic about his chances of finding passage off Madagascar from St. Augustine:

“And when I came to consider that ships come to this country, and the poor condition of St. Augustine Bay rendered it very unlikely they should come to trade there, I did not find; but I was by this providence likely to get sooner to England than any other place where I had yet been.”

Rivers died in 1719, the same year as fellow pirate traders Pro and Thomas Collins. (Note: Like Drury, Collins was also a Degrave survivor. Halsey, when he visited the island, also picked up some more Degrave castaways.)

== See also ==
Other ex-pirates who established trading posts on or near Madagascar:

- Abraham Samuel – Pirate in the late 1690s
- Adam Baldridge – 17th-century English pirate
- James Plaintain – 18th-century English pirate
