= Collettsville, North Carolina =

Unincorporated community in North Carolina, United States

- Unincorporated community
- Interactive map of Collettsville, North Carolina
- Coordinates: 35°55′32″N 81°40′28″W
- Country: United States
- State: North Carolina
- Counties: Caldwell
- ZIP Code: 28611
- Area code: 828

Collettsville (pronounced coh-lets-ville) is an unincorporated community in Caldwell County, North Carolina, United States. It is part of the Hickory–Lenoir–Morganton Metropolitan Statistical Area.

== Housing ==
Although there are many houses made with a Gothic design, there are also many houses that look like cabins, built out of plain wood. Some houses are estimated to have been built as early as 1900 and are now occupied by locals.

=== Railroad service ===
When the Chester & Lenoir Narrow Gauge Railroad arrived in Lenoir, North Carolina in 1884, it sparked "railroad fever" in the area. A number of companies offered stock and subscription for railroad construction, but none were built.

However, in 1891, a charter was issued to the Caldwell Land& Lumber Company for construction of a railroad. In 1893, a line was constructed from Lenoir to Collettsville, and was named the Caldwell & Northern Railroad. At completion, the line owned two locomotives, one passenger car, and twenty-one (21) flatcars. It was little more than a logging line that supported the numerous furniture factories in and around Lenoir.

The Caldwell & Northern Railroad gradually expanded its operations southwesterly and made money for its owners. By 1903, it had extended the line up Wilson Creek when it ran out of funds. The Carolina & Northwestern Railway gained control of the line in 1905, but operated it as a separate entity. The tracks were extended up Wilson Creek to Mortimer, and by 1906 it made it to Edgemont.

In 1910, the line was merged into the Carolina & Northwestern Railway to provide better service to its customers.
