= Gameren =

- Village
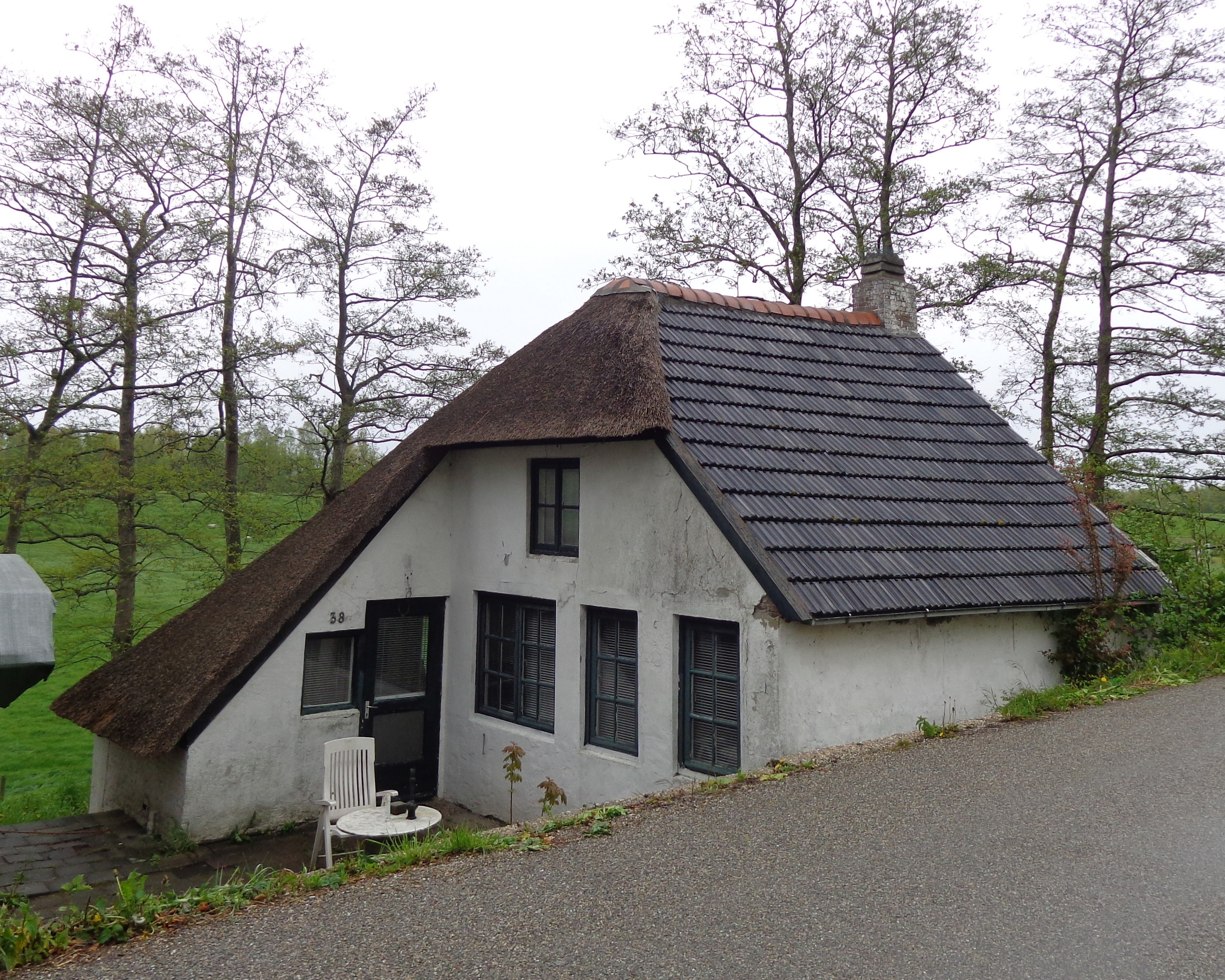
- House on the dike

- Coat of arms

- Location in the Netherlands Gameren (Netherlands)
- Coordinates: 51°48′4″N 5°12′1″E
- Country: Netherlands
- Province: Gelderland
- Municipality: Zaltbommel

Area
  - Total: 13.26 km^{2} (5.12 sq mi)
- Elevation: 3 m (9.8 ft)

Population (2021)
  - Total: 3,000
  - Density: 230/km^{2} (590/sq mi)
- Time zone: UTC+1 (CET)
  - Summer (DST): UTC+2 (CEST)
- Postal code: 5311
- Dialing code: 0418

Gameren is a village in the Dutch province of Gelderland. It is a part of the municipality of Zaltbommel, and lies about 14 km (8.7 mi) northwest of 's-Hertogenbosch.

Gameren was a separate municipality until 1955, when it was merged with Kerkwijk.

== History ==
The village was first mentioned in 1146 as Gamberem, and means "settlement on the Gamber (river)". Gameren developed into a stretched out esdorp along the Waal. The Protestant Church dates from around 1860, and in 1920 a clergy house was attached to the church. In 1840, Gameren was home to 1,042 people. In 2004, many members of the Reformed Church did not want to join the united Protestant Church, and formed the Restored Reformed Church. In 2014, they opened their own church building without approximately 350 seats.

== Gallery ==
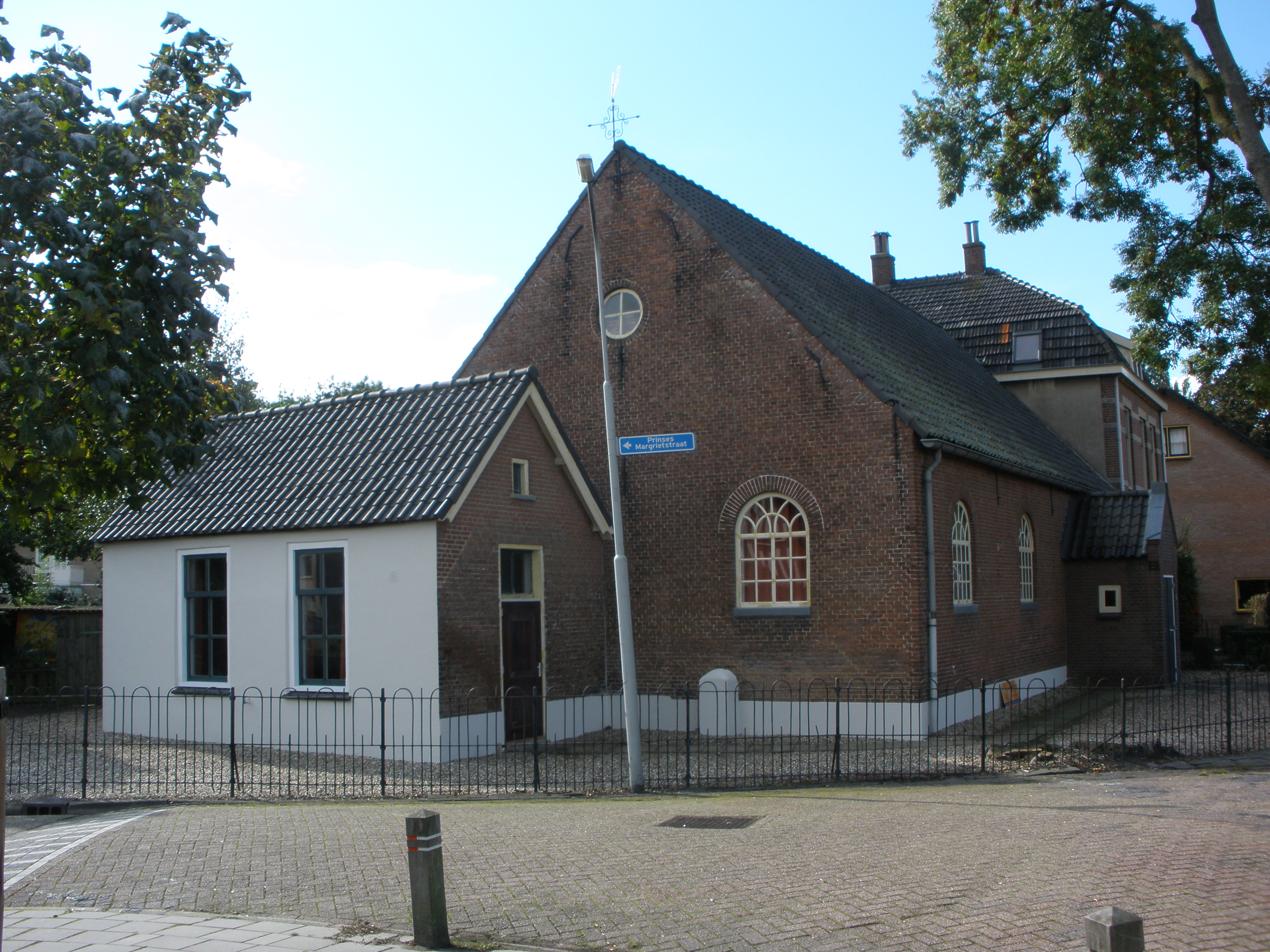
Protestant Church

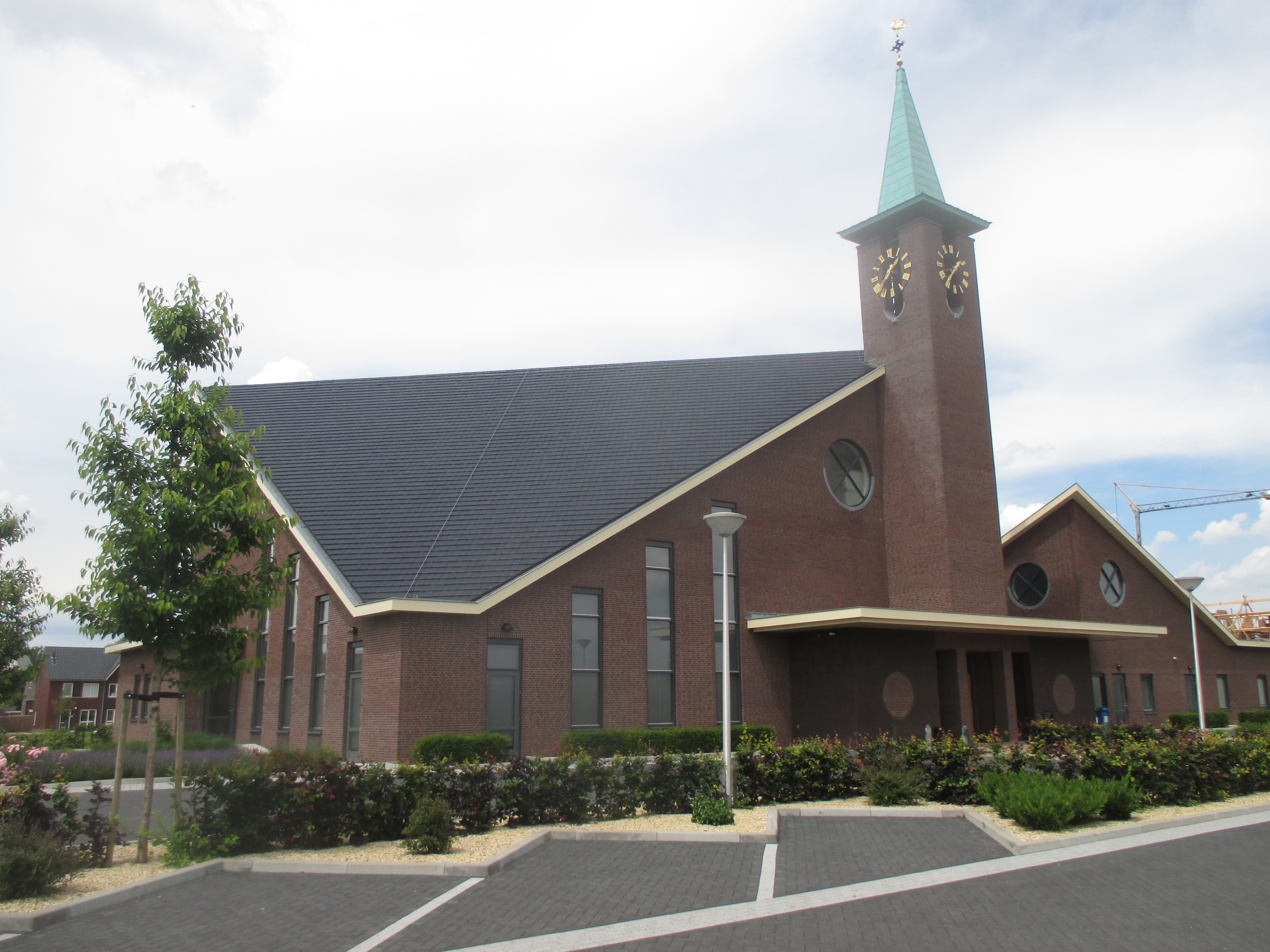
Restored Reformed Church

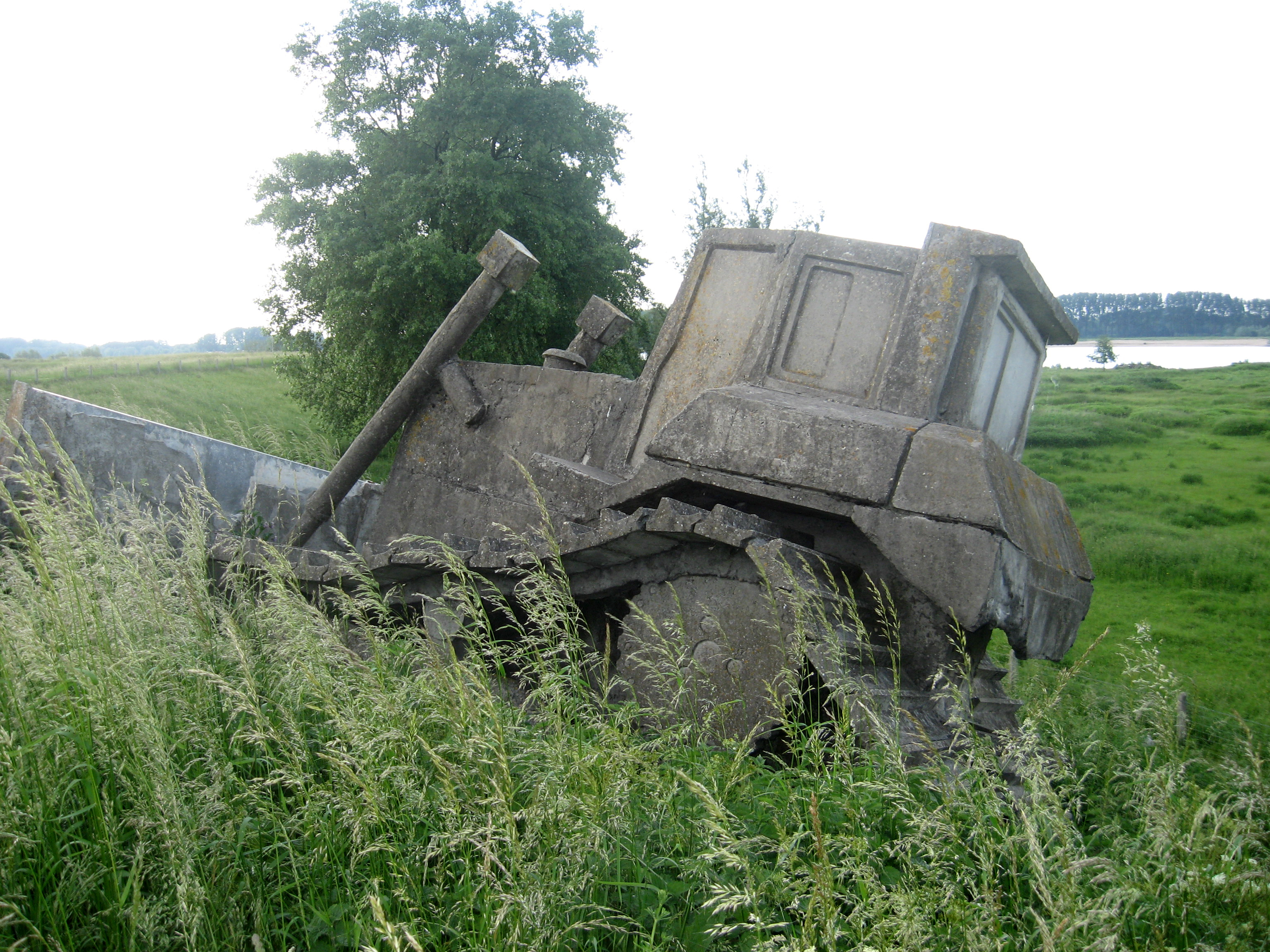
Art in Gameren

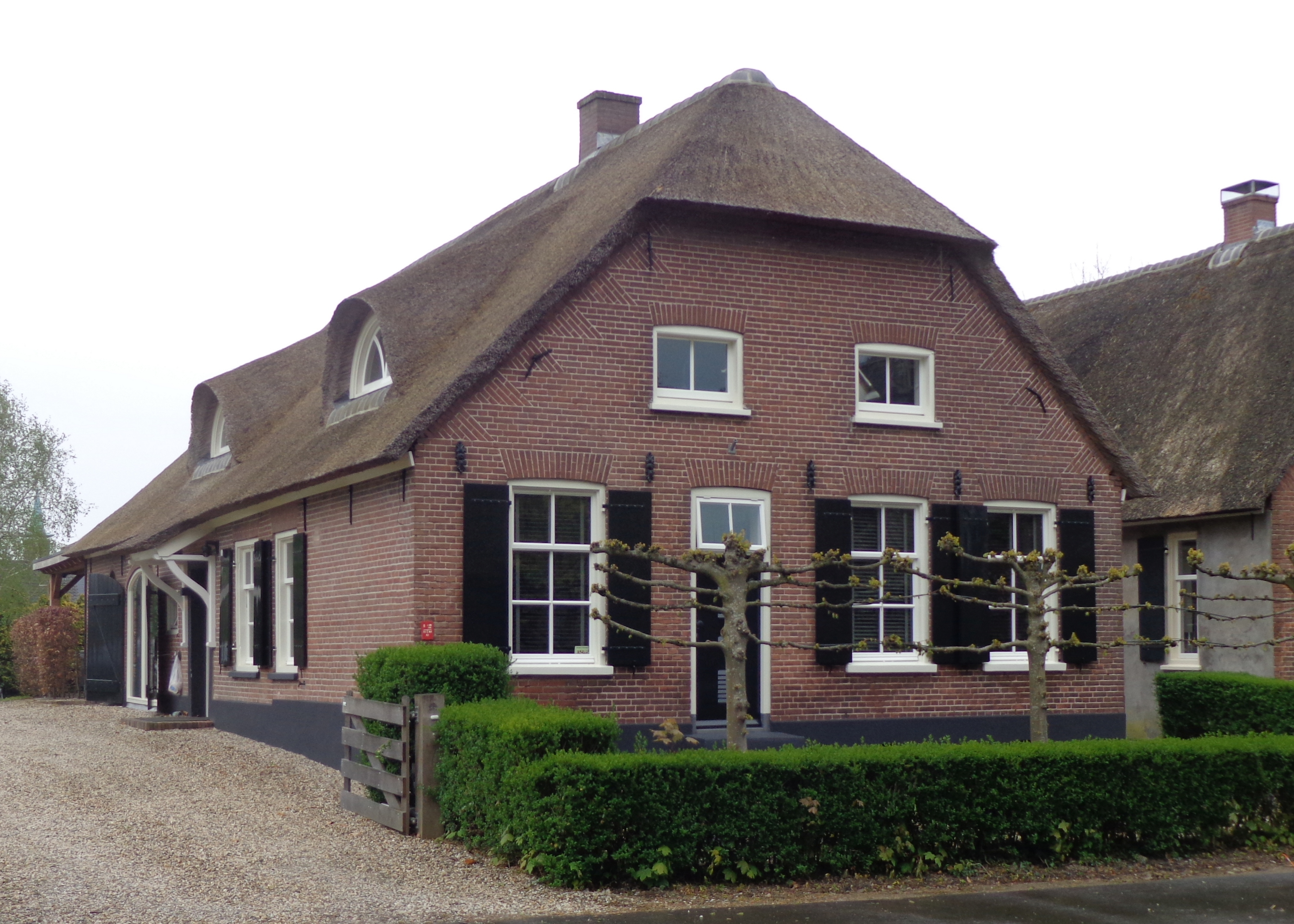
House in Gameren
