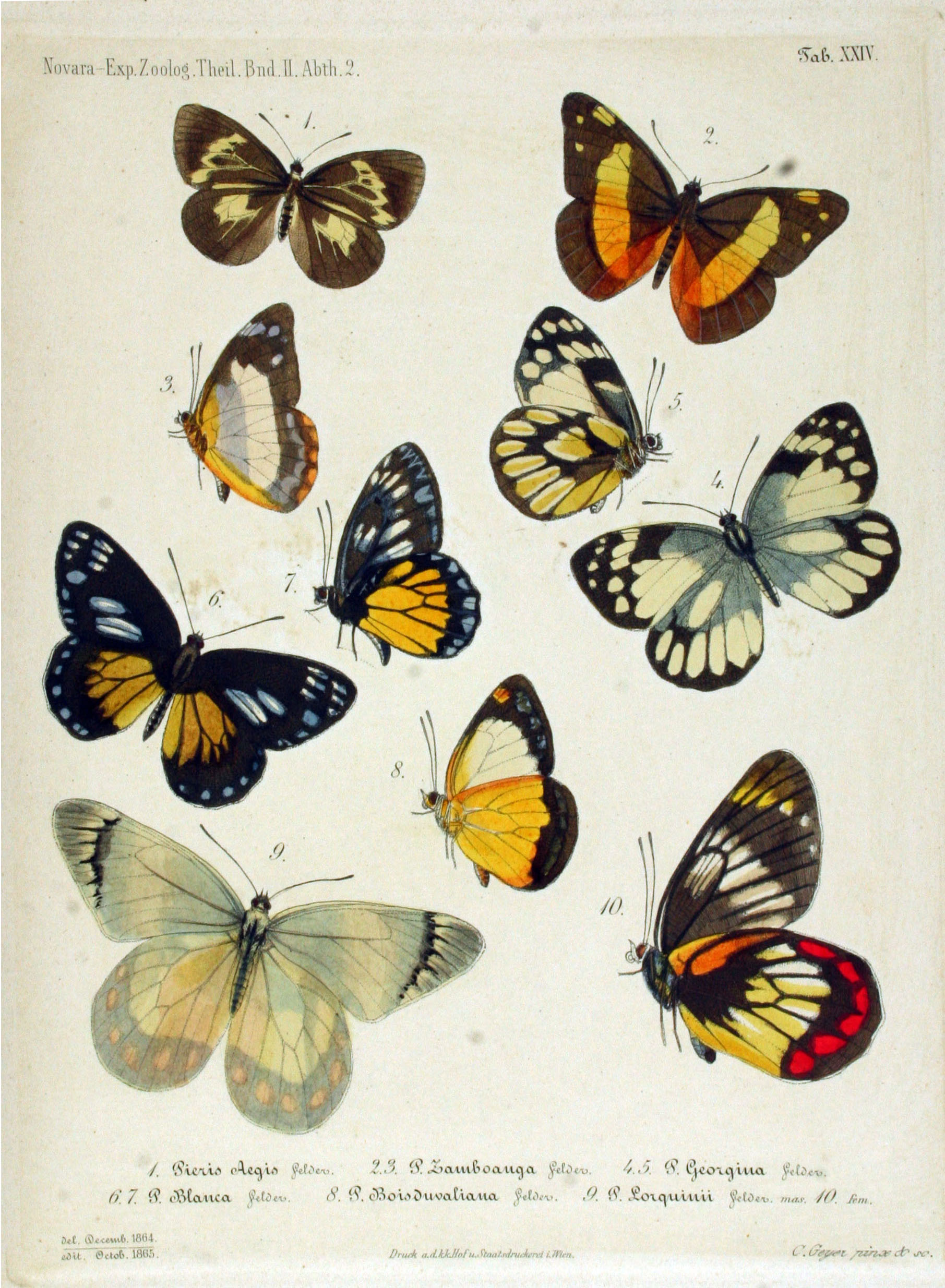
- In C. and R. Felders' Reise der Österreichischen Fregatte Novara 1865

Scientific classification
- Kingdom: Animalia
- Phylum: Arthropoda
- Class: Insecta
- Order: Lepidoptera
- Family: Pieridae
- Genus: Delias
- Species: D. georgina

Binomial name
- Delias georgina (C. Felder & R. Felder, 1861)

= Delias georgina =

Species of butterfly

Delias georgina is a butterfly in the family Pieridae. It was described by Cajetan Felder and Rudolf Felder in 1861. It is found in the Indomalayan realm,

== Description ==
Distinguished by the rounded form of the wings. Male:The forewing underside has a white ground-colour.The hindwing is glossed in a coffee colour. The hindwing underside is yellow and has dark markings. Female : underside wing surface darker than male with broader margins on both wings.The hindwing underside has a coffee-brown ground colour, with chrome-yellow markings with white edging to most of the spots. The forewing has a extended proximal white area, with black dusting at the base. The submarginal spots are well marked. There are black coloured submarginal bands on both wings upper side.

== Subspecies ==
- Delias georgina georgina Philippines (Luzon)
- D. g. tahanica Rothschild, 1925 Malaya
- D. g. orphne (Wallace, 1867) Malaya (Malacca, Mt. Ophir) white instead of yellow under surface to the forewing and the black bands on it only extend to the apex of the cell.
- D. g. zenobia Pendlebury, 1939 Malaya (central mountains)
- D. g. keda Talbot, [1937] Malaya (Kedah Peak)
- D. g. simanabum Hagen, 1894 Sumatra poor in colour and markings, with yellowish white upper surface, white under surface to the forewing, which only bears 2 yellowish apical spots, and pale yellow under surface to the hindwing, on which [only] vestiges of the black apical spots in the middle of the wing still remain.
- D. g. cinerascens Mitis, 1893 N.Borneo, Sarawak Upper surface of the males white with slight grey apical shade. Female broadly margined with black, with grey base to the forewing and yellowish discal area on the hindwing.
