= Evan Jones (pirate) =

Evan Jones (fl. 1698-1699, first name occasionally Achen) was a Welsh-born pirate from New York active in the Indian Ocean, best known for his indirect connection to Robert Culliford and for capturing a future Mayor of New York.

== History ==
The slave ship Beckford Galley (sometimes Bedford Galley) left England in June 1698 for west Africa and Madagascar under Captain John Harris, who was notoriously cruel to his crew. When they put in at Tulear on Madagascar in late 1698 or early 1699, the crew conspired with a number of pirates from ashore, led by John Ryder. He had been a gunner on one of Emperor Aurangzeb's ships and had been aboard the frigate Mocha when Robert Culliford mutinied and seized it. Culliford accepted a general pardon for pirates offered at Île Sainte-Marie but Ryder and several others remained behind where they’d made their way to Tulear. Ryder's group and Beckford Galley's crew murdered Harris, stole the ship, and put ashore anyone unwilling to turn to piracy. The unwilling crew reported Ryder's attack, resulting in the Council of Trade and Plantations issuing warnings about Ryder to governors of the American colonies in case they headed back across the Atlantic.

The pirates elected Evan Jones as their new captain, with Ryder as his quartermaster. Sailing back up the coast of western Africa, they had little success. At Abraham Samuel’s pirate trading port in St. Augustine, they encountered the slave ship Prophet Daniel under Captain Appel; his cargo master was John Cruger, who was later an alderman in New York, and eventually mayor. Jones pulled alongside Prophet Daniel, hailed them, and invited them to drink ashore. Cruger and some of his crew recognized Jones and a few of his sailors as fellow denizens of Westchester, New York, and never suspected treachery. At a signal that night, Jones' men boarded Prophet Daniel and seized it. Cruger hired some of Samuel's warriors to attack the two ships with musket fire from shore, but they had little effect. When Cruger tried to have Samuel's men cut the ships’ anchor cables, Samuel revealed that Jones had paid him off, promising him slaves and the Prophet Daniel. Jones and Beckford Galley sailed away, with some of Prophet Daniel's crew (and possibly Appel as well) aboard. Samuel confiscated all of Cruger's guns and supplies and sold Prophet Daniel to Edward Woodman and three other pirates, while Cruger was forced to buy passage back to New York aboard a merchantman. There is some evidence that New York merchant Frederick Philipse may have been involved in Prophet Daniel's capture; Philipse had long been involved in trading goods to pirates in exchange for slaves, and had a rival slave-ship in the area at the time. Jones tried to recruit other Madagascar pirates to Beckford Galley, some of whom refused (a few who had sailed with Robert Colley and Joseph Wheeler), preferring like Culliford to accept a pardon and wait for a passing merchant to return them to America.

By September 1699 the ship (possibly renamed Tulear Galley or "Tolier Galley") needed repairs. Returning to Tulear, they captured a brigantine which they sank after looting it for supplies and slaves, again putting ashore anyone who refused to join them. They then cruised up the eastern coast of Africa taking several small ships. Returning to St. Augustine to careen, they beached the ship carelessly and broke its keel. Jones and Ryder’s further activities are not known; one source said they later joined Culliford’s crew. Among Jones' crew was future pirate Captain David Williams, who would also go on to sail with Culliford as well as under a number of other Madagascar-based pirate captains.

As a New York alderman years later, Cruger remembered his ordeal with Jones' pirates. Captain Peter Solgard of HMS Greyhound engaged pirates Edward Low and Charles Harris off Delaware Bay in 1723, mauling Low's ship and driving him off while capturing Harris after a lengthy battle. Cruger was among the aldermen who rewarded Solgard for his bravery.

== See also ==
- Capture of the schooner Fancy – a description of Solgard's battle against Harris and Low.
