= Richard Felder =

American chemical engineer

Richard M. Felder (born 1939 in New York City) is the Hoechst Celanese Professor Emeritus of Chemical Engineering at North Carolina State University.

== Education and career history ==
Felder received a BChE degree from the City College of New York in 1962 and a Ph.D. in chemical engineering from Princeton University in 1966 after completing a doctoral dissertation titled "Energy distributions of energetic atoms in irradiated media." He spent a year as a NATO Postdoctoral Fellow at the Atomic Energy Research Establishment (Harwell, England) and then two years as a research engineer at Brookhaven National Laboratory. In 1969 he joined the chemical engineering faculty at North Carolina State University, and he retired to emeritus status in 1999. He spent sabbatical semesters at the University of Colorado (1982), Georgia Tech (1990), the Carnegie Foundation for the Advancement of Teaching (2003), and Smith College (2006).

== Professional contributions ==
=== Engineering research ===
For roughly the first half of his career, Felder carried out research on a variety of topics, starting with his doctoral and postdoctoral research on energy distributions of energetic atoms in irradiated media, progressing through mathematical modeling of mixing and diffusion in chemical reactors, fluidized bed gasification of coal, and diffusion of gases and vapors in polymer membranes, and concluding with stochastic modeling of specialty chemicals manufacturing processes. He has authored or coauthored over 300 papers on chemical process engineering and engineering and science education.

=== Introductory chemical engineering textbook ===
Felder coauthored Elementary Principles of Chemical Processes, a text for the introductory chemical engineering course, with Ronald W. Rousseau and (in the fourth edition) Lisa G. Bullard. The book first appeared in 1978 and became the standard textbook for the introductory chemical engineering course in the United States. It has been adopted by more than 90% of all U.S. chemical engineering departments and at many institutions in other countries, and has been translated into Spanish, Portuguese, Chinese, and Korean.

=== Research and writing on teaching and learning ===
Beginning in the late 1980s, Felder shifted his career focus from disciplinary engineering research to education, including educational research. With Rebecca Brent, he coauthored Teaching and Learning STEM: A Practical Guide, a guidebook for instructors of science, technology, engineering, and mathematics courses, and he has authored or coauthored three education-related book chapters and over 120 education related articles and over 100 "Random Thoughts" columns in the quarterly journal Chemical Engineering Education. His research and publications deal with many aspects of teaching and learning, with his primary emphasis being on student-centered instructional methods including active learning (involving students in course-relevant activities during classes rather than relying entirely on lecturing as the medium of instruction) and cooperative learning (getting students to complete assignments and projects in teams under conditions that include holding all team members individually accountable for all of the work done). Felder discussed his teaching philosophy in an interview in the Journal of Science Education in 2002.

=== Faculty development ===
Felder has given over 300 education-related seminars and—with his wife and colleague, Rebecca Brent—over 300 teaching workshops on campuses throughout the United States and abroad. He is the co-founder (with James Stice) of the National Effective Teaching Institute sponsored by the American Society for Engineering Education, and co-directed it from 1991 through 2015.

=== Index of Learning Styles ===
Felder co-developed and validated an on-line instrument called the Index of Learning Styles that assesses students' preferences on four dimensions of a learning styles model he had previously co-developed with Linda K. Silverman.
