= Regnier Tongrelow =

Captain Regnier Tongrelow
- Occupation: Privateer
- Years active: 1704-1707
- Known for: Attacking the largest ships he could find
- Piratical career
- Base of operations: New England
- Commands: New York Galley Sea Flower Swallow

Regnier Tongrelow (fl. 1704-1707) was a prolific privateer who operated out of New England. He captured a large number of ships over a short career, sending most back to New York, and was known for attacking the largest ships he could find.

== History ==
Thought to be French or Dutch, Tongrelow took advantage of privateering opportunities sparked by Queen Anne's War. He is first recorded privateering in early 1704 when he was wounded while capturing several ships near Curacao, which he sent back to Rhode Island to be condemned. Another prize ship he sent back to New England appeared to locals to be a French privateer and was nearly attacked; the privateer prize crew jumped overboard and swam ashore, leading to suspicions that Tongrelow might have verged into piracy.

Tongrelow's sloop Swallow was reclaimed by its owners late in 1704, so he returned to New York before sailing out again in command of the sloop Sea Flower, which was lost at sea in early 1705. Tongrelow survived and reclaimed much of the loot he'd collected. In September he purchased a 200-ton, 18-gun ship and named it New York Galley, manning it with 120 sailors. Fellow privateers Adrian Claver and Thomas Penniston had meanwhile returned to port with a Spanish prize; Penniston, after repairing his own ship Setty, agreed to sail as Tongrelow's consort. They were joined by Nat Burches, whose small 27-man sloop served as the fleet's tender.

They set out that December alongside Otto Van Tuyl, who had taken command of Claver's ship Castel del Rey; on the way out of New York's harbor Van Tuyl's ship ran aground and was destroyed, killing him, while the others evaded worsening weather and sailed to the Caribbean. Raiding out of Bermuda and Barbados in early 1706, Penniston took several small vessels before he and Tongrelow captured most of a French convoy out of Petit-Goave.

In July 1706 Burches in his tiny vessel attacked a huge 600-ton, 24-gun, 250-man Spanish ship. Thanks to several lucky cannon shots the Spanish ship was forced to retreat and beached itself to escape. Burches told Tongrelow about the encounter, who tried unsuccessfully to find the vulnerable ship. Burches later found it himself and forced the Spaniards to relinquish all their rum and wine. Shortly afterwards, Penniston attacked two ships at once but was forced to retreat. He lost an arm in the fight and the Setty was badly damaged; it foundered and sank with all hands lost before reaching port.

Tongrelow joined with Dutch and Jamaican privateers to attack another convoy in September 1706, again capturing the largest opponent (Monserrat Merchant) himself, which he accompanied back to New York. He departed for another cruise in January 1707 alongside Burches. That April Tongrelow engaged a 36-gun, 160-man French ship off Hispaniola but was forced to retreat to Bonaire after several hours. After repairing his ship he raided off Havana, whose Governor sent two armed sloops in August to capture him; he in turn captured both. The exasperated Governor then assembled a three-ship flotilla to capture Tongrelow, who escaped, though Burches may have been lost in the area when he failed to make a planned rendezvous. Tongrelow's further activities are not recorded; he may have retired, as the New York Galley was soon noted under the command of a Captain Hardy.

== See also ==
- War of Spanish Succession – the European conflict which spilled into the Americas as “Queen Anne’s War.”
