= Justice Johns =

Justice Johns may refer to:

- Charles A. Johns (1857–1932), associate justice of the Oregon Supreme Court and associate justice of the Supreme Court of the Philippines
- Kensey Johns (judge) (1759–1848), chief justice of the Delaware Supreme Court
