= Amanda Felder =

American professional triathlete

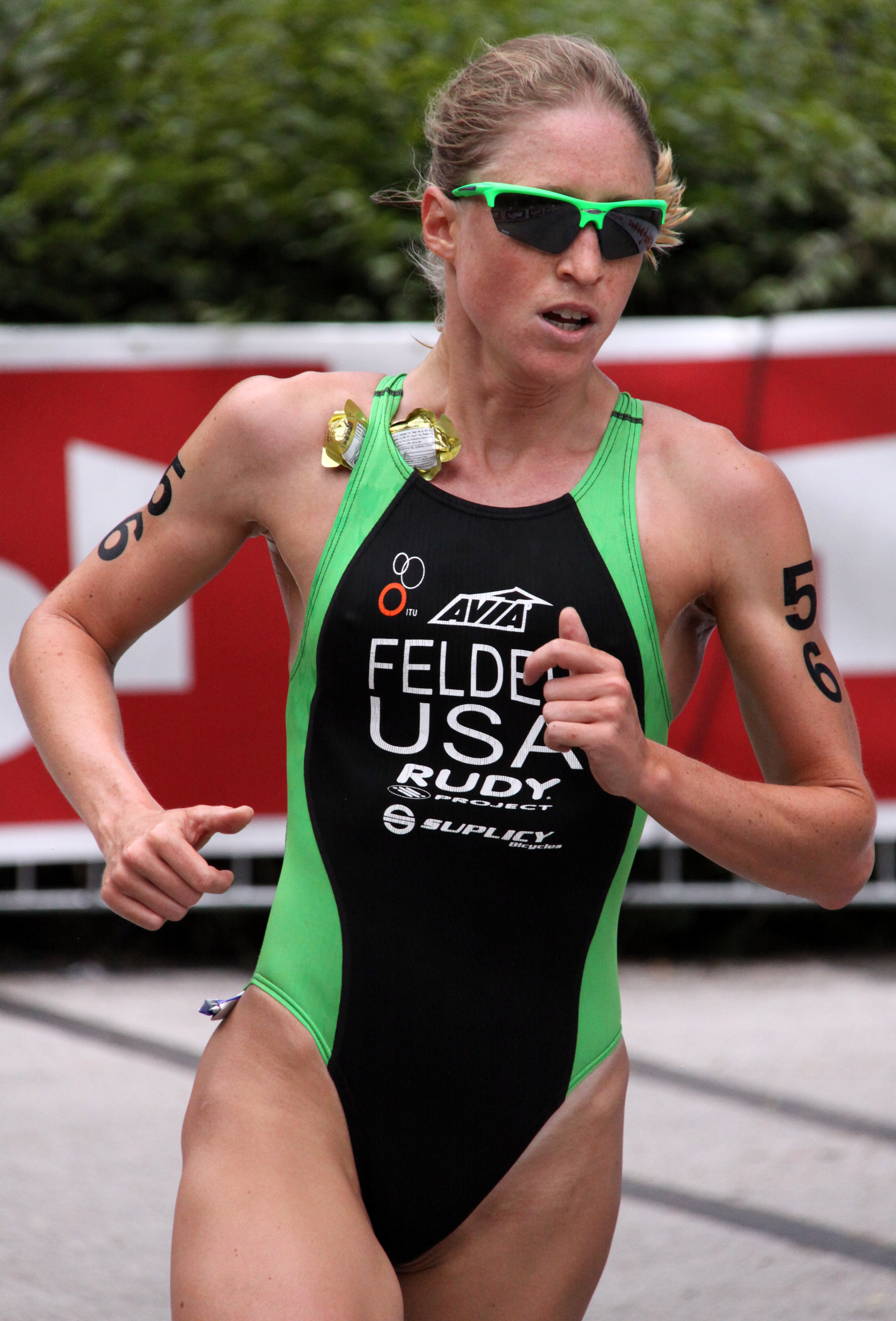
Amanda Felder at the World Championship Series triathlon in Kitzbühel, 2010.

Amanda Dawn Felder (born 16 January 1982 in Houston) is a professional US triathlete and Member of the USA Triathlon Project 2016 program.

Felder started her triathlon career in 2005 when she took part in, and won, the USA Triathlon Collegiate National Championship for the first time, as later on in 2008. Felder also takes part in Ironmen, e.g. she placed 7th at the Ironman 70.3 Miami on 30 October 2010.

Amanda Felder holds an undergraduate degree from Rice University and in March 2010 she was awarded a Ph.D. in Bioengineering from UC (University of California) San Diego. Felder resides in Cupertino.

== ITU Competitions ==
The following list is based upon the official ITU rankings and the athlete's Profile Page. All competitions are triathlons and belong to the Elite category.

Date	Competition	Place	Rank
2005-07-10	Pan American Cup	New York	14
2008-06-27	9th World University Championships	Erdek	20
2008-07-12	Pan American Cup	Musselman	DNS
2008-09-20	Premium Pan American Cup	Portland	13
2008-11-08	Premium Pan American Cup	San Francisco	11
2009-03-29	Pan American Cup	Lima	7
2009-04-25	Pan American Cup	Mazatlan	2
2009-05-16	PATCO Pan American Championships	Oklahoma	12
2009-05-23	Pan American Cup	Ixtapa	1
2009-06-21	Dextro Energy World Championship Series	Washington DC	30
2009-08-09	World Cup	Tiszaújváros	36
2009-08-22	Pan American Cup	Tuscaloosa	11
2009-11-08	World Cup	Huatulco	15
2010-03-20	Pan American Cup	Mazatlan	4
2010-04-04	Pan American Cup and South American Championships	Lima	3
2010-04-18	World Cup	Monterrey	23
2010-04-25	World Cup	Ishigaki	14
2010-06-05	Dextro Energy World Championship Series	Madrid	DNF
2010-07-10	Pan American Cup	San Francisco	4
2010-08-08	World Cup	Tiszaújváros	48
2010-08-14	Dextro Energy World Championship Series	Kitzbuhel	48
2010-08-21	Sprint World Championships	Lausanne	29
2010-09-25	Premium Pan American Cup	Tuscaloosa	17
2010-10-10	World Cup	Huatulco	DNF
2010-10-17	PATCO Pan American Championships	Puerto Vallarta	17

DNS = did not start · DNF = did not finish
