= St. John's Island =

St. John's Island or St. John Island may refer to:

- Saint John, U.S. Virgin Islands, an island of the U.S. Virgin Islands
- Saint John's Island, Singapore
- St. John's Island, Canada, former name of Prince Edward Island to 1798
- St. John's Island, Egypt
- Shangchuan Island or Saint John Island, China, originally from São João ("Saint John" in Portuguese)
- St. Ivan Island, in Bulgaria (Ivan is the Bulgarian name corresponding to John)
