= Abraham Samuel =

Pirate in the late 1690s

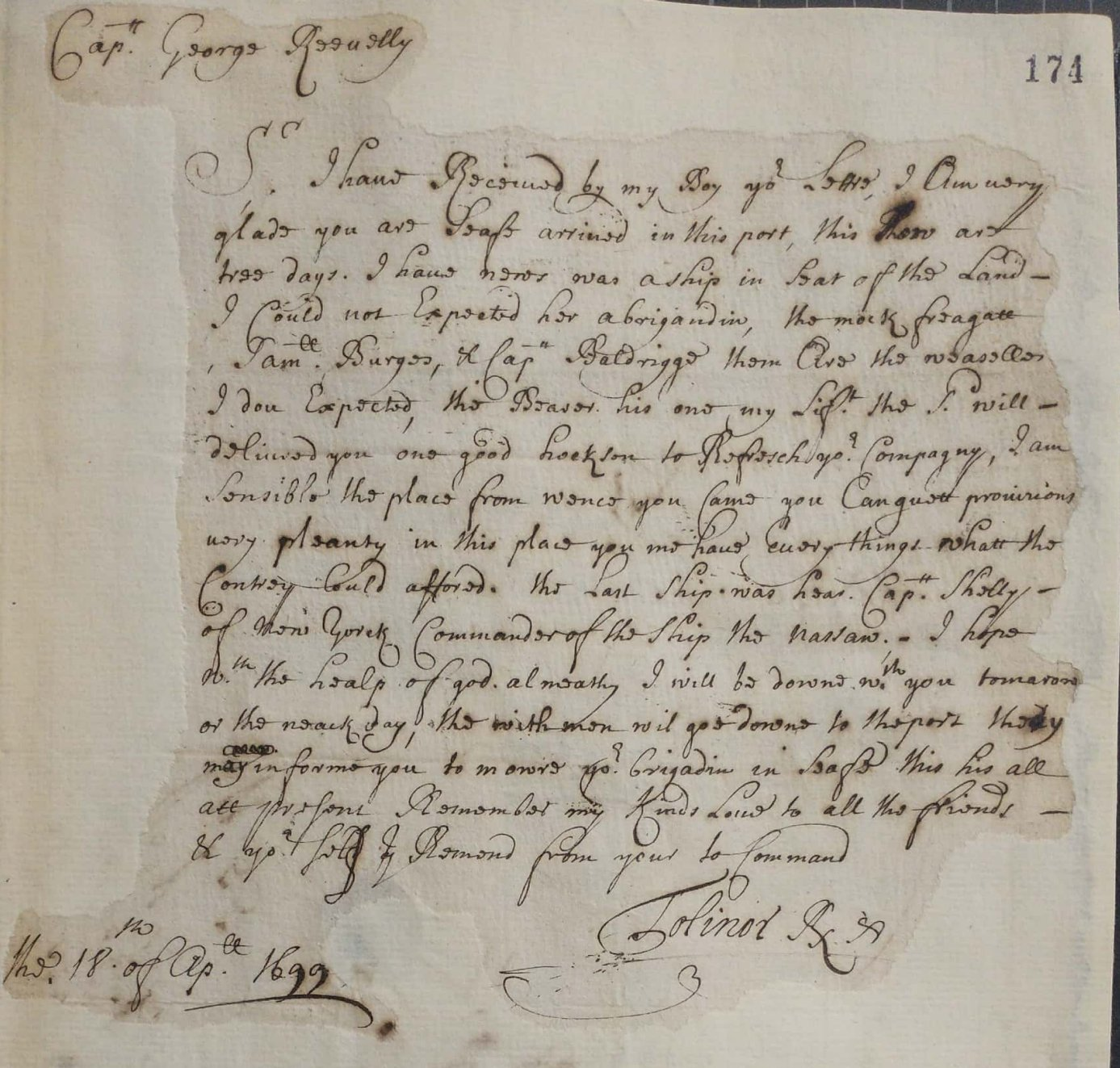
18 April 1699 Letter from Abraham Samuel, signed "Tolinar Rex"

Abraham Samuel (Note: Last name alternately spelled Samuel, Samuell, Samuels, or Samuells.) (died 1705), also known as "Deaan Tuley-Noro" or "Tolinar Rex", was a pirate of the Indian Ocean in the days of the Pirate Round in the late 1690s. He is thought to have been of mixed African and European ancestry. He was said to be born in Martinique or Jamaica, or possibly in Anosy, Madagascar. Shipwrecked on his way back to New York from Madagascar, he briefly led a combined pirate-Antanosy kingdom force from Fort Dauphin, Madagascar (modern Tôlanaro), from 1697 until he died there in 1705.

== History ==
In 1696, Samuel arrived in the Arabian Sea, serving as quartermaster under pirate captain John Hoar on his ship John and Rebecca. They put into trade at Adam Baldridge’s pirate outpost on Ile Ste. Marie in early 1697. Rebellious natives attacked Baldridge’s encampment and killed a number of pirates, including Hoar. Samuel and some surviving crewmen sailed the aging John and Rebecca down the eastern coast of Madagascar, seeking slaves to bring back to the New World with them. In October 1697, while at anchor in the harbor of abandoned French settlement Fort Dauphin, a storm came up which severed their anchor ropes and beached their ship. They took refuge in the abandoned fort while they waited for another ship to come rescue them. The elderly princess of the Antanosy king saw the shipwrecked sailors and noticed birthmarks on Samuel's body. She declared that Samuel was her long-lost son, whom her French husband (Note: Some sources (Grey, et al.) describe her former husband as English, and Samuel himself as Jamaican.) had taken when he left Fort Dauphin in 1674. He was given the title of Deaan Tuley-Noro (or Tolinar Rex): "Deaan, it may be observed, is a universal title of honour, signifying lord." With 20 heavily armed fellow pirates who served as his bodyguard plus 300 Antanosy soldiers, Samuel was proclaimed king of the region surrounding Fort Dauphin, eventually taking the title of "King of Fort Dauphin, Tollannare, Farrawe, Fanquest, and Fownzahíra". He had 15 large outrigger canoes and was constantly at war with the Antanosy king Diamarang Diamera.

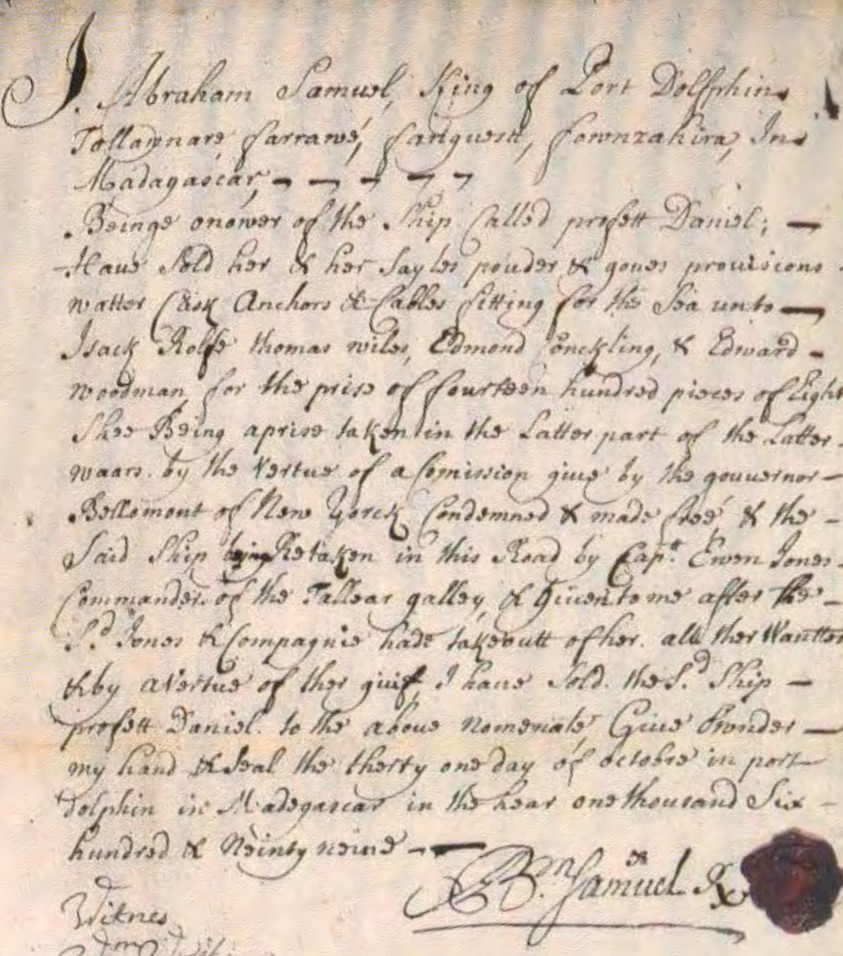
1699 Abraham Samuel Letter From the UK Public Records Office

In 1698, John Cruger was appointed as Supercargo under Captain Henry Appel of the New York slave ship Prophet Daniel. It was bound for Madagascar to purchase slaves and put in at Samuel's settlement at Fort Dauphin in August 1699. While Cruger was ashore, pirate Evan Jones anchored his ship Beckford Galley alongside the Prophet Daniel. His pirates partied with the Daniel's sailors, and that night seized and looted their ship. Cruger rushed back to the ship and had Samuel's soldiers attack the pirates with musket fire. When this was ineffective he tried to have Samuel's soldiers cut the ship's anchor cables. Samuel intervened and ordered his soldiers to stand down; when Cruger protested, Samuel robbed him of all the trade goods he'd brought, revealing that he'd been paid to assist the pirates. Cruger had antagonized his sailors during the voyage to Madagascar (a number of whom were owed back wages) and many of them willingly joined Jones, who sailed away to continue his own piracy. Samuel sold the Prophet Daniel to four other pirates led by Edward Woodman, giving them a signed bill of sale. The Prophet's previous captain, Henry Appel, joined the pirates as well. Cruger returned to New England aboard another slave ship and would go on to serve as the mayor of New York from 1739 until his death in 1744.

Samuel continued luring ships ashore to loot them, though on occasion he traded with them instead after charging them fees for "trading licenses". In 1700, the Royal Navy's Captain Littleton met with Samuel, entertaining him and two of his wives aboard his ship. The following year, the slave ship Degrave passed by "Port Dauphine", electing not to stop there because "the King of that part of the island was at enmity with all white men, and treated all the Europeans he met with very barbarously." The Degrave soon sank, leaving a few surviving sailors (including Robert Drury, who would later write an account of his ordeal) to make their way among the Malagasy natives.

Abraham Samuel was still King as of late 1705, leading his followers into battle against a neighboring kingdom despite his failing health. He died before the year was out. A Dutch slave ship anchored in Fort Dauphin in December 1706 to find Abraham Samuel no longer there and the new Antanosy king of the area unwilling to discuss what had happened to him. By 1707, another ship found Fort Dauphin again open for trading, this time led by Tom Collins, who had once been the Degrave's carpenter.

== See also ==
- Adam Baldridge and James Plaintain, two other ex-pirates who established trading posts on or near Madagascar.
- John Leadstone, an ex-pirate nicknamed "Old Captain Crackers" who established a similar trading post on the west coast of Africa.
