= Capture of the Grand Mughal Fleet =

1695 capture of Mughal vessels

- Part of the Golden Age of Piracy
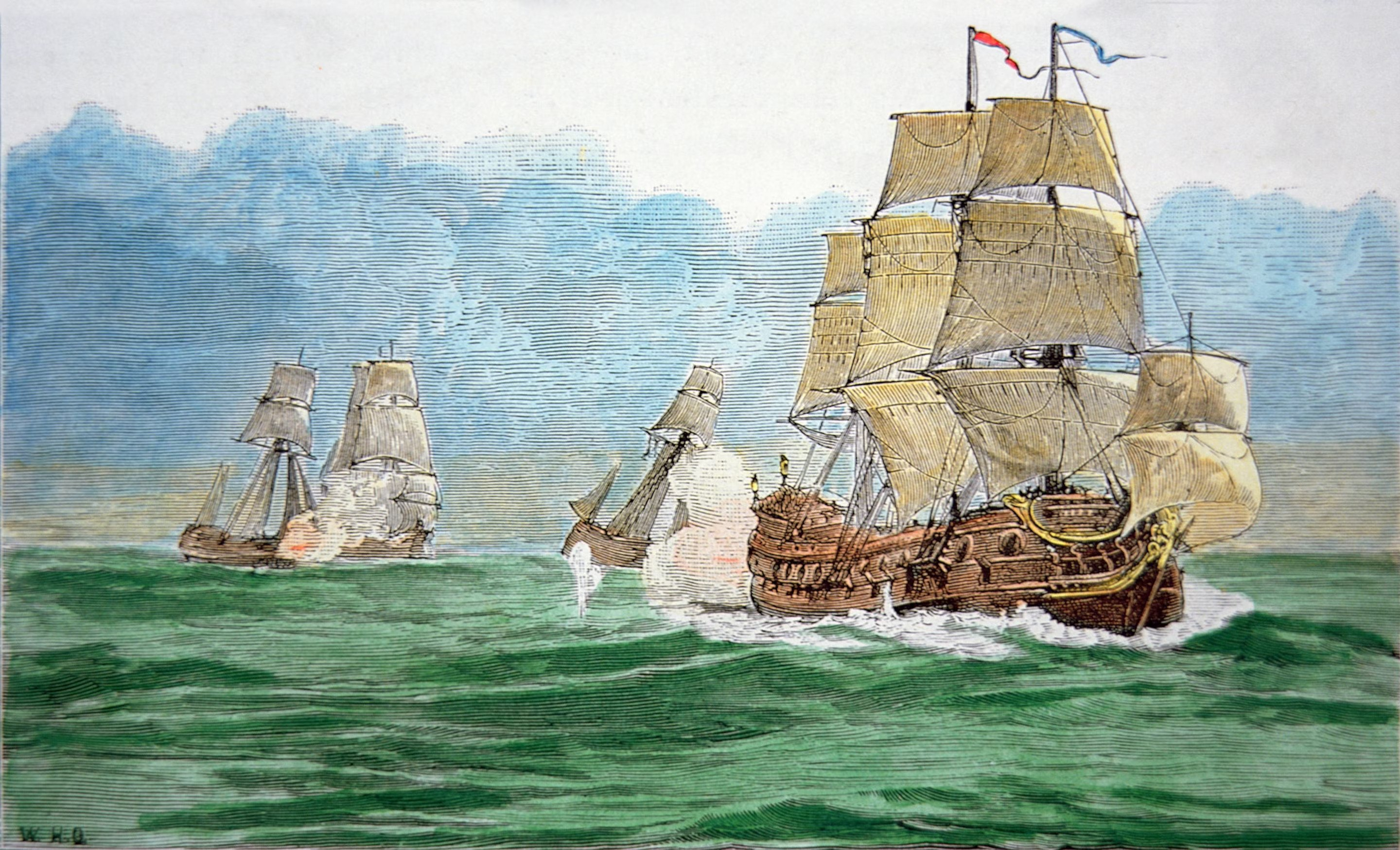
- Every's fleet captures the Ganj-i-sawai
Date	c. 7 September 1695
Location	Off Perim, Strait of Mandeb
Result	Pirate victory

Belligerents
Pirates	Mughal Empire

Commanders and leaders
Henry Every; Thomas Tew †; Richard Want; Joseph Faro; Thomas Wake; William May	Muhammad Ibrahim (POW)

Strength
6-ship convoy: 1 frigate (Fancy); 1 sloop-of-war (Amity); 2 brigantines (Dolphin and Pearl); 1 barque (Susannah); Portsmouth Adventure	25-ship convoy (including the ghanjah dhows Ganj-i-Sawai and Fateh Muhammed)

Casualties and losses
Several crew members killed	2 ships captured Several crew members captured and killed

The capture of the Great Mughal Fleet was an armed naval encounter in the history of piracy that targeted the Mughal Empire. On 7 September 1695, the English pirate Henry Every captured 2 ships out of the 25-ship convoy of Imperial Mughal vessels making the annual pilgrimage to Mecca, namely the treasure-laden Mogul ship known as the Ganj-i-Sawai and its escort, Fateh Muhammed. Joining forces with several pirate vessels, Every found himself in command of a large squadron, and they were able to loot up to £600,000 in precious metals and jewels, equivalent to around £108 million in 2025.

Every's actions caused considerable damage to England's fragile relations with the Mughals, and a combined bounty of £1,000—an immense sum at the time—was offered by the Privy Council and the East India Company for his capture, leading to the first global manhunt in recorded history. (Note: Between 1689 and 1740 the average wages for an honest merchant seaman was 25 to 55 shillings per month, or about £15 to £33 per year. Many ordinary sailors earned even less than that, with monthly pay of less than £2. A sum of £1,000 equaled a lifetime of work or more, meaning that a prudent sailor could retire for life.) Every was never caught, nor was his treasure recovered, and their fate remains unknown.

In August 1695, Every, captaining the 46-gun frigate Fancy, reached the Mandab Strait, where he teamed up with five other pirate ships, including Thomas Tew's 8-gun, 46-man sloop-of-war Amity, Richard Want in a Brigantine named Dolphin, Joseph Faro in Portsmouth Adventure, Thomas Wake in Susannah, and William Maze in Pearl. Although a Mughal convoy of 25 ships bound for India had eluded the pirate fleet during the night, the following day they encountered Ganj-i-Sawai and her escort Fateh Muhammed, which carried 94 guns herself and was even larger in size than the Ganj-i-Sawai but didn’t have as many crewmen, with both stragglers passing the straits en route to Surat.

== Background ==
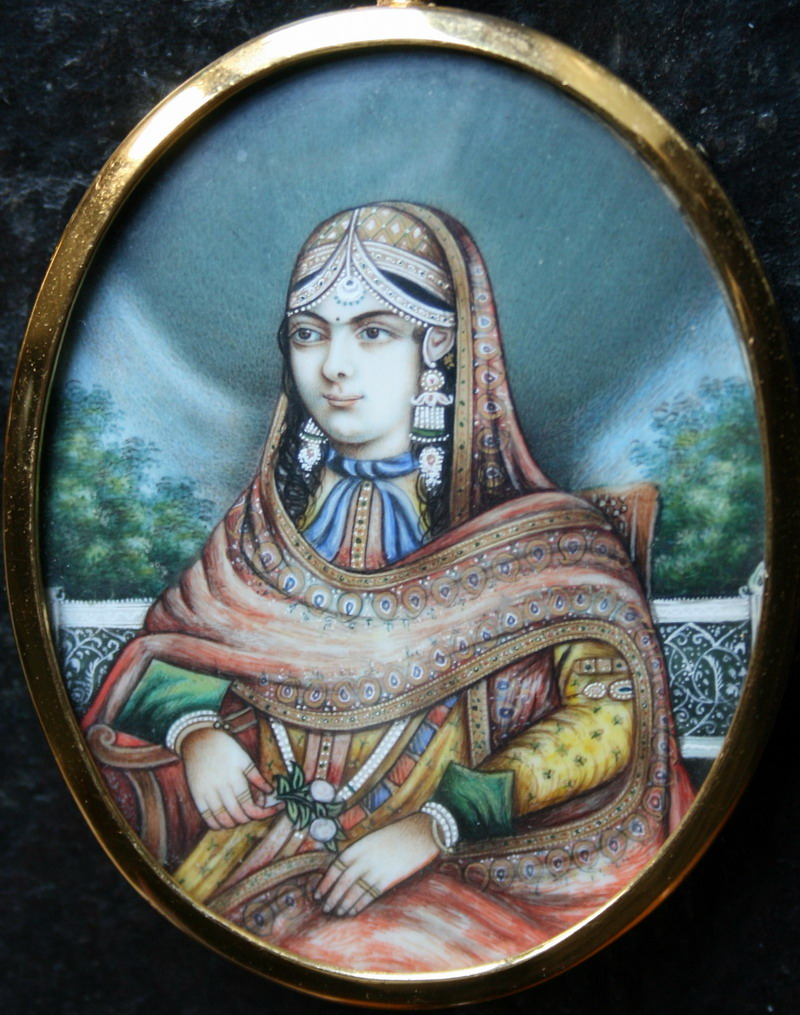
Mariam-uz-Zamani ordered the building of the Ganj-i-Sawai in 1614

=== Ganj-i-Sawai ===
After the loss of the ship Rahimi, the Dowager Empress Mariam-uz-Zamani ordered the building of an even larger ship with 62 guns and the placement of over 400 musketeers. It was named Ganj-I-Sawai and in its day was the most fearsome ship on the seas. It was built with the objective of trade and taking pilgrims to Mecca and on the way back converting all the goods into gold, and silver, and bringing back the pilgrims.

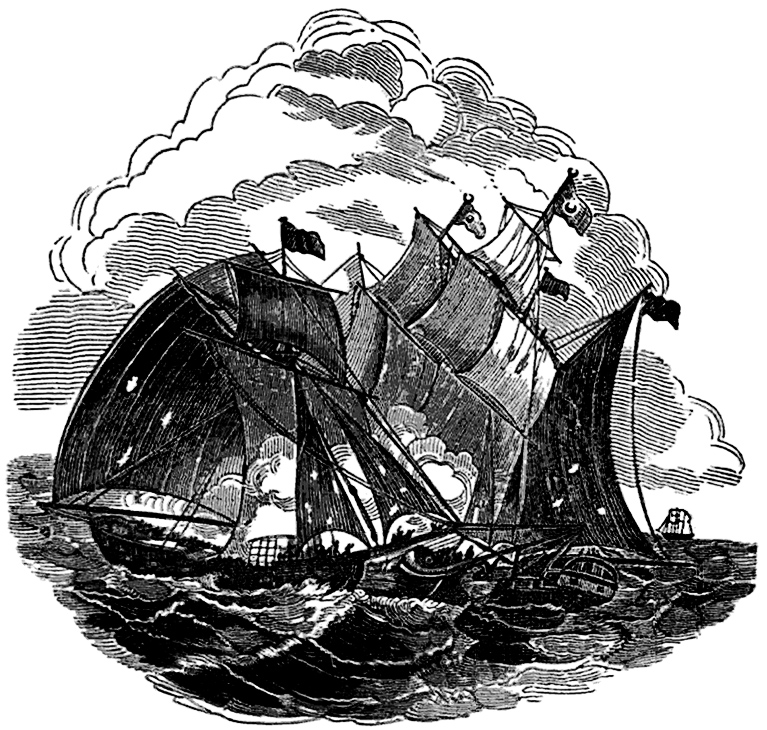
A woodcut from The Pirates Own Book showing the Fancy engaging the Ganj-i-Sawai.

The value of Ganj-i-Sawai's cargo is not known with certainty. Contemporary estimates differed by as much as £300,000, with £325,000 and £600,000 being the traditionally cited numbers. The latter estimate was the value provided by the Mughal authorities, while the EIC estimated the loss at approximately £325,000, nevertheless filing a £600,000 insurance claim.

It has been suggested that the EIC argued for the lowest estimate when paying reparations for Every's raid, with the company's president naturally wanting the most conservative estimate in order to pay as little for the damages as possible. Others contend that the Mughal authorities' figure of £600,000 was a deliberate overestimate aimed at improving their compensation from the English. While some historians have argued that £325,000 was probably closer to the true value, partly because this agreed with the estimate provided by contemporary Scottish merchant Alexander Hamilton, then stationed in Surat, and partly for the above reasons, others have criticized this position as being largely unsubstantiated.

Historian Jan Rogoziński has called Cabo "the richest plunder ever captured by any pirate," estimating its reported treasure of £875,000 to be worth "more than $400 million." In comparison, the EIC's estimate of £325,000 for Ganj-i-Sawai's goods equals "at least $200 million." If the larger estimate of £600,000 is taken, this would be equivalent to $400 million, approximately rivaling the raid committed by Taylor and Levasseur. In any case, if one accepts the EIC's estimate of £325,000, Rogoziński writes that even then "only two or three times in history did criminals take more valuable loot."

=== Other ships ===
Fateh Muhammed's cargo was valued to £50,000–60,000 according to the estimate provided by Dann at his trial; this amount is worth some $30 million in modern currency. Every is known to have captured at least eleven vessels by September 1695, including Ganj-i-Sawai. Aside from Emperor Aurangzeb's fleet, one of the more fruitful prizes was Rampura, a Cambay trading ship that produced the "surprising haul of 1,700,000 rupees."

== Capture ==
In 1695, Every set sail for the volcanic island of Perim to wait for an Indian fleet that would be passing soon. (Note: The fleet made annual pilgrimages to Mecca, so the knowledge of the approximate time the pilgrims would be returning home may have been readily available.) The fleet was easily the richest prize in Asia—perhaps in the entire world—and any pirates who managed to capture it would have been the perpetrators of the world's most profitable pirate raid. In August 1695, Fancy reached the Straits of Bab-el-Mandeb, where Every joined forces with five other pirate captains: Tew on the sloop-of-war Amity, with a crew of about sixty men; Joseph Faro on Portsmouth Adventure, with sixty men; Richard Want on Dolphin, also with sixty men; William Mayes on Pearl, with thirty or forty men; and Thomas Wake on Susanna, with seventy men. All of these captains were carrying privateering commissions that implicated almost the entire Eastern Seaboard of North America. Every was elected admiral of the new six-ship pirate flotilla despite the fact that Tew had arguably more experience, and now found himself in command of over 440 men while they lay in wait for the Indian fleet. A convoy of twenty-five Imperial Mughal ships, including the enormous 1,600-ton Ganj-i-Sawai with eighty cannons and 1,100 crew, and its even larger escort, the 3,200-ton Fateh Muhammed with ninety four cannons and 800 crew, were spotted passing the straits en route to Surat. Although the convoy had managed to elude the pirate fleet during the night, the pirates gave chase.

Dolphin proved to be far too slow, lagging behind the rest of the pirate ships, so it was burned and the crew joined Every aboard Fancy. Amity and Susanna also proved to be poor ships: Amity fell behind and never again rejoined the pirate flotilla (Tew having been killed in a battle with a Mughal ship), while the straggling Susanna eventually rejoined the group. The pirates caught up with Fateh Muhammed four or five days later. Perhaps intimidated by Fancy's forty-six guns or weakened by an earlier battle with Tew, Fateh Muhammed's crew put up little resistance; Every's pirates then sacked the ship, which had belonged to one Abdul Ghaffar, reportedly Surat's wealthiest merchant. (Note: Ghaffar was so powerful and wealthy, one associate described him as follows: "Abdul Ghafur, a Mahometan that I was acquainted with, drove a trade equal to the English East-India Company, for I have known him to fit out in a year, above twenty sail of ships, between 300 and 800 tons.") While Fateh Muhammed's treasure of some £50,000 to £60,000 was enough to buy Fancy fifty times over, once the treasure was shared out among the pirate fleet, Every's crew received only small shares.

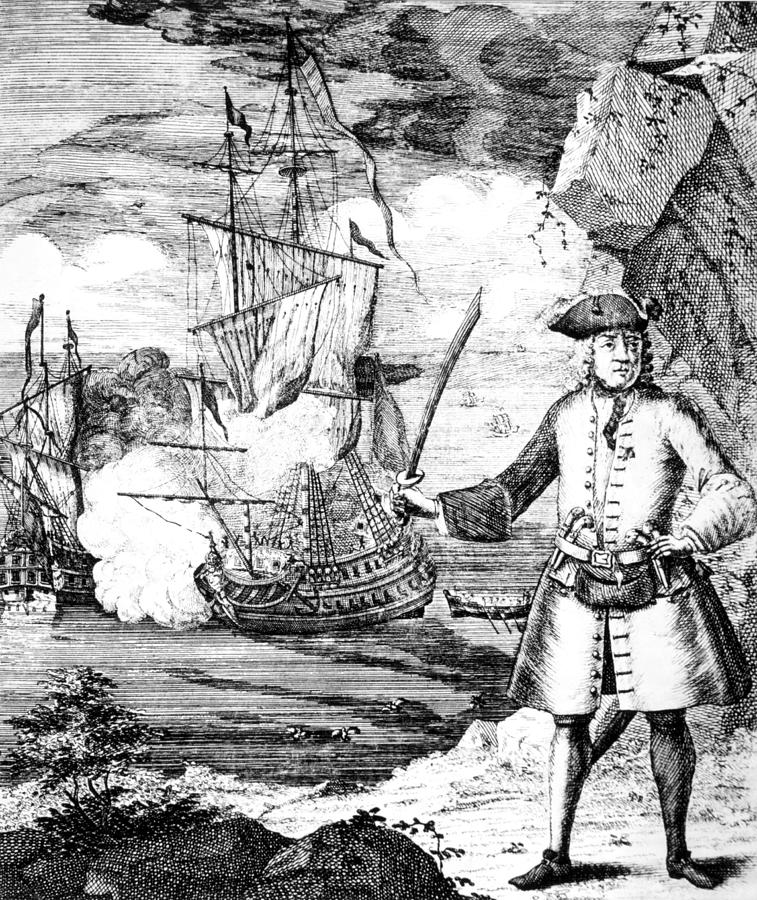
An 18th-century depiction of Henry Every, with the Fancy shown engaging its prey in the background

Every now sailed in pursuit of the second Mughal ship, Ganj-i-Sawai (meaning "Exceeding Treasure," and often Anglicized as Gunsway), overtaking it a few days after the attack on Fateh Muhammed. With Amity and Dolphin left behind, only Fancy, Pearl, and Portsmouth Adventure were present for the actual battle.

Ganj-i-Sawai, captained by Muhammad Ibrahim, was a fearsome opponent, mounting eighty guns and a musket-armed guard of four hundred, as well as six hundred other passengers. But the opening volley evened the odds, as Every's lucky broadside shot his enemy's mainmast by the board. With Ganj-i-sawai unable to escape, Fancy drew alongside. For a moment, a volley of Indian musket fire prevented the pirates from clambering aboard, but one of Ganj-i-Sawai's powerful cannons exploded, instantly killing many and demoralizing the Indian crew, who ran below deck or fought to put out the spreading fires. Every's men took advantage of the confusion, quickly scaling Ganj-i-Sawai's steep sides. The crew of Pearl, initially fearful of attacking Ganj-i-Sawai, now took heart and joined Every's crew on the Indian ship's deck. A ferocious hand-to-hand battle then ensued, lasting two to three hours.

Muhammad Hashim Khafi Khan, a contemporary Indian historian who was in Surat at the time, wrote that, as Every's men boarded the ship, Ganj-i-Sawai's captain ran below decks where he armed the slave girls and sent them up to fight the pirates. Khafi Khan's account of the battle, appearing in his multivolume work The History of India, as Told by Its Own Historians, places blame squarely on Captain Ibrahim for the failure, writing: "The Christians are not bold in the use of the sword, and there were so many weapons on board the imperial vessel that if the captain had made any resistance, they must have been defeated." In any case, after several hours of stubborn but leaderless resistance, the ship surrendered. In his defense, Ibrahim would later report that "many of the enemy were sent to hell." Indeed, Every's outnumbered crew may have suffered anywhere from several to over a hundred casualties, although these figures are uncertain.

According to Khafi Khan, the victorious pirates subjected their captives to an orgy of horror that lasted several days, raping and killing their terrified prisoners deck by deck. The pirates reportedly utilized torture to extract information from their prisoners, who had hidden the treasure in the ship's holds. Some of the Muslim women apparently committed suicide to avoid violation, while those women who did not kill themselves or die from the pirates' brutality were taken aboard Fancy.

Although stories of brutality by the pirates have been dismissed by sympathizers as sensationalism, they are corroborated by the depositions Every's men provided following their capture. John Sparkes testified in his "Last Dying Words and Confession" that the "inhuman treatment and merciless tortures inflicted on the poor Indians and their women still affected his soul", and that, while apparently unremorseful for his acts of piracy, which were of "lesser concern", he was nevertheless repentant for the "horrid barbarities he had committed, though only on the bodies of the heathen." Philip Middleton testified that several of the captive men were murdered, while they also "put several to the torture" and Every's men "lay with the women aboard, and there were several that, from their jewels and habits, seemed to be of better quality than the rest." Furthermore, on 12 October 1695, Sir John Gayer, then-governor of Bombay and president of the EIC, sent a letter to the Lords of Trade, writing:

It is certain the Pyrates, which these People affirm were all English, did do very barbarously by the People of the Ganj-i-sawai and Abdul Gofor's Ship, to make them confess where their Money was, and there happened to be a great Umbraws Wife (as Wee hear) related to the King, returning from her Pilgrimage to Mecha, in her old age. She they abused very much, and forced several other Women, which Caused one person of Quality, his Wife and Nurse, to kill themselves to prevent the Husbands seeing them (and their being) ravished.

== Spoils and treasure ==
Later accounts would tell of how Every himself had found "something more pleasing than jewels" aboard, usually reported to be Mughal Emperor Aurangzeb's daughter or granddaughter. (According to contemporary EIC sources, Ganj-i-Sawai was carrying a "relative" of the Emperor, though there is no evidence to suggest that it was his daughter and her retinue.) However, this is at odds with the deposition of Philip Middleton, who testified that "all of the Charles's men, except Every, boarded [Fateh Muhammed and Ganj-i-sawai] by Turns." At any rate, the survivors were left aboard their emptied ships, which the pirates set free to continue on their voyage back to India. The plunder from Ganj-i-sawai, the greatest ship in the Mughal fleet, totaled somewhere between £200,000 and £600,000, including 500,000 gold and silver pieces. All told, it may have been the richest ship ever taken by pirates.

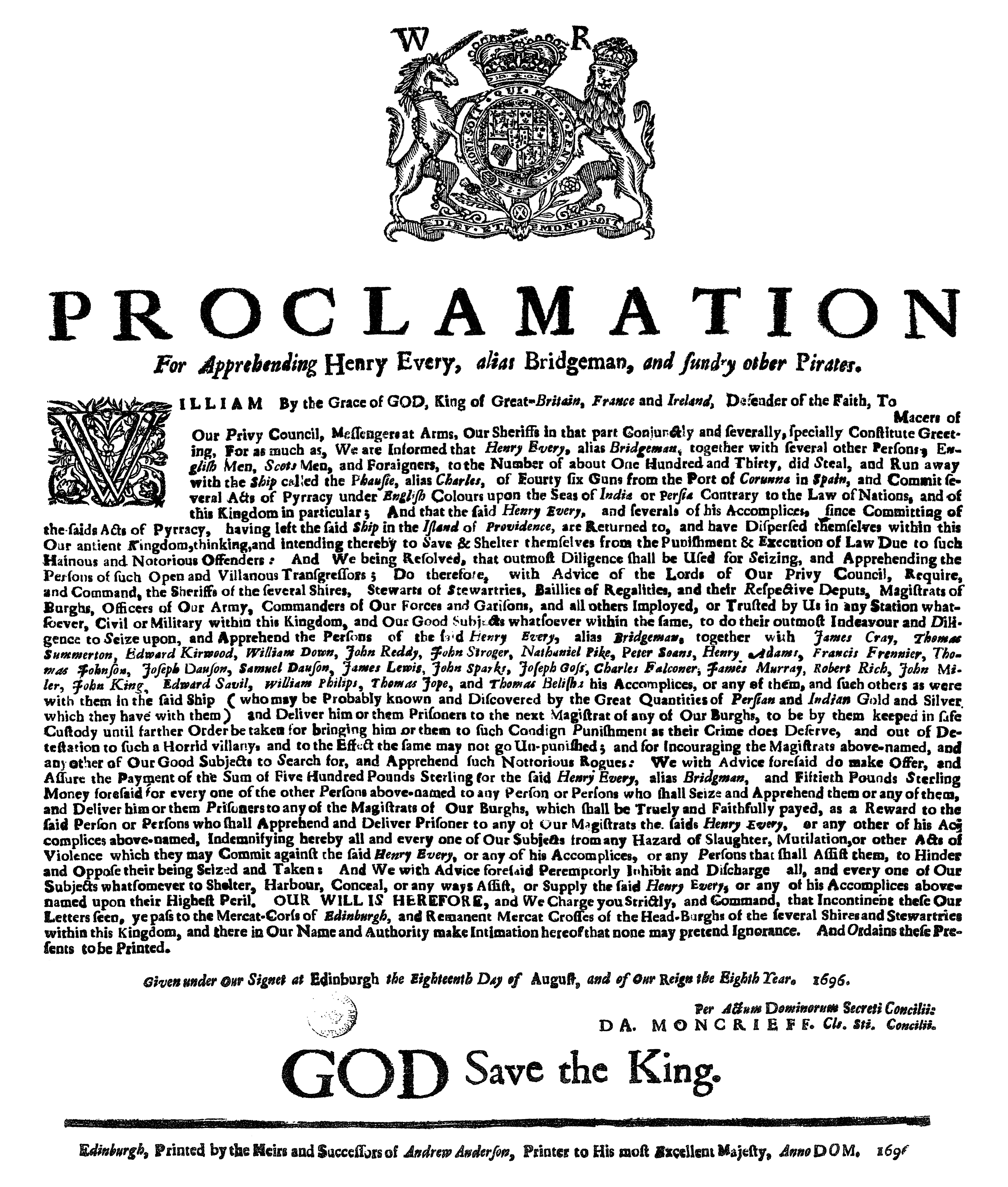
The proclamation for the apprehension of Henry Every, with a reward of £500 sterling (approximately £92294.70 sterling as of November 2023, adjusted for inflation) that was issued by the Privy Council of Scotland on 18 August 1696

=== Sharing of spoils ===
Every's pirates divided their treasure. Although it is sometimes reported that Every used his phenomenal skills of persuasion to convince the other captains to leave the Mughal plunder in his care, quickly slipping away into the night with the entire haul, this comes from Charles Johnson's A General History of the Pyrates, an unreliable account. More reliable sources indicate that there was an exchange of clipped coins between the crews of Pearl and Fancy, with Every's outraged men confiscating Pearl's treasure. (Portsmouth Adventure observed but did not participate in the battle with Ganj-i-sawai, so Faro's crew received none of its treasure.) Every's men then gave Mayes 2,000 pieces of eight (presumably an approximate sum as the treasure captured would have been in Indian and Arabian coins of a different denomination) to buy supplies, and soon parted company.

Fancy sailed for the French colony of Isle Bourbon, arriving there in November 1695. Here the crew shared out £1,000 (roughly £93,300 to £128,000 today) (Note: Inflation adjustment of historical pound sterling value is an imprecise task, but in general, sterling values from the 1690s are multiplied by one hundred to convert into modern pound sterling, and then by five to convert into U.S. dollars. Historians have estimated £1,000 in 1695 to equal anywhere from £93,300 to £128,000 today.) per man, more money than most sailors made in their lifetime. On top of this, each man received an additional share of gemstones. As Every had promised, his men now found themselves glutted with "gold enough to dazzle the eyes." However, this enormous victory had essentially made Every and his crew marked men, and there was a great deal of dispute among the crew about the best place to sail. The French and Danish members of Every's crew decided to leave, preferring to stay in Isle Bourbon. The remaining men set course, after some dissension, for Nassau, The Bahamas, with Every purchasing some 90 slaves shortly before sailing. Along the way, the slaves would be used for the ship's most difficult labor and, being "the most consistent item of trade," could later be traded for whatever the pirates wanted. In this way, Every's men avoided using their foreign currency, which might reveal their identities.

Sailing from the Indian Ocean to the Bahamas was a journey halfway around the world, and Fancy was forced to stop along the way at Ascension Island, located in the middle of the Atlantic. The barren island was uninhabited, but the men were able to catch fifty sea turtles that crawled ashore to lay their eggs on the beach, providing them enough food for the rest of the voyage. However, about 17 members of Every's crew refused to go any further and were left behind on the island.

== Aftermath ==
The plunder of Aurangzeb's treasure ship had serious consequences for the English, coming at a time of crisis for the East India Company (EIC), whose profits were still recovering from the disastrous Anglo-Mughal War. The EIC had seen its total annual imports drop from a peak of £800,000 in 1684 to just £30,000 in 1695, and Every's attack now threatened the very existence of English trade in India. When the damaged Ganj-i-Sawai finally limped its way back to harbor in Surat, news of the pirates' attack on the pilgrims—a sacrilegious act like the violations of the Muslim pilgrims, was considered an unforgivable violation of the Hajj—spread quickly. The governor of Gujarat, Itimad Khan, immediately arrested the English subjects in Surat and kept them under close watch, partly as a punishment for their countrymen's depredations and partly for their own protection from rioting locals. A livid Aurangzeb quickly closed four of the EIC's factories in India and imprisoned its officers, nearly ordering an armed attack against the city of Bombay with the goal of expelling the English from the Indian subcontinent.

To appease Aurangzeb, the EIC promised to pay all financial reparations, while the Parliament of England declared the pirates hostis humani generis ("the enemy of humanity"). In mid-1696, the English government issued a £500 bounty (approximately £92294.70 sterling as of November 2023, adjusted for inflation) on Every's head and offered a free pardon to any informer who disclosed his whereabouts. The EIC later doubled that reward (to £1000), initiating the first global manhunt in recorded history. English authorities also proclaimed that they would exempt Every from all of the Acts of Grace (pardons) and amnesties it would subsequently issue to other pirates (for instance in 1698). As it was by now known that Every was sheltering somewhere in England's North American colonies, where he would likely find safety among corrupt colonial governors, he was out of the jurisdiction of the EIC. This made him a national problem. Accordingly, the Board of Trade was tasked with coordinating the manhunt for Every and his crew.

== Escape ==
=== Hypothesis of escape to New Providence ===
Douglas R. Burgess argues in his 2009 book The Pirates' Pact: The Secret Alliances Between History's Most Notorious Buccaneers and Colonial America that Fancy had reached St. Thomas, where the pirates sold some of their treasure. In March 1696, Fancy anchored at Royal Island off Eleuthera, some 50 miles (80 km) northeast of New Providence in the Bahamas. Four of Every's men took a small boat to Nassau, the island's largest city and capital, with a letter addressed to the island's governor, Nicholas Trott. The letter explained that Fancy had just returned from the coast of Africa, and the ship's crew of 113 self-identified interlopers (unlicensed English traders east of the Cape of Good Hope) now needed some shore time. In return for letting Fancy enter the harbor and for keeping the men's violation of the EIC's trading monopoly a secret, the crew would bribe Trott a combined total of £860. Their captain, a man named "Henry Bridgeman," also promised the ship to the governor as a gift once his crew unloaded the cargo.

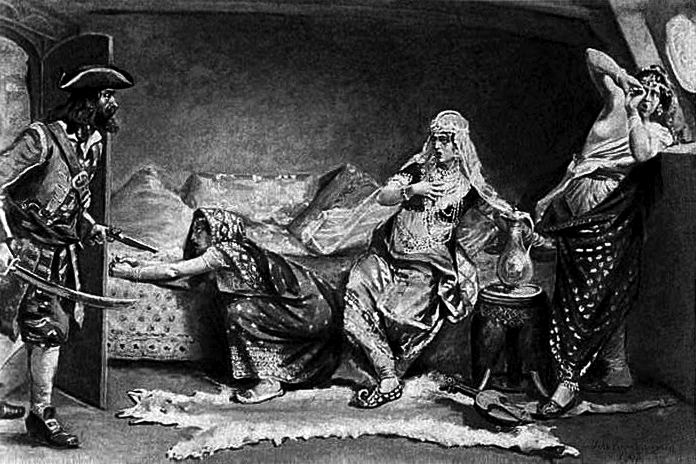
An early 20th-century painting depicting Captain Every's encounter with Emperor Aurangzeb's granddaughter and her retinue

For Trott, this proved a tempting offer. The Nine Years' War had been raging for eight years, and the island, which the Royal Navy had not visited in several years, was perilously underpopulated. Trott knew that the French had recently captured Exuma, 140 miles (230 km) to the southeast, and were now headed for New Providence. With only sixty or seventy men living in the town, half of whom served guard duty at any one time, there was no practical way to keep Nassau's twenty-eight cannons fully manned. However, if Fancy's crew stayed in Nassau it would more than double the island's male population, while the very presence of the heavily armed ship in the harbor might deter a French attack. On the other hand, turning away "Bridgeman" might spell disaster if his intentions turned violent, as his crew of 113 (plus 90 slaves) would easily defeat the island's inhabitants. Lastly, there was also the bribe to consider, which was three times Trott's annual salary of £300.

Trott called a meeting of Nassau's governing council, likely arguing that interloping was a fairly common crime and not a sufficient reason for turning away the men, whose presence now aided Nassau's security. The council agreed to allow Fancy to enter the harbor, apparently having never been told of the private bribe. Trott sent a letter to Every instructing him that his crew "were welcome to come and to go as they pleased." Soon after, Trott met Every personally on land in what must have been a closed-door meeting. Fancy was then handed over to the governor, who found that extra bribes—fifty tons of ivory tusks, one hundred barrels of gunpowder, several chests of firearms and ammunition, and an assortment of ship anchors—had been left in the hold for him.

The wealth of foreign-minted coins could not have escaped Trott. He must have known that the ship's crew were not merely unlicensed slavers, likely noting the patched-up battle damage on Fancy. When word eventually reached that the Royal Navy and EIC were hunting for Fancy and that "Captain Bridgeman" was Every himself, Trott denied ever knowing anything about the pirates' history other than what they told him, adamant that the island's population "saw no reason to disbelieve them." This he argued despite the fact that the proclamation for the pirates' capture specifically warned that Every's crew could "probably be known and discovered by the great quantities of gold and silver of foreign coins which they have with them." In the meantime, however, Every's men were free to frequent the town's pubs. Nevertheless, the crew soon found themselves disappointed with the Bahamas; the islands were sparsely populated, meaning that there was virtually no place to spend the money they had pirated. For the next several months the pirates spent most of their time living in relative boredom. By now Trott had stripped Fancy of everything valuable, and it was lost after being violently driven against some rocks, perhaps deliberately on the orders of Trott, who was eager to rid himself of a key piece of evidence.

=== Disappearance ===
Burgess argues that when the proclamation for the apprehension of Every and his crew reached Trott, he was forced to either put a warrant out for Every's arrest or, failing to do so, effectively disclose his association with the pirate. Preferring the former choice for the sake of his reputation, he alerted the authorities as to the pirates' whereabouts, but was able to tip off Every and his crew before the authorities arrived. Every's 113-person crew then fashioned their hasty escape, vanishing from the island with only twenty-four men ever captured, five of whom were executed. Every himself was never seen again. His last words to his men were a litany of conflicting stories of where he planned to go, likely intended to throw pursuers off his trail.

It has been suggested that because Every was unable to buy a pardon from Trott or from the governor of Jamaica, his crew split up, some remaining in the West Indies, the majority heading to North America, and the rest, including Every himself, returning to England. Of these, some sailed aboard the sloop Isaac, while Every and about twenty other men sailed in the sloop Sea Flower (captained by Faro) to Ireland towards the end of June 1696. They aroused suspicions while unloading their treasure, and two of the men were subsequently caught. Every, however, was able to escape once again.

== See also ==
- Polacca
- Sloop

== Bibliography ==
- Baer, Joel (2005). Pirates of the British Isles. Tempus. ISBN 9780752423043.
- Botting, Douglas (1978). The Seafarers: The Pirates. Time-Life Books. pp. 82–83.
- Burgess, Douglas R. (2009a). The Pirates' Pact: The Secret Alliances Between History's Most Notorious Buccaneers and Colonial America. New York: McGraw-Hill. ISBN 978-0-07-147476-4.
- Burgess, Douglas R. (2009b). "Piracy in the Public Sphere: The Henry Every Trials and the Battle for Meaning in Seventeenth-Century Print Culture". Journal of British Studies. 48 (4). The University of Chicago Press: 887–913. doi:10.1086/603599. S2CID 145637922.
- Davis, Ralph (1962). The Rise of the English Shipping Industry in the Seventeenth and Eighteenth Centuries. London: Macmillan Publishers. ISBN 978-0-905555-20-1.
- Earle, Peter (2006). The Pirate Wars. New York: St. Martin's Griffin. ISBN 978-0-312-33580-9.
- Elliot, Henry Miers; Dowson, John, eds. (1877). The History of India, as Told by Its Own Historians: The Muhammadan Period. Vol. 7. London: Trübner & Co.
- Fox, E. T. (2008). King of the Pirates: The Swashbuckling Life of Henry Every. London: Tempus Publishing. ISBN 978-0-7524-4718-6.
- Grey, Charles (1933). Pirates of the Eastern Seas (1618–1723): A Lurid Page of History. London: Sampson Low, Marston & Co. OCLC 499970.
- Jameson, John Franklin (1923). "Case of Henry Every". Privateering and Piracy in the Colonial Period: Illustrative Documents. New York: Macmillan Publishers. pp. 153–188.
- Keay, John (1991). The Honourable Company: A History of the English East India Company. London: HarperCollins. ISBN 978-0-00-217515-9.
- Konstam, Angus (2008). Piracy: The Complete History. Oxford: Osprey Publishing. ISBN 978-1-84603-240-0.
- Rogoziński, Jan (2000). Honor Among Thieves: Captain Kidd, Henry Every, and the Pirate Democracy in the Indian Ocean. Mechanicsburg, PA: Stackpole Books. ISBN 978-0-8117-1529-4.
- Saletore, Rajaram Narayan (1978). Indian Pirates. Concept Publishing Company.
- Travers, Tim (2007). Pirates: A History. London: Tempus Publishing. ISBN 978-0-7524-3936-5.
- Woodard, Colin (2007). The Republic of Pirates: Being the True and Surprising Story of the Caribbean Pirates and the Man Who Brought Them Down. Orlando, FL: Houghton Mifflin Harcourt. pp. 20–23. ISBN 978-0-15-101302-9.
- Wright, Arnold (1918). Annesley of Surat and His Times, the True Story of the Mythical Wesley Fortune. London: Andrew Melrose.
