= Henry Every =

English captain and pirate (late 1600s)

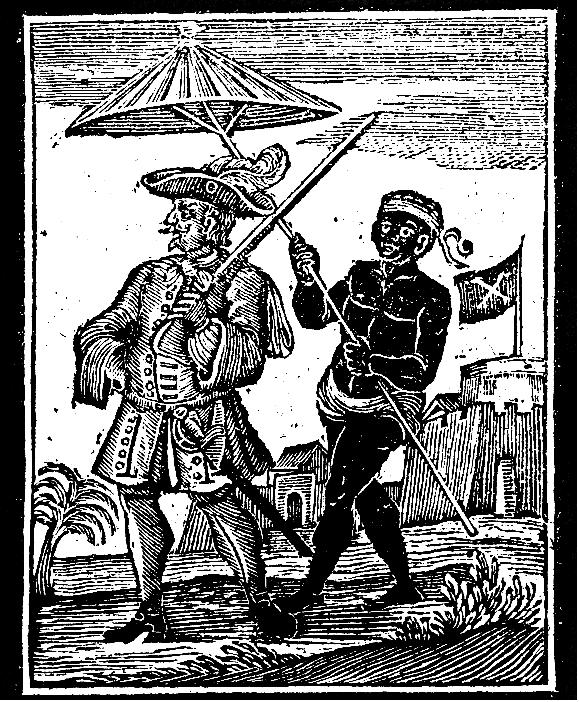
- A woodcut from A General History of the Pyrates (1725)
- Born: 20 August 1659; Newton Ferrers, Devon, England
- Disappeared: June 1696 (aged 36)
- Spouse: Dorothy Arther
- Piratical career
- Nickname: Long Ben; The Arch Pirate; The King of Pirates
- Allegiance: None
- Years active: 1694 – 1696
- Rank: Captain
- Base of operations: Atlantic Ocean, along the Pirate Round, and the Indian Ocean
- Commands: Fancy, formerly Charles II
- Wealth: At least 11 vessels captured by September 1695, including the Ganj-i-Sawai

Henry Every, also known as Henry Avery (born 20 August 1659; disappeared June 1696), sometimes erroneously given as Jack Avery or John Avery, (Note: All surviving government documents from Every's time give his name as "Henry Every" (occasionally spelt "Avery" and "Evarie" in contemporary records), and "Henry Every" is how the pirate signed his name. The name "John Avery" appears in the 1709 pamphlet The Life and Adventures of Capt. John Avery, but the memoir is a work of fiction. Daniel Defoe later borrowed this name for his 1720 book The King of Pirates, and the usage of "John Avery" continued afterwards, most notably by the Dictionary of National Biography. (The Oxford Dictionary of National Biography, published in September 2004, uses "Henry Avery.") Although it is possible that "John Avery" was one of the pirate's aliases, there are no known records of him ever using this name.) was an English pirate who operated in the Atlantic and Indian oceans in the mid-1690s. He probably used several aliases throughout his career, including Benjamin Bridgeman, and was known as Long Ben to his crewmen and associates. (Note: The meaning of the nickname "Long Ben," which appears in usage as early as 1693, is unclear. Some have speculated that it referred to Every's height, the pirate having once been described as "a tall, strongly built man".)

Dubbed the Arch Pirate and the King of Pirates by contemporaries, Every was infamous for being one of the very few major pirate captains to escape with his loot without being arrested or killed in battle, and for being the perpetrator of what has been called the most profitable act of piracy in history. Although Every's career as a pirate lasted only two years, his exploits captured the public's imagination, inspired others to take up piracy, and spawned works of literature. He began his pirate career while he was first mate aboard the warship Charles II. As the ship lay anchored in the northern Spanish harbour of Corunna, the crew grew discontented as Spain failed to deliver a letter of marque and Charles II's owners failed to pay their wages, so they mutinied. Charles II was renamed the Fancy and the crew elected Every its captain.

Every's most famous raid was on a 25-ship convoy of Grand Mughal vessels making the annual pilgrimage to Mecca, including the treasure-laden Ghanjah dhow Ganj-i-Sawai and its escort, Fateh Muhammed. On 7 September 1695, joining forces with several pirate vessels, Every commanded the small pirate squadron. They captured up to £600,000 in precious metals and jewels (equivalent to around £107.6 million in 2025). This caused considerable damage to England's fragile relations with the Mughals. A combined bounty of £1,000—an immense sum at the time—was offered by the Privy Council and the East India Company for his capture. This is considered the first worldwide manhunt in recorded history. (Note: Between 1689 and 1740 the average wages for an honest merchant seaman was 25 to 55 shillings per month, or about £15 to £33 per year. Many ordinary sailors earned even less than that, with a monthly pay of less than £2. A sum of £1,000 equalled a lifetime of work or more, meaning that a prudent sailor could retire for life.)

Although a number of his crew were subsequently arrested, Every himself eluded capture, vanishing from all records in 1696; his whereabouts and activities after this period are unknown. Unconfirmed accounts state he may have changed his name and retired, quietly living out the rest of his life in either Britain or on an unidentified tropical island, while alternative accounts consider Every may have squandered his riches. He is considered (Note: There is no reliable evidence for Every's death date.) to have died sometime between 1699 and 1714; his treasure has never been recovered.

== Early life ==
=== Background ===
Modern scholarship suggests Henry Every was born on 20 August 1659 in the village of Newton Ferrers, about 9.7 kilometres (6 mi) southeast of Plymouth, Devon, England. Parish records suggest that he was the son of John Evarie and his wife, Anne, maiden name unknown. The Every family of Devon was quite established at the time, and it is likely he was a kinsman of the Everys of Wycroft Castle. According to the deposition of William Phillips, a member of Every's crew who gave a "voluntary confession" after his capture, in August 1696 Every was "aged about 40 years," his mother lived "near Plymouth," and his wife was a periwig seller who lived "in Ratcliffe Highway." He wed Dorothy Arther at St James Duke's Place in London on 11 September 1690. There is no evidence that he had any children.

The earliest biographical account of the man, The Life and Adventures of Capt. John Avery (London: J. Baker, 1709), states that he was born in 1653 in Cattedown, Plymouth. Although this location and date are now known to be incorrect, they have been frequently cited in earlier literature. Another suggested year for Every's birth is 1665, though this too is in error. The memoir's Dutch author, who wrote his account a little over a decade after the pirate had vanished, uses the name Adrian van Broeck, but this is probably a pseudonym. The account tells of Van Broeck's short captivity by Every's crew aboard Fancy, and claims that Every's father was a trading captain who had served in the Royal Navy under Admiral Robert Blake. Several later accounts of Every's life, most prominently Daniel Defoe's The King of Pirates (1720), have made reference to the earlier work, but it is of questionable veracity and has been described by the Dictionary of National Biography as "fiction, with scarcely a substratum of fact".

Although a theory existed that Every's birth name was actually Benjamin Bridgeman, especially in light of his nickname "Long Ben", and that "Henry Every" was in fact an alias, modern scholarship has debunked it. It is accepted by historians that "Henry Every" was the pirate's real name, given that he used this name when he entered the Royal Navy. As this was prior to the onset of his piratical career, he would have had no need for an alias. He used the name "Bridgeman" only after committing piracy. Every may have been a cousin of the well-known Every baronets, though this has not been proven conclusively.

=== Royal Navy service ===
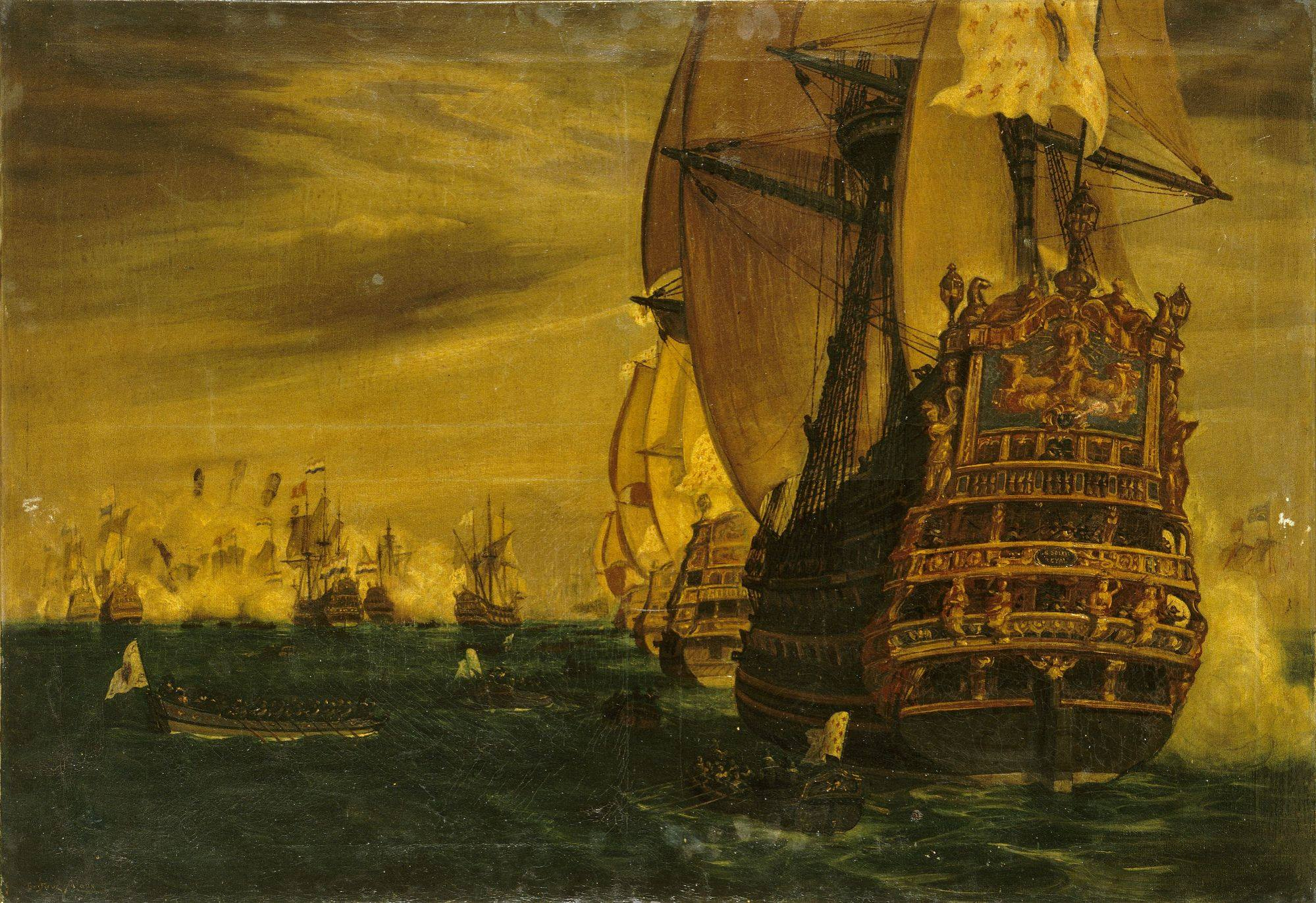
1928 painting of the Battle of Beachy Head

Every was probably a sailor from his youth, serving on various Royal Navy ships. Popular accounts state that Every served aboard the English fleet bombarding Algiers in 1671, buccaneered in the Caribbean Sea, and even captained a logwood freighter in the Bay of Campeche, although these stories come from Van Broeck's fictional memoir. The substantiated record picks up in March 1689, shortly after the breakout of the Nine Years' War.

During the conflict, England and its allies—the Grand Alliance—Bavaria, the Dutch Republic, the Palatinate, Saxony, and Spain—were waging war against Louis XIV of France in an attempt to contain French expansion, and it was against this background that Every, now in his early thirties, was working as a midshipman aboard the sixty-four gun ship of the line HMS Rupert, then under the command of Sir Francis Wheeler. Every's naval records suggest he was something of a family man, who spent "little of his wages on extras such as tobacco and regularly consigned his pay to his family".

In mid-1689, HMS Rupert helped capture a large French convoy off Brest, France. This victory gave Every an opportunity to better his fortunes and by the end of July he was promoted to Master's mate, although he was probably the most junior of HMS Rupert's three Master's mates. In late June 1690, he was invited to join Captain Wheeler on a new ship, the ninety-gun HMS Albemarle. He likely participated in the Battle of Beachy Head against the French two weeks later, an engagement which ended disastrously for the English. On 29 August of that year, Every was discharged from the Royal Navy.

=== Every and the slave trade ===
After his discharge from the navy in 1691, Every became involved in the Atlantic slave trade. He was contract by the governor of Bermuda, Isaac Richier, to transport African slaves from West Africa to the Americas; during this period, Every operated primarily as a slave trader along the Guinea coast. According to English historian Douglas Botting, "[as] a slaver Avery seems to have been more devious than most other practitioners of that sordid craft."

In 1693, Every's activities along the Guinea coast had led other slave traders to take notice of him. Captain Thomas Phillips, a Welsh slave trader and captain of the Hannibal, a slave ship in the employ of the Royal African Company (RAC), wrote in his journal that "I have no where upon the coast met the negroes so shy as here, which makes me fancy they have had tricks play'd them by such blades as Long Ben, alias Avery, who have seiz'd them and carry'd them away." Every was also known to lure slave traders onto his ship by flying friendly colours, then seizing and chaining them in his ship's hold alongside their captives. Phillips, who according to his own writings had come across Every on more than one occasion—and may have even known him personally—also took note of Every's unusual slave trading commission from Richier, an unpopular royal governor who was later removed from his post in 1693 for misbehaviour. However, historians have noted that this part of Every's life is relatively undocumented.

== Piratical career ==
=== Spanish Expedition Shipping ===
In the spring of 1693, several London-based investors led by Sir James Houblon, a wealthy merchant hoping to reinvigorate the stagnating English economy, assembled an ambitious venture known as the Spanish Expedition Shipping. The venture consisted of four warships: the pink Seventh Son, as well as the frigates Dove (of which famed navigator William Dampier was second mate), James, and Charles II (sometimes erroneously given as Duke). (Note: The name "Duke" appears in Charles Johnson's A General History of the Pyrates and was borrowed in several later publications. However, according to governmental records as well as depositions given by captured members of Every's crew, the ship's name was Charles II. It is likely Johnson confused Charles II with the Bristol privateer captained by Woodes Rogers.)

Charles II had been commissioned by England's ally, Charles II of Spain, the ship's namesake, to prey on French vessels in the West Indies. Under a trading and salvage license from the Spanish, the venture's mission was to sail to the Spanish West Indies, where the convoy would conduct trade, supply the Spanish with arms, and recover treasure from wrecked galleons while plundering the French possessions in the area. The investors promised to pay the sailors well: the contract stipulated a guaranteed monthly wage to be paid every six months throughout the deployment, with the first month's pay paid in advance before the start of the mission. Houblon personally went aboard the ships and met the crew, reassuring them of their pay. All wages up to 1 August 1693, not long before the start of the mission, were paid on that date.

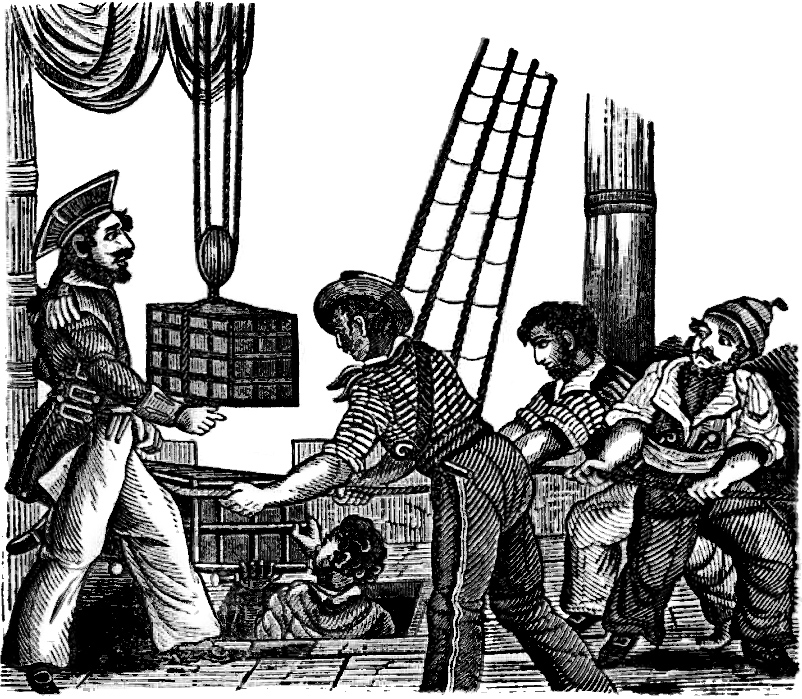
An 1837 woodcut from The Pirates Own Book by Charles Ellms depicting Henry Every receiving three chests of treasure on board his ship, the Fancy.

As a result of his previous experience in the navy, Every was promoted to first mate after joining the Spanish Expedition. The convoy's four ships were commanded by Admiral Sir Don Arturo O'Byrne, an Irish nobleman who had previously served in the Spanish Navy Marines. The voyage was soon in trouble, as the flag captain, John Strong, a career mariner who had previously served with Sir William Phips, died while the ship was still in port. Although he was replaced by Captain Charles Gibson, this would not be the last of the venture's misfortunes.

In early August 1693, the four warships were sailing down the River Thames en route to Spain's northern city of Corunna. The journey to Corunna should have taken two weeks, but for some reason, the ships did not arrive in Spain until five months later. The necessary legal documents had apparently failed to arrive from Madrid, so the ships were forced to wait. As months passed and the documents still did not arrive, the sailors found themselves in an unenviable position: with no money to send home to support their families and unable to find alternative sources of employment, they had become virtual prisoners in Corunna.

After a few months in port, the men petitioned their captain for the pay they should have received since their employment began. If this request had been granted, the men would no longer have been tied to the ship and could easily have left, so predictably their petition was denied. After a similar petition to Houblon by the men's wives had failed, many of the sailors became desperate, believing that they had been sold into slavery to the Spanish.

On 1 May, as the fleet was preparing to leave Corunna, the men demanded their six months of pay or threatened to strike. Houblon refused to acquiesce to these demands, but Admiral O'Byrne, seeing the seriousness of the situation, wrote to England asking for the money owed to his men. On 6 May, some of the sailors were involved in an argument with O'Byrne, and it was probably around this time that they conceived of a plan to mutiny and began recruiting others.

One of the men recruiting others was Every. As William Phillips, a mariner on Dove, would later testify, Every went "up & down from Ship to Ship & persuaded the men to come on board him, & he would carry them where they should get money enough." Since Every had a great deal of experience and was also born in a lower social rank, he was the natural choice to command the mutiny, as the crew believed he would have their best interests at heart.

=== Mutiny and ascension to captaincy ===
On Monday, 7 May 1694, O'Byrne was scheduled to sleep ashore, which gave the men the opportunity they were looking for. At approximately 9:00 p.m., Every and about twenty-five other men rushed aboard Charles II and surprised the crew on board. Captain Gibson was bedridden at the time, so the mutiny ended bloodlessly. (Note: A common account states that Captain Gibson was a notorious drunkard and was intoxicated at the time of the mutiny; however, depositions provided by Every's crew make it clear that Captain Gibson was gravely ill and not drunk.) One account states that the extra men from James pulled up in a longboat beside the ship and gave the password, saying, "Is the drunken boatswain on board?" before joining in the mutiny. Captain Humphreys of James is said to have called out to Every that the men were deserting, to which Every calmly replied that he knew perfectly well. James then fired on Charles II, alerting the Spanish Night Watch, and Every was forced to make a run to the open sea, quickly vanishing into the night.

Declaration of Henry Every to English ship commanders

To all English Commanders lett this Satisfye that I was Riding here att this Instant in ye Ship fancy man of Warr formerly the Charles of ye Spanish Expedition who departed from Croniae [Corunna] ye 7th of May. 94: Being and am now in A Ship of 46 guns 150 Men & bound to Seek our fortunes I have Never as Yett Wronged any English or Dutch nor never Intend while I am Commander. Wherefore as I Commonly Speake wth all Ships I Desire who ever Comes to ye perusal of this to take this Signall that if you or aney whome you may informe are desirous to know wt wee are att a Distance then make your Antient [i.e., ensign, flag] Vp in a Ball or Bundle and hoyst him att ye Mizon Peek ye Mizon Being furled I shall answere wth ye same & Never Molest you: for my Men are hungry Stout and Resolute: & should they Exceed my Desire I cannott help my selfe.
as Yett
An Englishman's friend,

At Johanna [Anjouan] February 28th, 1694/5
Henry Every

Here is 160 od french Armed men now att Mohilla who waits for Opportunity of getting aney ship, take Care of your Selves.

After sailing far enough for safety, Every gave the non-conspirators a chance to go ashore, even deferentially offering to let Gibson command the ship if he would join their cause. According to Charles Ellms, Every's words to Gibson were, "if you have a mind to make one of us, we will receive you; and if you turn sober, and attend to business, perhaps in time I may make you up of my lieutenants; if not, here's a boat, and you shall be set on shore." The captain declined and was set ashore with several other sailors.

The only man who was prevented from voluntarily leaving was the ship's surgeon, whose services were deemed too important to forgo. All of the men left on board Charles II unanimously elected Every captain of the ship. Some reports say that Every was much ruder in his dealings with Gibson, but agree that he at least offered him the position of the second mate. In either case, Every exhibited an amount of gentility and generosity in his operation of the mutiny that indicates his motives were not a mere adventure.

Every was easily able to convince the men to sail to the Indian Ocean as pirates since their original mission had greatly resembled piracy and Every was renowned for his powers of persuasion. He may have mentioned Thomas Tew's success in capturing an enormous prize in the Red Sea only a year earlier. The crew quickly settled the subject of payment by deciding that each member would get one share of the treasure, and the captain would get two. Every then renamed Charles II the Fancy—a name which reflected both the crew's renewed hope in their journey and the quality of the ship—and set a course for the Cape of Good Hope.

=== The Pirate Round ===
At Maio, the easternmost of the Cape Verde's Sotavento islands, Every committed his first piracy, robbing three English merchantmen from Barbados of provisions and supplies. Nine of the men from these ships were quickly persuaded to join Every's crew, who now numbered about ninety-four men. Every then sailed to the Guinea coast, where he tricked a local chieftain into boarding Fancy under the false pretence of trade, and forcibly took his and his men's wealth, leaving them slaves. Continuing to hug the African coastline, Every then stopped at Bioko in the Bight of Benin, where Fancy was careened and razeed. Cutting away some of the superstructure to improve the ship's speed made Fancy one of the fastest vessels then sailing in the Atlantic Ocean. In October 1694, Fancy captured two Danish privateers near the island of Príncipe, stripping the ships of ivory and gold and welcoming approximately seventeen defecting Danes aboard.

In early 1695, Fancy finally rounded the Cape of Good Hope, stopping in Madagascar where the crew restocked supplies, likely in the area of St. Augustine's Bay. (Note: Suggestions that Every had anchored at Adam Baldridge's post to resupply after rounding the Cape of Good Hope are probably incorrect. Baldridge is known to have kept detailed records of the ships that visited his settlement between 1690 and 1697, and the Fancy is not listed as one of those ships.) The ship next stopped at the island of Johanna in the Comoros Islands. Here Every's crew rested and took on provisions, later capturing a passing French pirate ship, looting the vessel and recruiting some forty of the crew to join their own company. Every's total strength was now about 150 men.

At Johanna, Every wrote a letter addressed to the English ship commanders in the Indian Ocean, falsely stating that he had not attacked any English ships. His letter describes a signal English skippers could use to identify themselves so he could avoid them and warns them that he might not be able to restrain his crew from plundering their ships if they failed to use the signal. It is unclear whether this document was true, but it may have been a ploy by Every to avoid the attention of the East India Company (EIC), whose large and powerful ships were the only threat Fancy faced in the Indian Ocean. Either way, the letter was unsuccessful in preventing the English from pursuing him.

=== The Grand Mughal's fleet ===
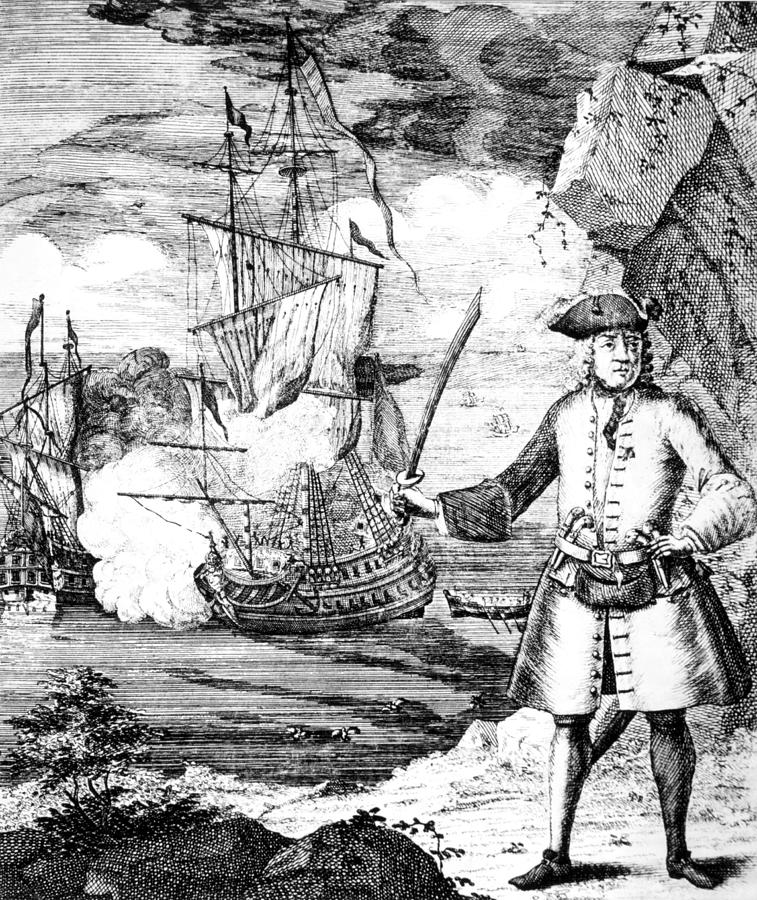
An 18th-century depiction of Henry Every, with the Fancy shown capturing the Grand Mughal Fleet

In 1695, Every set sail for the volcanic island of Perim to wait for an Indian fleet that would be passing soon. (Note: The fleet made annual pilgrimages to Mecca, so the knowledge of the approximate time the pilgrims would be returning home may have been readily available.) The fleet was easily the richest prize in Asia—perhaps in the entire world—and any pirates who managed to capture it would have been the perpetrators of the world's most profitable pirate raid. In August 1695, Fancy reached the Straits of Bab-el-Mandeb, where Every joined forces with five other pirate captains: Tew on the sloop-of-war Amity, with a crew of about sixty men; Joseph Faro on Portsmouth Adventure, with sixty men; Richard Want on Dolphin, also with sixty men; William Mayes on Pearl, with thirty or forty men; and Thomas Wake on Susanna, with seventy men. All of these captains were carrying privateering commissions that implicated almost the entire Eastern Seaboard of North America. Every was elected admiral of the new six-ship pirate flotilla despite the fact that Tew had arguably more experience, and now found himself in command of over 440 men while they lay in wait for the Indian fleet. A convoy of twenty-five Grand Mughal ships, including the enormous 1,600-ton Ganj-i-sawai with eighty cannons and 1,100 crew, and its even larger escort, the 3,200-ton Fateh Muhammed with ninety-four cannons and 800 crew, were spotted passing the straits en route to Surat. Although the convoy had managed to elude the pirate fleet during the night, the pirates gave chase. While Fateh Muhammed's treasure of some £50,000 to £60,000 was enough to buy Fancy fifty times over, once the treasure was shared out among the pirate fleet, Every's crew received only small shares.

Ganj-i-sawai, captained by one Muhammad Ibrahim, was a fearsome opponent, mounting eighty guns and a musket-armed guard of four hundred, as well as six hundred other passengers. The crew of Pearl, initially fearful of attacking Ganj-i-sawai, now took heart and joined Every's crew on the Indian ship's deck. A ferocious hand-to-hand battle then ensued, lasting two to three hours.

Muhammad Hashim Khafi Khan, a contemporary Indian historian who was in Surat at the time, wrote that, as Every's men boarded the ship, Ganj-i-sawai's captain ran below decks where he armed the slave girls and sent them up to fight the pirates. Khafi Khan's account of the battle, appearing in his multivolume work The History of India, as Told by Its Own Historians, places blame squarely on Captain Ibrahim for the failure, writing: "The Christians are not bold in the use of the sword, and there were so many weapons on board the royal vessel that if the captain had made any resistance, they must have been defeated."

According to Khafi Khan, the victorious pirates subjected their captives to an orgy of horror that lasted several days, raping and killing their terrified prisoners deck by deck. The pirates reportedly utilized torture to extract information from their prisoners, who had hidden the treasure in the ship's holds. Some of the Muslim women apparently committed suicide to avoid a violation, while those women who did not kill themselves or die from the pirates' brutality were taken aboard Fancy.

Later accounts would tell of how Every himself had found "something more pleasing than jewels" aboard, usually reported to be Mughal Emperor Aurangzeb's daughter or granddaughter. (According to contemporary EIC sources, Ganj-i-sawai was carrying a "relative" of the Emperor, though there is no evidence to suggest that it was his daughter and her retinue.) At any rate, the survivors were left aboard their emptied ships, which the pirates set free to continue on their voyage back to India. The loot from Ganj-i-sawai, the greatest ship in the Mughal fleet, totalled somewhere between £200,000 and £600,000, including 500,000 gold and silver pieces. All told, it may have been the richest ship ever taken by pirates (see Career wealth below).

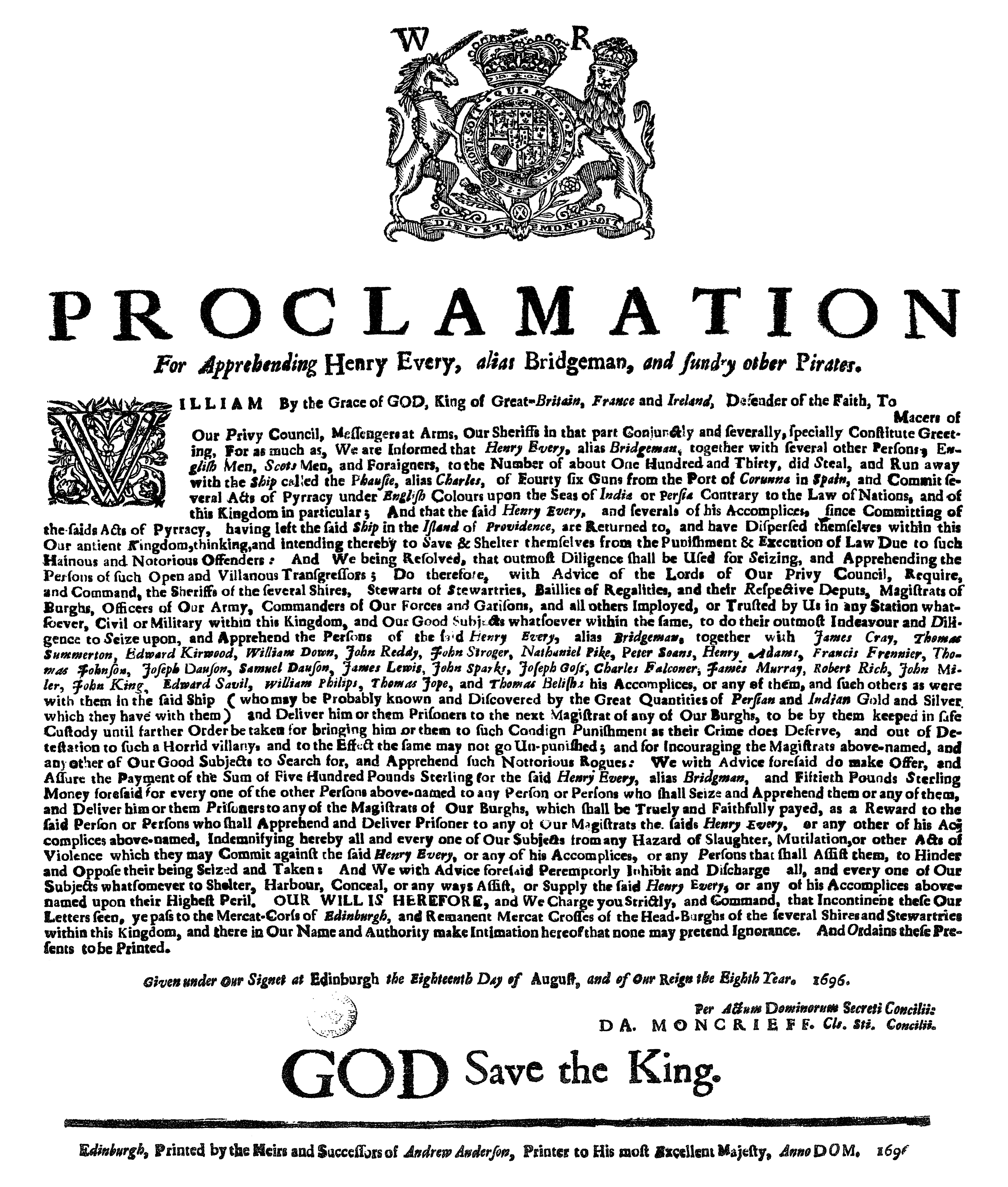
The proclamation for the apprehension of Henry Every, with a reward of £500 sterling (approximately £92300 sterling as of November 2023, adjusted for inflation) that was issued by the Privy Council of Scotland on 18 August 1696

==== Sharing the spoils ====
Every's pirates divided their treasure. Although it is sometimes reported that Every used his phenomenal skills of persuasion to convince the other captains to leave the Mughal loot in his care, quickly slipping away into the night with the entire haul, this comes from Charles Johnson's A General History of the Pyrates, an unreliable account. More reliable sources indicate that there was an exchange of clipped coins between the crews of Pearl and Fancy, with Every's outraged men confiscating Pearl's treasure. (Portsmouth Adventure observed but did not participate in the battle with Ganj-i-sawai, so Faro's crew received none of its treasure.) Every's men then gave Mayes 2,000 pieces of eight (presumably an approximate sum as the treasure captured would have been in Indian and Arabian coins of a different denomination) to buy supplies, and soon parted company.

==== Aftermath and manhunt ====
The plunder of Aurangzeb's treasure ship had serious consequences for the English, coming at a time of crisis for the East India Company (EIC), whose profits were still recovering from the disastrous Anglo-Mughal War. The EIC had seen its total annual imports drop from a peak of £800,000 in 1684 to just £30,000 in 1695, and Every's attack now threatened the very existence of English trade in India. When the damaged Ganj-i-Sawai finally limped its way back to harbor in Surat, news of the pirates' attack on the pilgrims—a sacrilegious act that, like the rape of the Muslim women, was considered an unforgivable violation of the Hajj—spread quickly. The governor of Gujarat, Itimad Khan, immediately arrested the English subjects in Surat and kept them under close watch, partly as a punishment for their countrymen's depredations and partly for their own protection from rioting locals. A livid Aurangzeb quickly closed four of the EIC's factories in India and imprisoned its officers, nearly ordering an armed attack against the city of Bombay with the goal of expelling the English from the Indian subcontinent.

To appease Aurangzeb, the EIC promised to pay all financial reparations, while the Parliament of England declared the pirates hostis humani generis ("the enemy of humanity"). In mid-1696, the English government issued a £500 bounty (approximately £92.300 sterling as of 2023, adjusted for inflation) on Every's head and offered a free pardon to any informer who disclosed his whereabouts. The EIC later doubled that reward (to £1000), initiating the first global manhunt in recorded history. English authorities also proclaimed that they would exempt Every from all of the Acts of Grace (pardons) and amnesties it would subsequently issue to other pirates (for instance in 1698). As it was by now known that Every was sheltering somewhere in England's North American colonies, where he would likely find safety among corrupt colonial governors, he was out of the jurisdiction of the EIC. This made him a national problem. Accordingly, the Board of Trade was tasked with coordinating the manhunt for Every and his crew.

=== Hypothesis of escape to New Providence ===
Douglas R. Burgess argues in his 2009 book The Pirates' Pact: The Secret Alliances Between History's Most Notorious Buccaneers and Colonial America that Fancy had reached St. Thomas, where the pirates sold some of their treasure. In March 1696, Fancy anchored at Royal Island off Eleuthera, some 50 miles (80 km) northeast of New Providence in the Bahamas. Four of Every's men took a small boat to Nassau, the island's largest city and capital, with a letter addressed to the island's governor, Nicholas Trott. The letter explained that Fancy had just returned from the coast of Africa, and the ship's crew of 113 self-identified interlopers (unlicensed English traders east of the Cape of Good Hope) now needed some shore time. In return for letting Fancy enter the harbour and for keeping the men's violation of the EIC's trading monopoly a secret, the crew would pay Trott a combined total of £860. Their captain, a man named "Henry Bridgeman," also promised the ship to the governor as a gift once his crew unloaded the cargo.

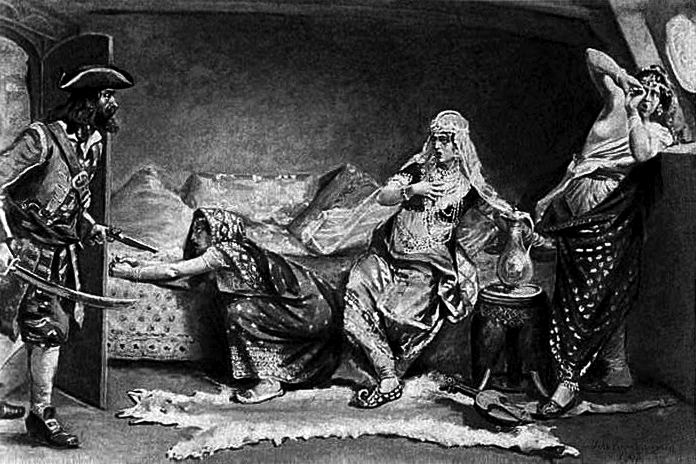
An early 20th-century painting depicting Captain Every's encounter with Emperor Aurangzeb's granddaughter and her retinue

For Trott, this proved a tempting offer. The Nine Years' War had been raging for eight years, and the island, which the Royal Navy had not visited in several years, was perilously underpopulated. Trott knew that the French had recently captured Exuma, 140 miles (230 km) to the southeast, and were now headed for New Providence. With only sixty or seventy men living in the town, half of whom served guard duty at any one time, there was no practical way to keep Nassau's twenty-eight cannons fully manned. However, if Fancy's crew stayed in Nassau it would more than double the island's male population, while the very presence of the heavily armed ship in the harbour might deter a French attack. On the other hand, turning away "Bridgeman" might spell disaster if his intentions turned violent, as his crew of 113 (plus ninety slaves) would easily defeat the island's inhabitants. Lastly, there was also the bribe to consider, which was three times Trott's annual salary of £300.

Trott called a meeting of Nassau's governing council, likely arguing that interloping was a fairly common crime and not a sufficient reason for turning away the men, whose presence now aided Nassau's security. The council agreed to allow Fancy to enter the harbour, apparently having never been told of the private bribe. Trott sent a letter to Every instructing him that his crew "were welcome to come and to go as they pleased". Soon after, Trott met Every personally on land in what must have been a closed-door meeting. Fancy was then handed over to the governor, who found that extra bribes—fifty tons of ivory tusks, one hundred barrels of gunpowder, several chests of firearms and ammunition, and an assortment of ship anchors—had been left in the hold for him.

The wealth of foreign-minted coins could not have escaped Trott. He must have known that the ship's crew were not merely unlicensed slavers, likely noting the patched-up battle damage on Fancy. When word eventually reached that the Royal Navy and the EIC were hunting for Fancy and that "Captain Bridgeman" was Every himself, Trott denied ever knowing anything about the pirates' history other than what they told him, adamant that the island's population "saw no reason to disbelieve them". This he argued despite the fact that the proclamation for the pirates' capture specifically warned that Every's crew could "probably be known and discovered by the great quantities of Gold and Silver of foreign Coines which they have with them." In the meantime, however, Every's men were free to frequent the town's pubs. Nevertheless, the crew soon found themselves disappointed with the Bahamas; the islands were sparsely populated, meaning that there was virtually no place to spend the money they had pirated. For the next several months the pirates spent most of their time living in relative boredom. By now Trott had stripped Fancy of everything valuable, and it was lost after being violently driven against some rocks, perhaps deliberately on the orders of Trott, who was eager to rid himself of a key piece of evidence.

=== Disappearance ===
Burgess argues that when the proclamation for the apprehension of Every and his crew reached Trott, he was forced to either put a warrant out for Every's arrest or, failing to do so, effectively disclose his association with the pirate. Preferring the former choice for the sake of his reputation, he alerted the authorities as to the pirates' whereabouts but was able to tip off Every and his crew before the authorities arrived. Every's 113-person crew then fashioned their hasty escape, vanishing from the island with only twenty-four men ever captured, five of whom were executed. Every himself was never seen again. His last words to his men were a litany of conflicting stories of where he planned to go, likely intended to throw pursuers off his trail.

It has been suggested that because Every was unable to buy a pardon from Trott or from the governor of Jamaica, his crew split up, some remaining in the West Indies, the majority heading to North America, and the rest, including Every himself, returning to England. Of these, some sailed aboard the sloop Isaac, while Every and about twenty other men sailed in the sloop Seaflower (captained by Faro) to Ireland towards the end of June 1696. They aroused suspicions while unloading their treasure, and two of the men were subsequently caught. Every, however, was able to escape once again.

== Fate ==
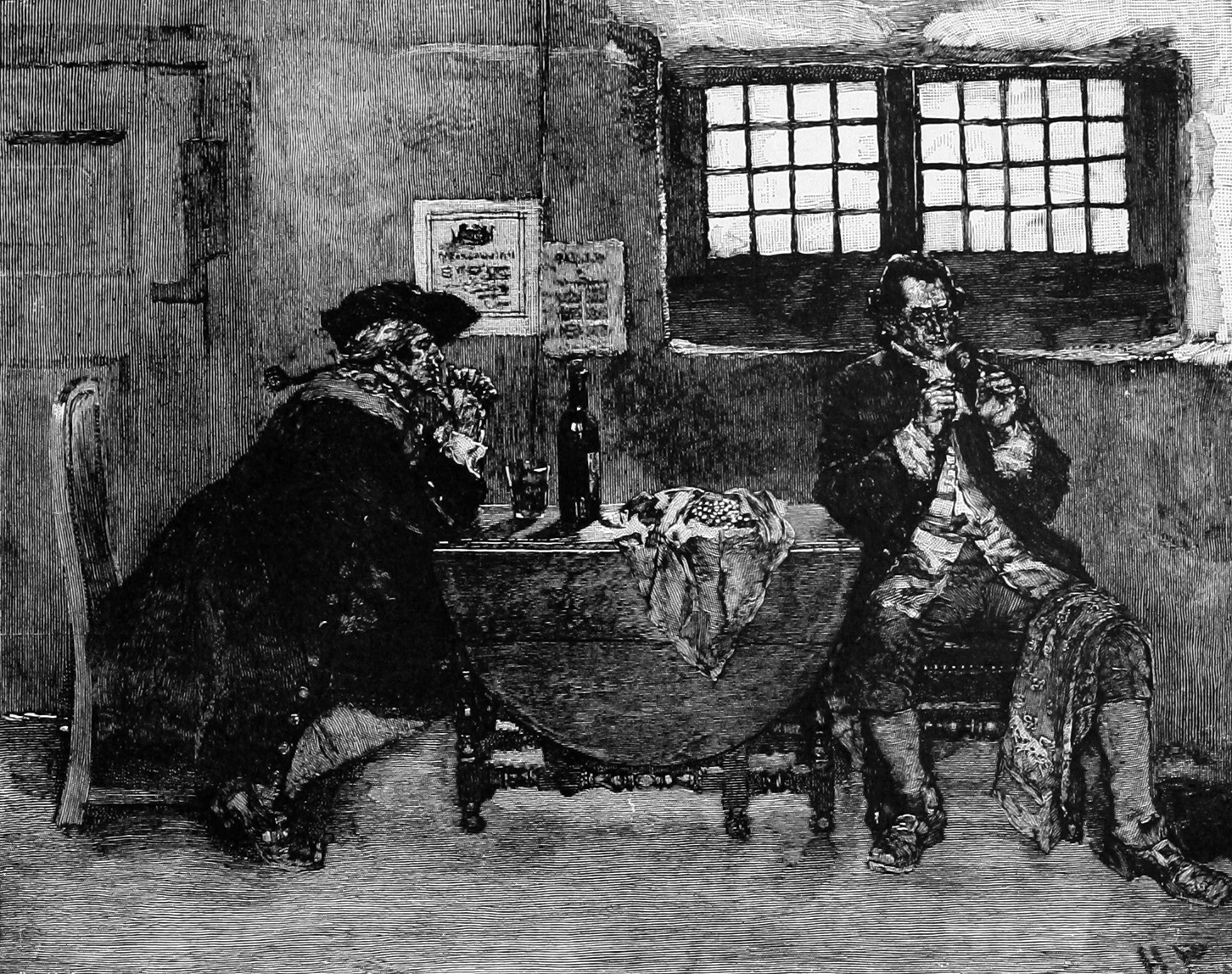
Avery sells his Jewels, an engraving by Howard Pyle which appeared in the September 1887 issue of Harper's Magazine

British author and pirate biographer Charles Johnson suggested that, after attempting to sell his diamonds, Every died in poverty in Devon after being cheated out of his wealth by Bristol merchants. It is, however, unclear how Johnson could have discovered this. If Every was known to be living in poverty, it is most likely that he would have been apprehended and the large bounty on his head collected. So ascribing this fate to Every may have been a type of moral propagandizing on Johnson's part. Others have suggested that after Every changed his name, he settled in Devon and lived out the rest of his life peacefully, dying on 10 June 1714; however, the source for this information is The History and Lives of All the Most Notorious Pirates and their Crews (London: Edw. Midwinter, 1732), considered an unreliable (and slightly expanded) reprint of Johnson's General History. In October 1781 John Knill, the Collector of Customs at St Ives, Cornwall, held a meeting with a supposed descendant of Every (Note: There is no evidence that Every had any children.) who stated that his "father had told him that Captain Every, after wandering about in great poverty and distress, had died in Barnstaple, and was buried as a pauper ..."

As the manhunt for Every continued in the decade following his disappearance, sightings were frequently reported, but none proved reliable. After the publication of a fictional memoir in 1709, which claimed Every was a king ruling a pirate utopia in Madagascar, popular accounts increasingly took on a more legendary, romantic flavour (see In contemporary literature). Although such stories were widely believed to be true by the public, they had no basis in reality. No reliable information about Every's whereabouts or activities emerged after June 1696.

A 2024 book alleges that Every survived to covertly enter service as a Royal spy with the assistance of Daniel Defoe, largely on the basis of a coded letter attributed to "Avery the Pirate." (Note: The letter's authenticity and its attribution to Every remain unproven.)

== Fate of Every's crew ==
=== North American colonies ===
About 75 of Every's crew sailed to North America in hopes of escaping the transcontinental manhunt. His crew members were sighted in the Carolinas, New England, and in Pennsylvania; some even bribed Pennsylvania Governor William Markham for £100 per man. This was enough to buy the governor's allegiance, who was aware of their identity and reportedly even allowed one to marry his daughter. Although other local officials, notably magistrate Captain Robert Snead, tried to have the pirates arrested, the governor's protection ensured that they remained audacious enough to boast of their exploits "publicly over their cups". When Snead's persistence started to irritate the governor, the magistrate was reprehended:

He [Markham] called me rascal and dared me to issue my warrants against these men, saying that he had a good mind to commit me. I told him that were he not Governor I would not endure such language, and that it was hard to be so treated for doing my duty. He then ordered the constables not to serve any more of my warrants; moreover being greatly incensed he wrote a warrant with his own hand to the Sheriff to disarm me.

Maryland, Massachusetts, New York, Virginia, and other colonies published the proclamation authorizing Every's arrest, but rarely went beyond this. Although harbouring pirates became more dangerous for the colonial governors over time, only seven of Every's crew were tried between 1697 and 1705, and all of these were acquitted.

Ancient coins allegedly taken from Ganj-i-Sawai were discovered in 2014 at Sweet Berry Farm in Middletown, Rhode Island. Later on, more coins were unearthed in Massachusetts, Rhode Island, Connecticut and North Carolina.

=== British Isles ===
John Dann (Every's coxswain) born in East Hoathly, Sussex, was arrested on 30 July 1696 for suspected piracy at the Bull Hotel, a coaching inn on the High Street of Rochester, Kent. He had sewn £1,045 in gold sequins and ten English guineas into his waistcoat, which was discovered by his chambermaid, who subsequently reported the discovery to the town's mayor, collecting a reward in the process. In order to avoid the possibility of execution, on 3 August Dann agreed to testify against other captured members of Every's crew, joining Middleton, who had given himself up to authorities a few weeks prior. Soon after, twenty-four of Every's men had been rounded up, some having been reported to authorities by jewellers and goldsmiths after trying to sell their treasure. In the next several months, fifteen of the pirates were brought to trial and six were convicted. As piracy was a capital crime, and the death penalty could be handed down only if there were eyewitnesses, the testimony of Dann and Middleton was crucial.

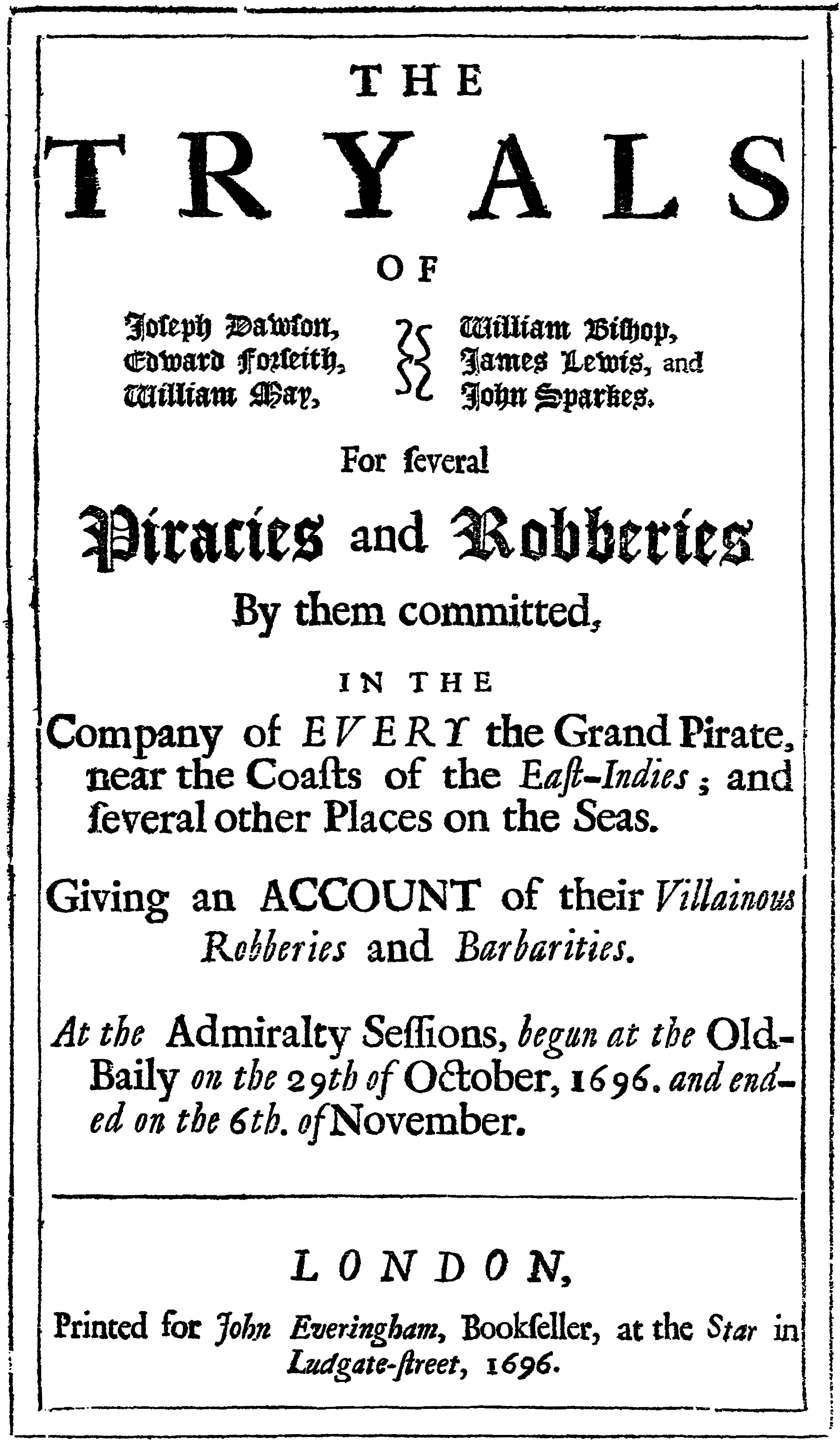
The title page of the report issued in 1696 by the High Court of Admiralty following the trial of Every's crew

The six defendants—Joseph Dawson, 39 years old, from Yarmouth; Edward Forseith, 45, Newcastle upon Tyne; William May, 48, London; William Bishop, 20, Devon; James Lewis, 25, London; and John Sparkes, 19, London—were indicted on charges of committing piracy on Ganj-i-Sawai, with the trial commencing on 19 October 1696 at the Old Bailey. The government assembled the most prominent judges in the country to attend the trial, consisting of presiding judge Sir Charles Hedges, Lieutenant of the High Court of Admiralty; Sir John Holt, Chief Justice of the King's Bench; Sir George Treby, Chief Justice of the Common Pleas; and six other prominent judges. Other than Joseph Dawson, all the pirates pleaded not guilty.

One of the witnesses against the accused mutineers was David Creagh, second officer of Charles II. He testified that after refusing to participate in the mutiny—the only officer to do so—he was ordered to return below deck. On the way to his cabin, Creagh encountered May, Captain Gibson's former steward. May, described by Every as one of the "true cocks of the game, and old sportsmen", was zealously supportive of the mutiny, and Creagh testified of their exchange:

I met with W. May, the Prisoner at the Bar. What do you say here? says he. I made him no Answer, but went down to my Cabin; and he said, God damn you, you deserve to be shot through the Head; and he then held a Pistol to my Head. Then I went to my Cabin, and presently came orders from Every, that those that would go ashore, should prepare to be gone. And when the Captain was got out of Bed, who was then very ill of a Feaver, Every came and said, I am a Man of Fortune, and must seek my Fortune.

Despite considerable pressure on the jury to find the defendants guilty, with Judge Advocate of the Admiralty Dr Sir Thomas Newton reminding the jury that the consequences of an acquittal would be "the total loss of the Indian trade, and thereby the impoverishment of this kingdom", the jury passed a verdict of not guilty.

The shocked court rushed through another indictment, and twelve days later the pirates were tried on a different set of charges, this time on account of conspiring to steal Charles II with piratical intent. Although their position would be legally dubious today, the 17th-century court imposed on the defendants the legal burden of proving themselves innocent of mutiny, having been found aboard "a ship...run away with." As before, the court continually stressed the need for the pirates' conviction. Judge Hedges condemned the "dishonourable" former jury and instructed their successors to act with "a true English spirit" by passing a conviction, repeatedly reminding them to "support...the navigation, trade, wealth, strength, reputation, and glory of this nation." This time, the jury returned a guilty verdict.

The pirates were given their last chance to show why they should be spared execution, with most simply claiming ignorance and pleading for mercy. May argued that, being "a very sickly man", he had "never acted in all the voyage", while Bishop reminded the court that he was "forced away", and, being only eighteen years of age during the 1694 mutiny, desired mercy. Dawson, the only defendant to plead guilty, was granted a reprieve. The remainder of the death sentences were upheld. Sparkes was the only pirate to publicly express some regret, but not for piracy, which was of "lesser concern"—instead, he was repentant for the "horrid barbarities he had committed, though only on the bodies of the heathen", implying that he had participated in the violation of the women aboard the Mughal ships. His "Last Dying Words and Confession" declared that his eyes were "now open to his crimes", and he "justly suffered death for such inhumanity".

On 25 November 1696, the five prisoners were taken to the gallows at Execution Dock. Here they solemnly gave their dying speeches before a gathered crowd, which included Newgate Prison ordinary Paul Lorrain. As they faced the River Thames, from where the Spanish Expedition voyage had begun only three years earlier, the pirates were hanged.

Dann escaped the hangman by turning King's witness. However, he remained in England, having received on 9 August 1698 an, "Order for one Dann, lately Every's mate but pardoned, to attend the Board to-morrow." This he did on 11 August at the East India House, giving details of his voyage and plunder on board Fancy. In 1699, Dann married Eliza Noble and the following year became a partner to John Coggs, a well-established goldsmith banker, creating Coggs & Dann at the sign of the King's Head in the Strand, London. The bankers (particularly Dann) were duped by fraudster Thomas Brerewood, one of their clients, and in 1710 the bank became insolvent. Dann died in 1722.

== Career wealth ==
=== Ganj-i-Sawai ===
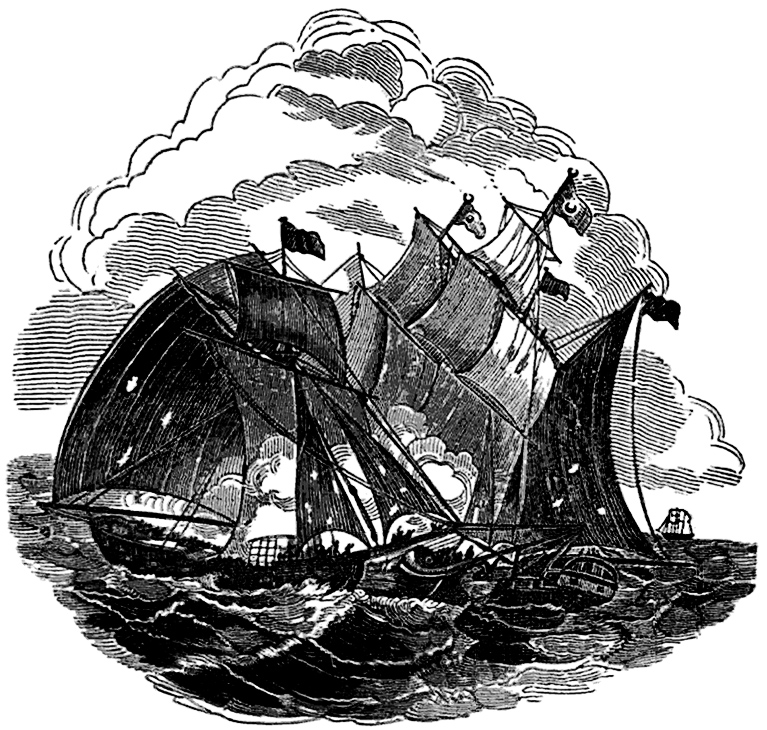
A woodcut from The Pirates Own Book showing the Fancy engaging the Ganj-i-Sawai.

The value of Ganj-i-Sawai's cargo is not known with certainty. Contemporary estimates differed by as much as £300,000, with £325,000 and £600,000 being the traditionally cited numbers. The latter estimate was the value provided by the Mughal authorities, while the EIC estimated the loss at approximately £325,000, nevertheless filing a £600,000 insurance claim.

It has been suggested that the EIC argued for the lowest estimate when paying reparations for Every's raid, with the company's president naturally wanting the most conservative estimate in order to pay as little for the damages as possible. Others contend that the Mughal authorities' figure of £600,000 was a deliberate overestimate aimed at improving their compensation from the English. While some historians have argued that £325,000 was probably closer to the true value, partly because this agreed with the estimate provided by contemporary Scottish merchant Alexander Hamilton, then stationed in Surat, and partly for the above reasons, others have criticized this position as being largely unsubstantiated.

Although Every's capture of Ganj-i-Sawai has been cited as piracy's greatest exploit, it is possible that other pirates have perpetrated even more profitable raids. In April 1721, John Taylor and Olivier Levasseur captured the 700-ton Portuguese galleon Nossa Senhora do Cabo ("Our Lady of the Cape"), bound to Lisbon from the Portuguese colony of Goa. It had been damaged in an Indian Ocean storm and was undergoing repairs at the French island of Réunion when the pirates struck. Reportedly carrying the retiring Luís Carlos Inácio Xavier de Meneses, 1st Marquis of Louriçal, the galleon was laden with silver, gold, diamonds, gems, as well as pearls, silks, spices, works of art, and church regalia belonging to the Patriarch of the East Indies. The total value of the treasure on board has been estimated as being anywhere from £100,000 to £875,000 (£500,000 in diamonds and £375,000 in other cargo), all of which was divided among the crews of Cassandra and Victory, captained by Taylor and Levasseur respectively. If the latter number is correct, it would far eclipse Every's haul.

Historian Jan Rogoziński has called Cabo "the richest plunder ever captured by any pirate", estimating its reported treasure of £875,000 to be worth "more than $400 million." In comparison, Rogoziński's analysis in 2000 claimed that the EIC's estimate of £325,000 for Ganj-i-Sawai's goods equals "at least $200 million" while stating that the larger estimate of £600,000 taken would be equivalent to $400 million in 2000, approximately rivalling the raid committed by Taylor and Levasseur. In any case, if one accepts the EIC's estimate of £325,000, Rogoziński writes that even then "only two or three times in history did criminals take more valuable loot".

=== Other ships ===
Fateh Muhammed's cargo was valued at £50,000–60,000 according to the estimate provided by Dann at his trial; Rogoziński's calculations in 2000 valued this at $30 million in modern currency. Every is known to have captured at least eleven vessels by September 1695, including Ganj-i-Sawai. Aside from Emperor Aurangzeb's fleet, one of the more fruitful prizes was Rampura, a Cambay trading ship that produced the "surprising haul of 1,700,000 rupees."

== Legacy ==
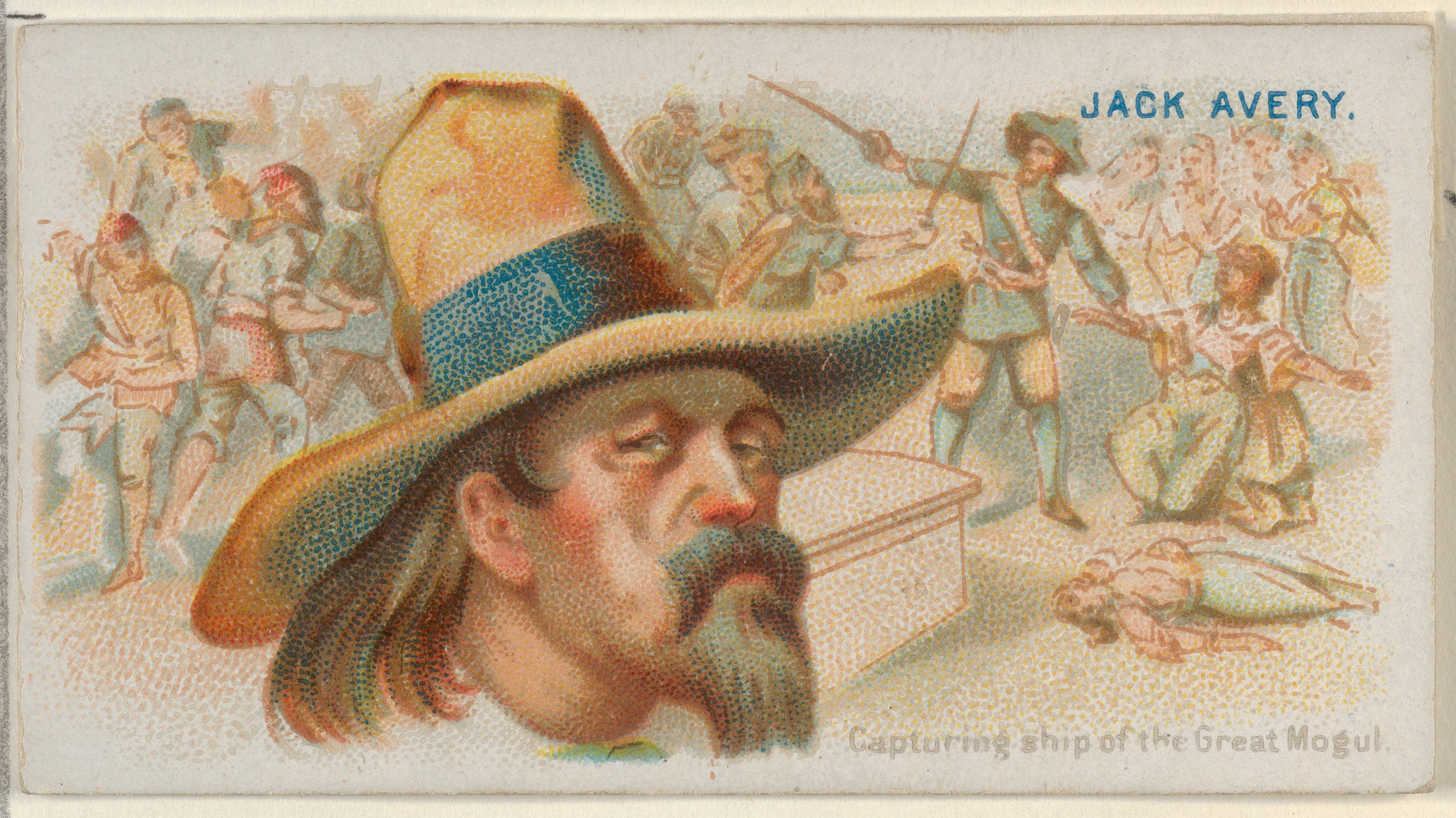
Jack Avery, "Capturing Ship of the Great Mogul", depicted on a cigarette card, c.1888

=== Influence among pirates ===
Every's exploits immediately captivated the public's imagination, and some considered him a sort of gallant maritime Robin Hood who exemplified the working class idea that rebellion and piracy were acceptable ways to fight back against unfair captains and societies. By joining the pantheon of other "noble pirates", including Francis Drake and Henry Morgan, Every doubtlessly inspired many others to take up piracy. In particular, Every accomplished his feats while many infamous pirates of the post-Spanish-Succession period—Blackbeard, Bartholomew Roberts, John Rackham, Samuel Bellamy, Edward Low, Stede Bonnet, and others—were still children, and his exploits had become legendary by the time they were young men.

English pirate Walter Kennedy, who was born the same year Ganj-i-Sawai was plundered, had learned of Every's story at a young age and committed it to memory. When he retired from piracy, he returned to London to spend his riches, even opening a brothel in Deptford. However, in 1721, he was arrested and sentenced to death. While he awaited his execution, Kennedy's favourite pastime was recounting tales of Every's adventures.

Another Irishman, Edward England, one-time quartermaster to Charles Vane, spent most of his career in the Indian Ocean raiding Mughal ships in much the same way Every had done two decades earlier. After parting ways with Vane, Edward England raided slave ships off the coast of West Africa. In 1720, he captured a 300-ton Dutch East Indiaman of 34 guns off the Malabar Coast and renamed his new flagship to Fancy. However, he was subsequently marooned on Mauritius by his mutinous crew after refusing to grant them permission to torture their captives. After fashioning a makeshift raft, he drifted to the very island believed to be ruled of the King of Pirates himself. No pirate utopia awaited him, however, and he died an alcoholic beggar. Ironically, this was the fictional but moralized fate Charles Johnson ascribed to Every in his General History. It has been suggested that, like Every before him, England had a "brief, yet spectacular career", and he may have come "closest to living out the Every legend."

=== In contemporary literature ===
Some fictional and semi-biographical accounts of Every were published in the decades following his disappearance. In 1709, the first such account appeared as a 16-page pamphlet titled The Life and Adventures of Capt. John Avery; the Famous English Pirate, Now in Possession of Madagascar (London: J. Baker, 1709). It was written by an anonymous author who, using the pseudonym "Adrian van Broeck," claimed to be a Dutchman who endured captivity by Every's crew. In the account, Every is depicted as both a treacherous pirate and a romantic lover; after he raids the Mughal's ship, he runs off with—and later marries—the Emperor's daughter. The couple then flee the Mughal's army to Saint Mary's Island, where Every sets up a pirate utopia similar to the fictional pirate state of Libertalia. Every even has several children with the princess and establishes a new monarchy. The King of Madagascar soon commands an army of 15,000 pirates and a fleet of 40 warships, and is said to be living in fantastic luxury in an impregnable fortress beyond the reach of his English and Mughal adversaries. Furthermore, Every mints his own currency: gold coins engraved in his royal likeness.

Although wild rumours of Every's fate had been circulating for years, Adrian van Broeck's fictionalized biography provided the popular legend of Every that was to be borrowed by subsequent publications. Over time, much of the English public came to believe the memoir's sensationalist claims. European governments were soon receiving people who claimed to be Every's ambassadors from Saint Mary's, and as the legend grew even heads of state started to believe the astonishing stories. At one point, "English and Scottish officials at the highest level gave serious attention to the proposals of these 'pirate diplomats'," while Peter the Great "tried to hire the Saint Mary's pirates to help build a Russian colony on Madagascar." The idea of a pirate haven on Saint Mary's had become a household idea.

Owing to his notoriety, Every was, along with Blackbeard, one of the few pirates whose life was dramatized on stage. In 1712, playwright Charles Johnson published his highly romanticized tragicomedy The Successful Pyrate. It proved to be at once both controversial and successful and was performed to regaled audiences at the Theatre Royal in Drury Lane, appearing in print in London the following year. The play was not without its detractors, however. Dramatist and critic John Dennis wrote a letter to the Master of the Revels criticizing him for licensing the play, which he blasted as "a prostitution of the stage, an encouragement to villainy, and a disgrace to the theatre". Nevertheless, the play ran into several editions.

In 1720 Every appeared as the primary character of Daniel Defoe's The King of Pirates and as a minor character in his novel Captain Singleton. Both tales acknowledged the widely believed stories of Every's pirate republic. It was Charles Johnson's influential General History (1724) that established the competing account of Every. Arriving over a decade after Adrian van Broeck's memoir, Johnson's "historical" account revealed that Every was cheated of his wealth after attempting to sell his ill-gotten goods, in the end "not being worth as much as would buy him a coffin". Yet another account appeared in The Famous Adventures of Captain John Avery of Plymouth, a Notorious Pirate (London: T. Johnston, 1809), although this is likely a retelling of earlier publications.

In addition to the play and books written about Henry Every, a successful ballad was also printed in England during his career. Titled "A Copy of Verses, Composed by Captain Henry Every, Lately Gone to Sea to seek his Fortune," it was first published as a broadside sometime between May and July 1694 by the London printer Theophilus Lewis, and was reportedly written by Every himself. Consisting of 13 stanzas set to the tune of the 1686 ballad "The Success of Two English Travellers; Newly Arrived in London," it was subsequently collected by Samuel Pepys and added to the Pepys Library. At least 9 different reprints of the ballad, of varying similarity to the original published by Lewis, were printed between 1694 and 1907. More recently, the ballad has been featured in Roy Palmer's Oxford Book of Sea Songs (New York: Oxford University Press, 1986).

"A Copy of Verses" contains a few statements, such as Every's declaration to have been "part-owner" of land near Plymouth, that were later corroborated by William Philips, the captured crew member with whom Every had once shared information. Despite this, it is unlikely Every wrote the verses. A more likely scenario is that one of the approx. 15 or 20 loyal sailors who refused to join the mutiny had shared their knowledge of Every upon returning to England, where it was quickly turned into a ballad. A slightly modified copy was delivered to the Privy Council of England by Sir James Houblon on 10 August 1694, where it was used as evidence during the inquiry on the mutiny. By announcing Every's supposed intentions of turning pirate even before the mutiny was carried out, the ballad may have served to strengthen the council's convictions that the mutinous crew harboured piratical intentions from the outset. It is thus possible that the ballad was written and distributed as a way to convict Every. In any case, the strength of the ballad likely played a role in the government's outlawing of Every nearly two years before he had become known as the most infamous pirate of his time.

During Every's career, the government used the media to portray him as a notorious criminal in an effort to sway public opinion on piracy, but the result has been described as a "near-total failure". Much of the public continued to remain sympathetic to the pirate's cause.

=== Every's flag ===
Every's flag seen in A General History of Pyrates

Every's flag described in A Copy of Verses

Red Henry Every's Jolly Roger

Black Henry Every's Jolly Roger

There are no reliable contemporary accounts of Every's pirate flag, and the depictions created afterwards are both contradictory and of dubious origin.

The 1724 book A General History of the Pyrates credited Every with flying a black flag emblazoned with two crossed bones forming an X.

According to the ballad "A Copy of Verses," Every's "shield" was red with four gold chevrons and bordered in green. This may have been intended to describe his flag. Although red was a popular colour for pirate flags of the time, the meaning of the four chevrons is not certain; it may have been an attempt (justified or not) to link Every with the West-Country gentry clan of Every whose coats-of-arms showed similar chevrons.

Another flag later ascribed to Every depicts a white skull in profile wearing a kerchief and an earring, above a saltire of two crossed bones, on a black or red field. This claim appears to have been invented for Hans Leip's 1959 book Bordbuch des Satans.

There is no reliable evidence that Every actually flew any of the flags now associated with him.

=== In modern popular culture ===
- A pirate captain named "Avery" is repeatedly mentioned in the 1966 Doctor Who serial The Smugglers; the plot centres on the search for Avery's treasure. The 2011 Doctor Who episode "The Curse of the Black Spot," features a pirate captain named Henry Avery, played by Hugh Bonneville. The fictional Avery is depicted as having started his career in the Royal Navy before turning pirate, being dedicated to his wife and children, and having captured a great treasure from an Indian Mughal. It also provides a fictional aetiology for his disappearance. In a "prequel" released by the BBC prior to the episode, the fictional Avery names his vessel as "the good ship Fancy." Four episodes later, in "A Good Man Goes to War," the Doctor recruits Avery and son in their new capacity as space pirates to assist him at the Battle of Demon's Run.
- George Macdonald Fraser's 1983 novel The Pyrates traces the adventures of Captain Benjamin Avery, very loosely based on Henry Avery. In 1986 the BBC released a movie adaptation of the novel with Marcus Gilbert in the role of Long Ben Avery.
- Henry Every is mentioned repeatedly in the 2014–2017 TV series Black Sails, a prequel to Treasure Island. He is credited with inventing the Black Spot and discovering the Treasure Island.
- Henry Avery is the focus of the 2016 video game Uncharted 4: A Thief's End, in which protagonist Nathan Drake and his brother Samuel hunt for his treasure. In the game, it is revealed that after founding the pirate utopia Libertalia, Avery and Thomas Tew killed each other over its treasure, with their corpses resting aboard Avery's ship on the island off the coast of Madagascar where Libertalia was built.

== See also ==
- Golden Age of Piracy
- List of fugitives from justice who disappeared
- List of pirates
- Piracy Act 1698

== Bibliography ==
- Baer, Joel H. (1994). "'Captain John Avery' and the Anatomy of a Mutiny". Eighteenth-Century Life. 18 (1). Johns Hopkins University Press: 1–26. ISSN 0098-2601.
- Baer, Joel H. (1995). "Bold Captain Avery in the Privy Council: Early Variants of a Broadside Ballad from the Pepys Collection". Folk Music Journal. 7 (1). English Folk Dance and Song Society: 4–26. ISSN 0531-9684.
- Baer, Joel H. (2005). Pirates of the British Isles. London: Tempus Publishing. ISBN 978-0-7524-2304-3.
- Baker, David Erskine; Reed, Isaac; Jones, Stephen (1812). Biographia Dramatica; or, A Companion to the Playhouse. Vol. 3. London: Longman, Hurst, Rees, Orme, and Brown [etc.].
- Botting, Douglas (1978). The Pirates. Alexandria, VA: Time-Life Books. ISBN 978-0-8094-2650-8.
- Breverton, Terry (2004). Black Bart Roberts: The Greatest Pirate of Them All. Gretna, LA: Pelican Publishing. ISBN 1-58980-233-0.
- Bruce, Peter Henry (1782). Memoirs of Peter Henry Bruce, Esq. London: T. Payne, and Son, Mewsgate.
- Burgess, Douglas R. (2009a). The Pirates' Pact: The Secret Alliances Between History's Most Notorious Buccaneers and Colonial America. New York: McGraw-Hill. ISBN 978-0-07-147476-4.
- Burgess, Douglas R. (2009b). "Piracy in the Public Sphere: The Henry Every Trials and the Battle for Meaning in Seventeenth-Century Print Culture". Journal of British Studies. 48 (4). The University of Chicago Press: 887–913. doi:10.1086/603599. S2CID 145637922.
- Dann, John (2019). Mr Bridgman's Accomplice – Long Ben's Coxswain 1660–1722. FastPrint. ISBN 978-178456-636-4.
- Davis, Ralph (1962). The Rise of the English Shipping Industry in the Seventeenth and Eighteenth Centuries. London: Macmillan Publishers.
- Dow, George Francis; Edmonds, John Henry (1996) [1923]. The Pirates of the New England Coast 1630–1730. Mineola, NY: Dover Publications. ISBN 978-0-486-29064-5.
- Earle, Peter (2006). The Pirate Wars. New York: St. Martin's Griffin. ISBN 978-0-312-33580-9.
- Ellms, Charles (1837). The Pirates Own Book. Portland, OR: Sanborn & Carter.
- Emlyn, Sollom, ed. (1730). A Complete Collection of State-Trials, and Proceedings upon High-Treason, and Other Crimes and Misdemeanours; from the Reign of King Richard II to the End of the Reign of King George I. Vol. 5 (2nd ed.). London: J. Walthoe Sen. [etc.] OCLC 2730073.
- Fox, E. T. (2008). King of the Pirates: The Swashbuckling Life of Henry Every. London: Tempus Publishing. ISBN 978-0-7524-4718-6.
- Fraser, George MacDonald (1983). The Pyrates. London: William Collins & Sons. ISBN 0-330-28390-1.
- Gosse, Philip (1924). The Pirates' Who's Who. New York: Burt Franklin.
- Grey, Charles (1933). Pirates of the Eastern Seas (1618–1723): A Lurid Page of History. London: Sampson Low, Marston & Co. OCLC 499970.
- Elliot, Henry Miers; Dowson, John, eds. (1877). The History of India, as Told by Its Own Historians: The Muhammadan Period. Vol. 7. London: Trübner & Co.
- Jameson, John Franklin (1923). "Case of Henry Every". Privateering and Piracy in the Colonial Period: Illustrative Documents. New York: Macmillan Publishers. pp. 153–188.
- Johnson, Charles (1980) [1709]. The Life and Adventures of Capt. John Avery. University of California, Los Angeles: The Augustan Reprint Society.
- Keay, John (1991). The Honourable Company: A History of the English East India Company. London: HarperCollins. ISBN 978-0-00-217515-9.
- Konstam, Angus (2008). Piracy: The Complete History. Oxford: Osprey Publishing. ISBN 978-1-84603-240-0.
- Laughton, John Knox (1885). "Avery, John" . In Stephen, Leslie (ed.). Dictionary of National Biography. Vol. 2. London: Smith, Elder & Co.
- Marley, David F. (2010). Pirates of the Americas. Santa Barbara, CA: ABC-CLIO. ISBN 978-1-59884-201-2.
- Marley, David F. (2012). Daily Life of Pirates. Santa Barbara, CA: Greenwood Press. ISBN 978-0-313-39563-5.
- McCarthy, Tom, ed. (2006). Incredible Pirate Tales: Fourteen Classic Stories of Outlaws on the High Seas. Guilford, CT: Lyons Press. ISBN 978-1-59228-284-5.
- Phillips, Thomas (1744) [1732], "A Journal of a Voyage Made in the Hannibal of London", in Churchill, Awnsham; Churchill, John (eds.), A Collection of Voyages and Travels, Some Now first Printed from Original Manuscripts, Others Now first Published in English. In Six Volumes, vol. 6, London, pp. 171–239
- Price, Frederick George Hilton, ed. (1891). A Handbook of London Bankers, With Some Account of Their Predecessors the Early Goldsmiths. London: Leadenhall Press.
- Pringle, Patrick (2001) [1953]. Jolly Roger: The Story of the Great Age of Piracy. Mineola, NY: Dover. ISBN 0-486-41823-5.
- Rediker, Marcus (2004). Villains of All Nations: Atlantic Pirates in the Golden Age. Boston: Beacon Press. ISBN 978-0-8070-5024-8.
- Rogoziński, Jan (2000). Honor Among Thieves: Captain Kidd, Henry Every, and the Pirate Democracy in the Indian Ocean. Mechanicsburg, PA: Stackpole Books. ISBN 978-0-8117-1529-4.
- Saletore, Rajaram Narayan (1978). Indian Pirates: From the Earliest Times to the Present Day. Delhi: Concept Publishing. OCLC 5414009.
- Sherry, Frank (1986). Raiders and Rebels: The Golden Age of Piracy. New York: Hearst Marine Books. ISBN 978-0-688-04684-2.
- Travers, Tim (2007). Pirates: A History. London: Tempus Publishing. ISBN 978-0-7524-3936-5.
- Woodard, Colin (2007). The Republic of Pirates: Being the True and Surprising Story of the Caribbean Pirates and the Man Who Brought Them Down. Orlando, FL: Houghton Mifflin Harcourt. ISBN 978-0-15-101302-9.
- Wright, Arnold (1918). Annesley of Surat and His Times, the True Story of the Mythical Wesley Fortune. London: Andrew Melrose.
