= Ganj-i-Sawai =

Armed Mughal trading ship captured by pirates in 1695

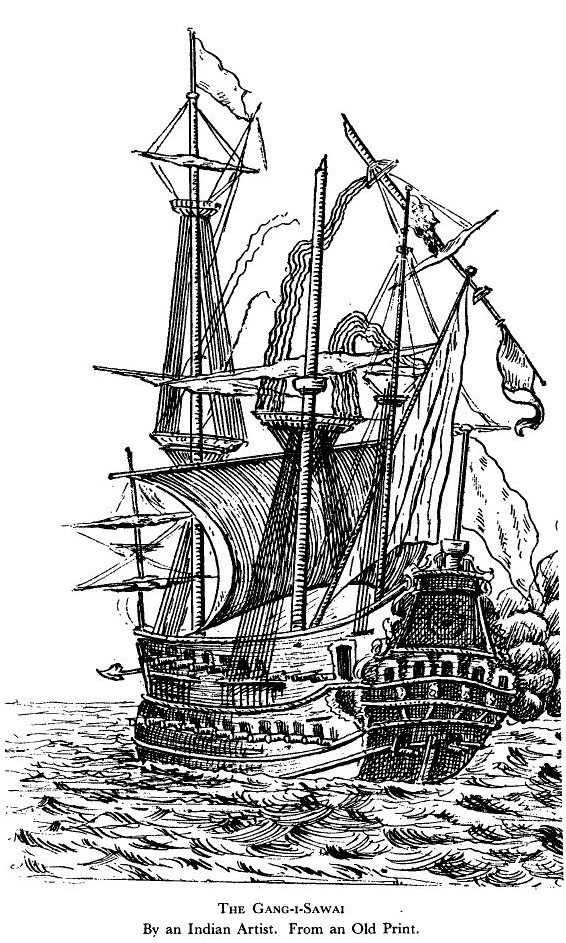
- A later (1933) interpretation of Ganj-i-Sawai. The ship is inaccurately depicted as an East Indiaman.

History
- Name: Ganj-i-Sawai
- Owner: Mariam-uz-Zamani; Jahangir; Shah Jahan; Aurangzeb
- Ordered: In 1614 by Empress Mariam-uz-Zamani
- Launched: 1616
- Completed: 1616
- Maiden voyage: 1617
- Out of service: 7 September 1695
- Fate: Seized by pirates

General characteristics
- Type: Ghanjah sailing ship
- Displacement: 1500 to 1600 tons
- Complement: 1100–1300 total, 400–500 of which were soldiers
- Armament: 40–80 guns/ 800 guns

The Ganj-i-Sawai (Persian/Hindustani: Ganj-i-Sawai, in English "Exceeding Treasure", often anglicized as Gunsway) was an armed ship belonging to the Mughals. During Aurangzeb's reign, it was captured on 7 September 1695 by the English pirate Henry Every en route from present-day Mokha, Yemen, to Surat, India. It was built on the order of Empress Mariam-uz-Zamani, great-grandmother of Aurangzeb, after the capture of her ship named Rahīmī.

== Capture by pirates ==
In August 1695, Henry Every, captaining the 46-gun, 5th rate frigate Fancy, reached the Mandab Strait, where he teamed up with five other pirate ships, including Thomas Tew's 8-gun, 46-man sloop-of-war Amity, Richard Want in Dolphin, Joseph Faro in Portsmouth Adventure, Thomas Wake in Susannah, and William Maze in Pearl. Although a Mughal convoy of 25 ships bound for India had eluded the pirate fleet during the night, the following day they encountered Ganj-i-Sawai and her escort Fateh Muhammed with both stragglers passing the straits en route to Surat.

Every and his men attacked Fateh Muhammed, which had earlier repulsed an attack by Amity, killing Captain Tew. Perhaps intimidated by Fancy's 46 guns or weakened by their earlier battle with Tew, Fateh Muhammed's crew put up little resistance, and Every's pirates sacked the ship and came away with £40,000 worth of treasure.

Every then sailed in pursuit of Ganj-i-Sawai, overtaking her about eight days out of Surat. Ganj-i-Sawai was a fearsome opponent, mounting 62 guns and carrying four to five hundred guards armed with small arms, as well as six hundred other passengers. But the opening volley by the pirate ships caused extensive damage to the Mughal ship, as one of the Ganj-i-Sawai's cannons exploded, killing some of its gunners and causing great confusion and demoralization among the crew, while Every's broadside shot his enemy's mainmast by the board. The larger Fancy drew alongside, and a number of her 113-man crew clambered aboard, overpowering the crew, passengers, and slaves of Ganj-i-Sawai.

The victorious pirates then subjected their captives to several days of horror, murdering prisoners at will, and using torture to force them to reveal the location of the ships' treasure.

The loot from Ganj-i-Sawai totaled between £325,000 and £600,000, including "some 500,000 gold and silver pieces, plus numerous jeweled baubles and miscellaneous silver cups, trinkets, and so on." Several crews went home empty-handed: Tew was dead, Want and Wake's ships were too slow and never made it to the battle, Faro made it to the Ganj-i-Sawai but never engaged, and Maze was present but Every took back their share of the loot after Pearl's crew tried to trade clipped coins to Fancy's men. Every had been asked by the other pirate captains to carry the treasure to an agreed upon location where it would be split among the various crews, as Fancy, with her 46 guns, carried the most fire power to guard it. Come nightfall, Every and his crew silently slipped away from the pirate armada, taking all Ganj-i-Sawai's treasure with them.

In response to the capture of Ganj-i-Sawai, the Mughal Emperor, Aurangzeb, sent his army to five key ports for English trade in India—Bombay, Surat, Broach, Agra, and Ahmedabad—to close them. Aurangzeb effectively cut off English trade with India as he refused to reopen the ports until Henry Every was caught and executed for his crimes. The East India Company reconciled with the Mughal Emperor by fully compensating his losses, and filed an insurance claim for £350,000, though Mughal authorities demanded this amount be doubled. The desire to see Every executed led to the first truly global manhunt in history, though he and the majority of his crew would never be caught. Six members of his crew were captured, tried, and executed, though they were not found guilty of seizing Ganj-i-Sawai, but rather a different ship.

== Gallery ==
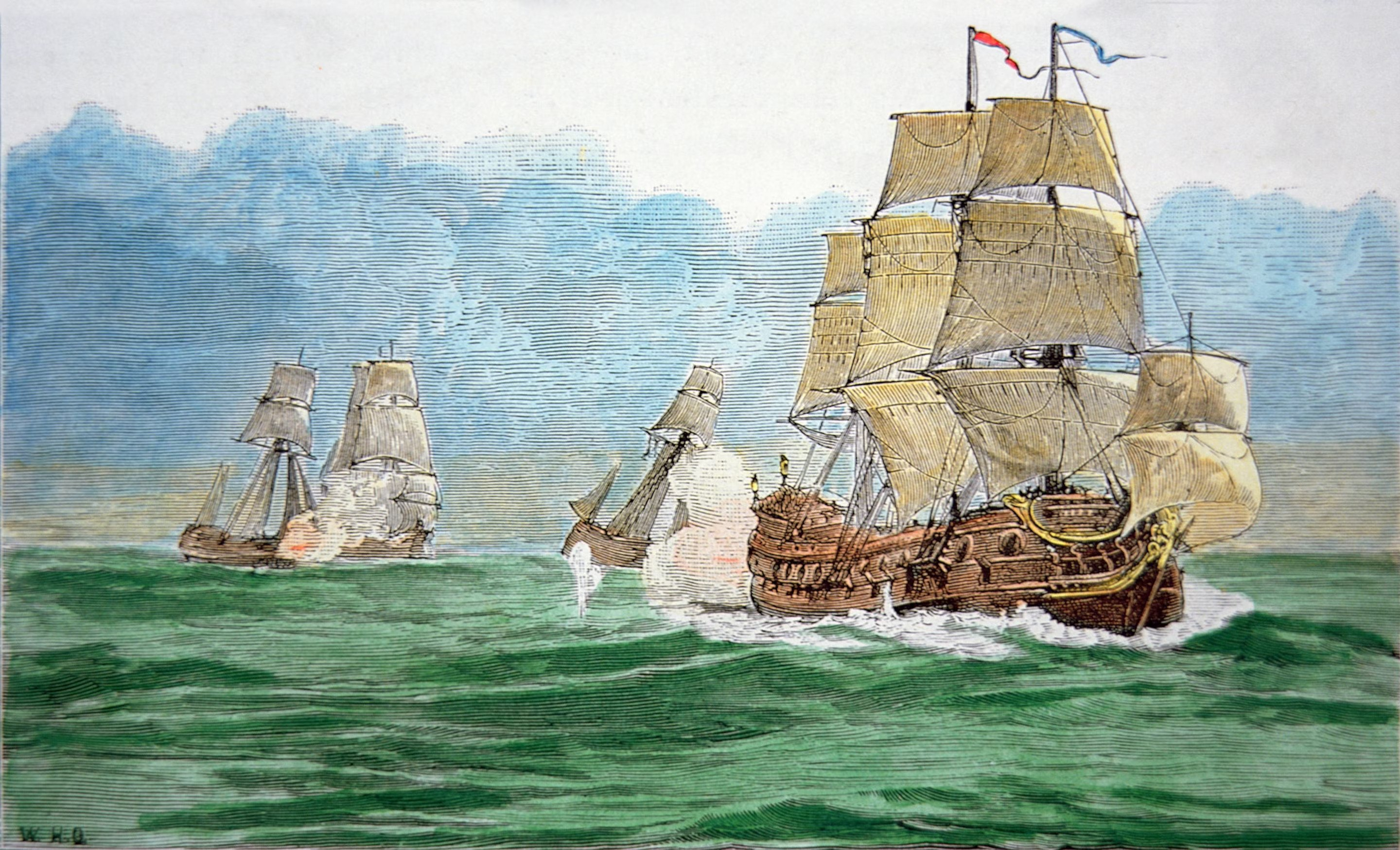
Ganj-i-Sawai being chased by Every's fleet. The ship is mistakenly depicted as an East Indiaman.

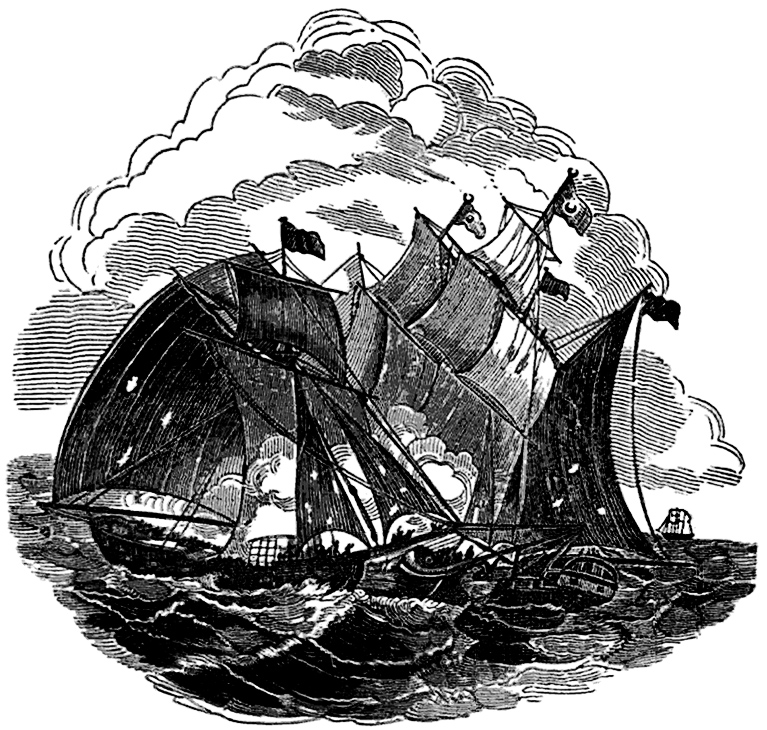
Illustration of Ganj-i-Sawai (center) being attacked.

== See also ==
- Polacca
- Child's War
- Chinese treasure ship
- Sloop
