= Joseph Faro =

Seventeenth century pirate

Joseph Faro (fl. 1694–1696, last name occasionally Farrell, Firra, Farrow, or Faroe) was a pirate from Newport, Rhode Island active during the Golden Age of Piracy, primarily in the Indian Ocean. He is best known for sailing alongside Thomas Tew to join Henry Every’s pirate fleet which captured and looted the fabulously rich Mughal ship Gunsway.

== History ==
In 1694 a number of Newport pirate vessels prepared to set sail with Tew, among them Joseph Bankes’ Black Barke, later renamed Portsmouth Adventure. Bankes (or Banks) transferred his commission to Joseph Faro, who captained the 90-ton 6-gun Portsmouth Adventure with a crew of 60. Among his crew was future pirate captain Dirk Chivers.

After nearly a year on voyage, in 1695 Tew, Faro, and three other captains (William Mayes, Richard Want, and Thomas Wake) joined up with Every and his ship Fancy and waited for the Mughal's treasure-laden convoy. Most of the convoy escaped, but the Gunsway and her escort Fateh Mohammed were straggling behind and after a protracted fight were overtaken and brutally looted by Every and his crew. Tew had been killed during the battle with Fateh Mohammed; Wake's slower Susannah was left behind, while Want's Dolphin was sunk and its crew transferred to Fancy. Only Faro and Mayes arrived in time to help Every, but Every denied Faro and his crew a full share of the vast riches, claiming they had never joined in the fighting.

Afterward, Faro was deposed as Captain by his crew and replaced with Want, who took Portsmouth Adventure into the Persian Gulf, and then back to Madagascar, where the ship was wrecked on Mayotte. Every rescued Faro and some of his crew en route to the Bahamas; some of Faro's crew joined Every, and a few even made it back to Newport, while Chivers and others remained behind to be later rescued by Robert Glover in the Resolution. Faro later captained the sloop Seaflower which transported Every back to Ireland when the latter chose to retire.

== See also ==
- Pirate Round, the route from the American east coast, around Africa, and into the Indian Ocean via Madagascar.
