= Fancy (pirate ship) =

1690s pirate ship

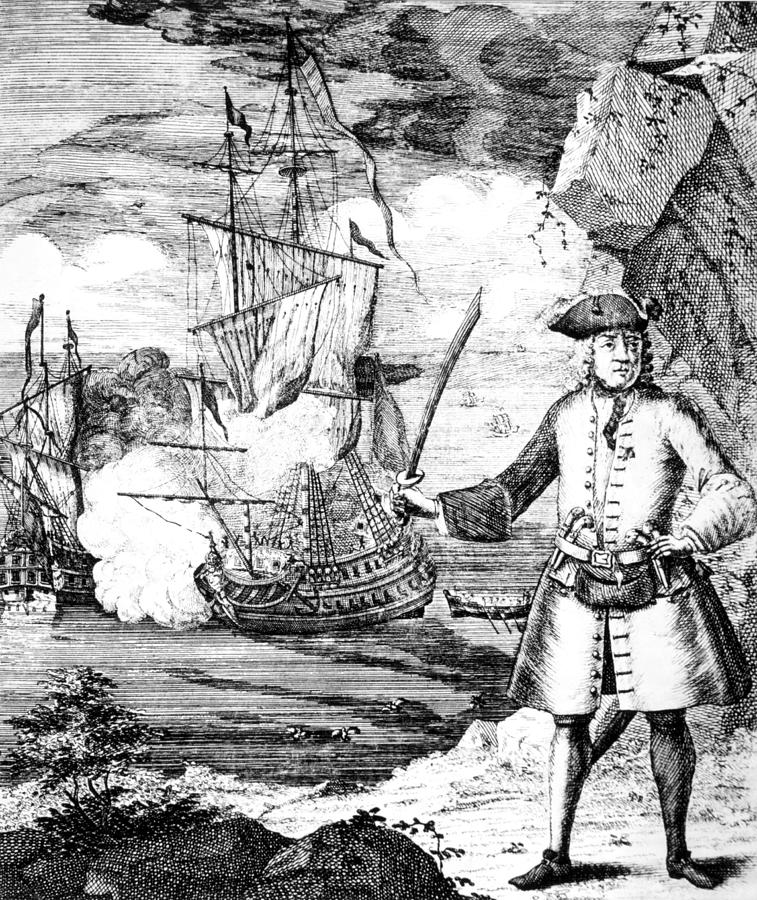
- A contemporary image of the Fancy (shown in background) attacking Every's prey

Spanish Empire
- Name: Charles II
- Namesake: Charles II of Spain
- Renamed: renamed to Fancy on May 7 1694

Pirates
- Name: Fancy
- Fate: May have ceased to be a pirate ship in 1695

General characteristics
- Class & type: Man-of-war
- Complement: 150
- Armament: 46 guns

Fancy was a 46-gun frigate commanded by pirate Henry Every between May 1694 to late 1695.

== History ==
Fancy was initially a 46-gun privateer named Charles II – after Charles II of Spain – in Spanish service, commanded by a Captain Gibson, and was anchored at A Coruña, Spain. On 7 May 1694, Henry Every and a few other conspirators organised and carried out a successful mutiny and, setting Captain Gibson ashore, left A Coruña for the Cape of Good Hope. At this time, Charles II was renamed Fancy.

Upon arriving at the Cape, Every sailed to the island of Johanna (Anjouan) in the Comoros Islands, where he had Fancy careened, removing barnacles and weed from the section of the hull that was permanently below water, increasing her speed. He also had Fancy razeed, intentionally removing parts of the ship's superstructure in order to increase her speed. Following this work, Fancy became one of the fastest ships active in the Indian Ocean, and Every used this speed to attack and take a French pirate ship, looting the vessel and recruiting approximately 40 of the crew to his own ship, leaving him with a total complement of around 150.

Every continued to be active in the Indian Ocean, where he worked alongside other famous pirates of his time, including Thomas Tew. Most notable in his captures was Ganj-i-Sawai, a Mughal ship under the command of Ibrahim Khan during Emperor Aurangzeb's era. Since Ganj-i-Sawai mounted 62 cannons and had four to five hundred musket-armed guards, cannon fire from Fancy was instrumental in Every's victory – the first salvo caused a cannon aboard Ganj-I-Siwai to explode, killing a number of gunners. Every's career ended when the crew returned to Nassau in April 1696, in the Bahamas. He returned to Britain aboard the sloop Sea Flower, arriving in Ireland in June 1696 and promptly disappearing.

Although the fate of Fancy is unknown, it was rumored that Every gave her to the governor of Nassau as a bribe. There is supporting documentary evidence that Fancy ran aground on New Providence and Governor Trott had the guns and everything of value stripped.

== Sources ==
- FOX, E.T., King of the Pirates: The Swashbuckling Life of Henry Every, The History press, Stroud, Glos. 2008, ISBN 978-0-7524-4718-6
