= Richard Want =

Pirate (fl. 1692–1696)

Richard Want (fl. 1692–1696) (Note: First name occasionally given as William. He should not be confused with William Wanton, who was involved with privateering in the New England area at the same time, and who would later go on to be Governor of Rhode Island.) was a pirate active in the Indian Ocean. He is best known for sailing alongside Thomas Tew and Henry Avery.

== History ==
Thomas Tew's first voyage from Rhode Island, around the Cape of Good Hope, and into the Indian Ocean to plunder Moorish ships using Madagascar as a staging base was wildly successful. Want had been Tew's first mate aboard the Amity for that 1692 cruise. Want had previously been a buccaneer, serving with George Raynor aboard the Batchelor's Delight when Raynor returned to Charles Town in the Province of South Carolina. Like Raynor, Want had married and settled down in South Carolina but had roots in New England.

Tew's crew convinced him to go back for a second cruise to try repeating his prior success. This time Want took command of his own 6-gun 60-man Spanish brigantine named Dolphin, fitted out in Philadelphia, and he obtained a privateering commission from the governor to cover his activities. In 1694 Tew and Want sailed out alongside another Providence companion, Joseph Faro in the Portsmouth Adventure.

Once the group arrived near Mocha in 1695, they were joined by Thomas Wake and William May, where they also met Henry Avery. They waited for the Mughal Empire's treasure-laden convoy to pass; most of the Mughal ships slipped by in the night but the pirates caught two stragglers. Tew's Amity sailed ahead to attack the smaller Fateh Mohammed but a cannon shot killed Tew early in the battle. Once the others defeated and looted Fateh Mohammed, they turned on the larger Gunsway, a personal treasure ship of Emperor Aurangzeb. Tew's Amity under ship's master John Ireland sailed back to Adam Baldridge's pirate trading post near Madagascar. Wake's Susannah was too slow and missed the battle. Want's Dolphin proved slow and unseaworthy - "an ill sayler" - and was abandoned. Avery took its crew aboard his ship Fancy and burned the empty Dolphin. Faro and Avery caught the Gunsway, with May's Pearl in tow, though Faro never engaged them. Want's crew served alongside Avery's during the battle and received the same shares of Gunsway's immense treasure.

Want remained aboard Avery's Fancy, making his way through the Persian Gulf then back to South Carolina via the Bahamas. Records indicate he had another privateering commission in 1696, this time from South Carolina.

== See also ==
- Pirate Round – later name for the route Tew and others took from New England, around southern Africa, and into the Indian Ocean via Madagascar
