= Alexander Hamilton (Bombay Marine officer) =

Sea captain, privateer and merchant

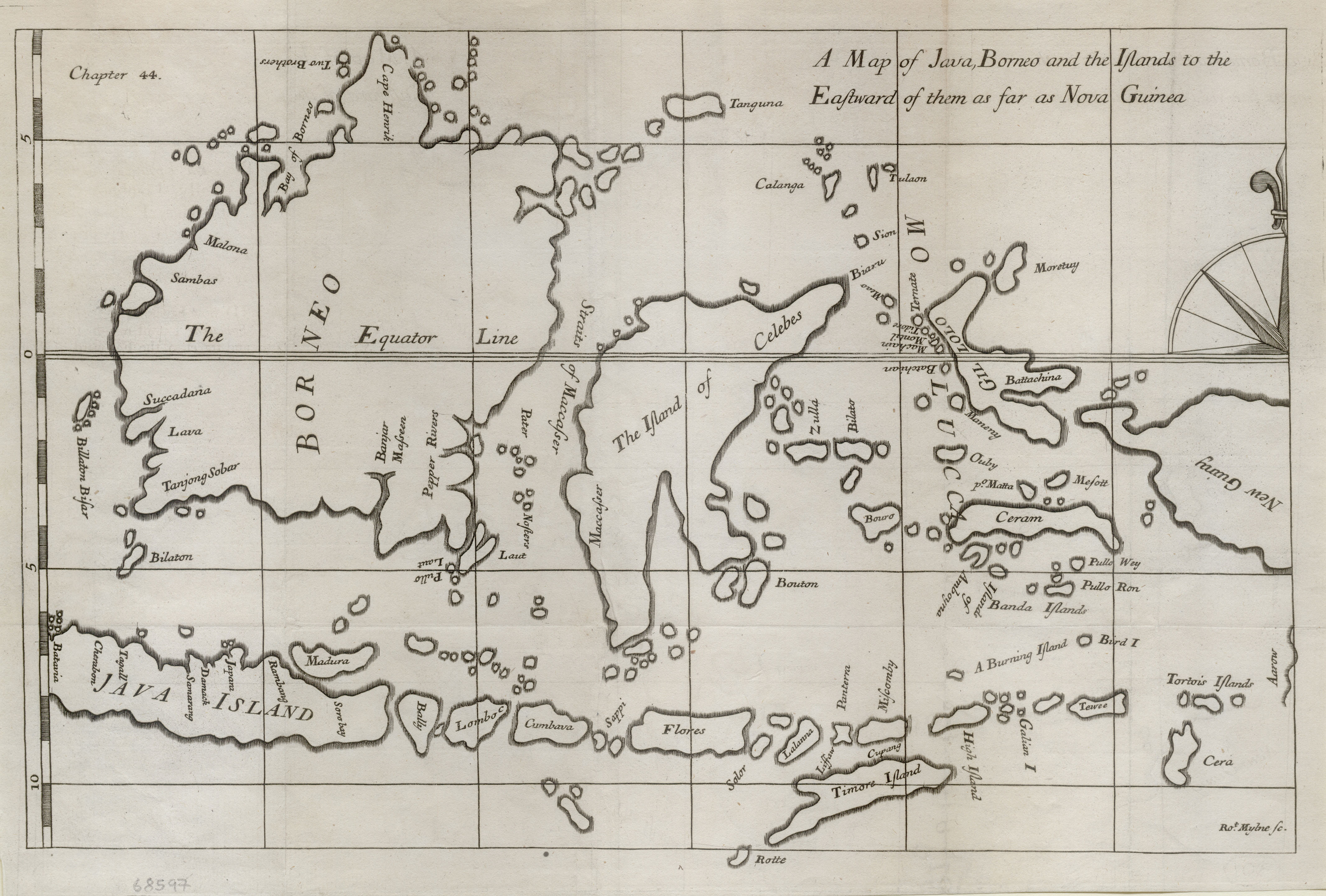
Map of the East Indies from Capt. Alexander Hamilton's 1744 edition of New account of the East Indies

Alexander Hamilton (before 1688 – after 1733) was an East India Company officer, captain, privateer and merchant.

== Biography ==
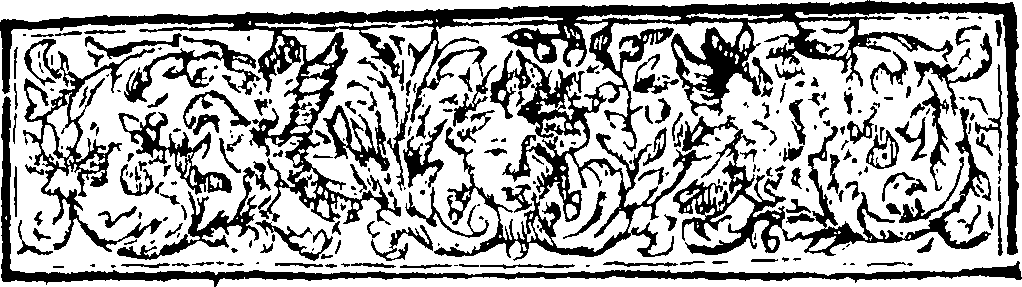
Fleurons from Hamilton's book

In his early years he travelled widely through Europe, the Barbary coast, the West Indies, India and Southeast Asia. On his arrival in Bombay in 1688 he was briefly pressed into the employ of the East India Company in a local war, and then set up as a private country trader, operating from Surat, India.

He was appointed commander of the Bombay Marine in June 1717, in which post he suppressed piracy. In 1718, he visited the Ayutthaya Kingdom and his account of his visit there survives.

The main extant source of information on Hamilton is his own book, A New Account of the East Indies (1727). The term 'East Indies' then covered a much wider geographic area than it does today – 'most of the countries and islands of commerce and navigation, between the Cape of Good Hope and the island of Japan'. Illustrated with lively anecdotes, it provides a valuable insight into British involvement in and perception of early modern Asia.

Confusingly, he used the English name Canton to refer to both the walled city (Guangzhou) and the province (Guangdong), but used Canton more often for the city and Quantung occasionally for the province.
