= Interloper (business) =

An outsider who breaks into a market where they are not authorized or welcome to trade

Interlopers are individuals or businesses who breach the monopoly of established guild, livery company, or other body granted monopoly trading rights.

== Interlopers in the English East India trade ==
The term was used for English merchants who breached the monopoly held by the English East India Company (EIC) over trade between England and the East Indies. This monopoly forbade English merchants or vessels to trade anywhere from the Cape of Good Hope to Cape Horn without a license from the EIC.

=== Madagascar slave trade 1670-1700 ===
The Madagascar slave trade was part of the Atlantic slave trade, however as it entailed sailing to the east of the Cape of Good Hope, merchants engaging in this trade were generally interlopers. Evidence of this trade dates back to the 1670s. However, despite being able to take a lawsuit against such interlopers, the EIC were indifferent to their activity. However, the Royal Africa Company (RAC), founded 1660, held a monopoly on trade between England and the west coast of Africa. This was the principal trading organisation involved with the English transatlantic slave trade. They were concerned that the interlopers were trading enslaved Malagasy people, whom they had bought at a cost of 10 shillings, compared to the cost of about £3-4 encountered by the RAC per enslaved African on the West coast of Africa. However, when the RAC entreated the EIC to take action against the interlopers, no action was in fact taken. In the English colonies in the Americas, the instructions to governors only obliged them to enforce parliamentary legislation and royal proclamations, whereas the monopolies were only laid out in royal charters; thus, they took no action.

However, in the 1690s a number of pirates had settled in Île Sainte-Marie, an island off the east coast of Madagascar. From here they raided shipping lanes in the Red Sea and Indian Ocean. Such interlopers as the New York merchant, Frederick Philipse and Stephen Delancey, began trading with the pirates selling them such goods as food, drink, guns and ammunition as well as catechisms and bibles. In return they received bullion, East India goods and slaves. Frederick's son Adolphus Philipse also participated in this trade, and they were all protected by Benjamin Fletcher, colonial governor of New York.
