= Douglas Burgess =

American historian

- Born: June 17, 1977 (age 49); Norwalk, Connecticut, U.S.
- Education: Moses Brown School; McGill University (BA); Cornell University (JD); University of British Columbia (LLM)
- Occupations: Author; historian

Douglas Burgess (born June 17, 1977) is an American author and historian specializing in maritime and legal history. He is credited as the first scholar to suggest a link between the definitions of piracy and terrorism in law. He is a featured blogger for The Huffington Post and is currently a professor of history in Yeshiva University and affiliated professor at Benjamin N Cardozo School of Law.

== Early life and education ==
Burgess was born in Norwalk, Connecticut, United States. After moving to Rhode Island, where his paternal family has lived for over three hundred years, he received his first education from the Quaker Friends at Moses Brown School. Burgess received a BA from McGill University in 1999, a JD from Cornell University in 2002, an LL.M. from the University of British Columbia in 2003, and a Ph.D. from Brown University in 2009.

== Piracy and terrorism ==
In 2003, Burgess wrote a dissertation arguing for the legal linkages between piracy and terrorism, and for the possible use of piracy law as a foundation for defining international terrorist organizations. This concept was later articulated in articles for Legal Affairs Magazine, the National Security Law Report, The New York Times , and other publications. It appeared in book form as "The World For Ransom" (2010). Burgess continues to lecture around the world on counter-terrorism and the law.

Other published books include "The Pirates' Pact" (2005) and "Seize the Trident" (2003). Burgess has authored numerous articles for trade and scholarly journals, and one piece of fiction—a mystery set in Little Compton, Rhode Island. He is a featured blogger for The Huffington Post.

== Publications ==
- Fogland Point (Poisoned Pen Press, 2018)
- "Engines of Empire: Steamships and the Victorian Imagination" (Stanford University Press, 2016).
- Night's Colony (Curiosity Quills Press, 2015)
- The Hidden History of Crime, Corruption and States, ed. Renate Bridenthal (Berghahn Books, 2012)
- "The World for Ransom: Piracy is Terrorism, Terrorism is Piracy"(Prometheus Books, 2010).
- "The Pirates' Pact: The Secret Alliances Between History's Most Notorious Buccaneers and Colonial America"(McGraw-Hill, 2008).
- "Seize the Trident: The Race for Superliner Supremacy and How It Altered the Great War"(McGraw-Hill, 2005).
