= Libertalia =

Purported pirate colony

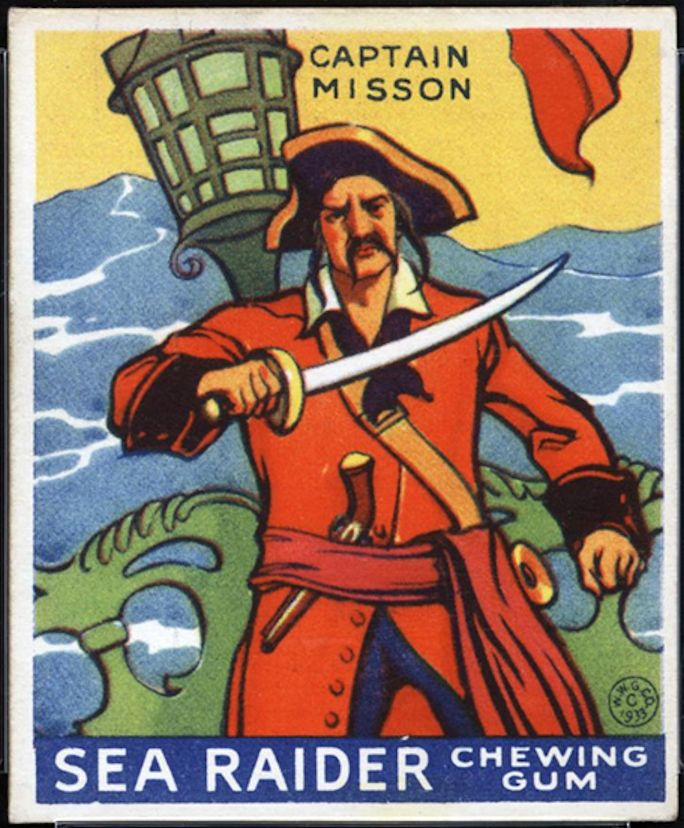
Captain Misson, described by Johnson as founder of Libertalia

Libertalia (also known as Libertatia) was a purported pirate colony founded in the late 17th century in Madagascar under the leadership of Captain James Misson (last name occasionally spelled "Mission", first name occasionally given as "Olivier"). The main source for Libertalia is Volume 2 of A General History of the Pyrates, a 1724 book which describes Captain Misson and Libertalia. Little to no corroborating evidence for Libertalia beyond this account has been found, and Libertalia is widely regarded as fictional by contemporary scholars.

== Background ==
Libertalia was a legendary free colony founded by pirates led by Captain Misson, although most historians have expressed doubts over its existence outside of literature. Libertalia got its name from the Latin word liberum which means "free". Misson's idea was to have his society be one in which people of all colours, creeds, and beliefs were to be free of any scrutiny. He wanted to give the people of Libertalia their own demonym, not one of a past country of origin. Historian and far-left activist Marcus Rediker claims:

These pirates who settled in Libertalia would be "vigilant Guardians of the People's Rights and Liberties"; they would stand as "Barriers against the Rich and Powerful" of their day. By waging war on behalf of "the Oppressed" against the "Oppressors," they would see that "Justice was equally distributed."

Like some historically documented pirates, they practiced direct democracy, where the people as a whole held the authority to make laws and rules, and also used systems of councils composed of delegates who were supposed to think of themselves as "comrades" of the general population, not rulers. They created a new language for their colony and operated a socialist economy.

The pirate utopia's motto was "for God and liberty," and its flag was white, in contrast to a Jolly Roger.

== Captain James Misson ==
According to the account in A General History of the Pyrates, Misson was French, born in Provence, and it was while he was in Rome on leave from the French warship Victoire that he lost his faith, disgusted by the decadence of the Papal Court. In Rome he ran into Caraccioli – a "lewd Priest" who over the course of long voyages with little to do but talk, gradually converted Misson and a sizeable portion of the rest of the crew to his way of thinking:

he fell upon Government, and shew'd, that every Man was born free, and had as much Right to what would support him, as to the Air he respired... that the vast Difference betwixt Man and Man, the one wallowing in Luxury, and the other in the most pinching Necessity, was owing only to Avarice and Ambition on the one Hand, and a pusillanimous Subjection on the other.

Embarking on a career of piracy, the 200 strong crew of the Victoire called upon Misson to be their captain. They shared the wealth of the ship, deciding "all should be in common."

== Location ==
The consensus of modern scholarship is that Libertalia (or Libertatia) was not a real place, but a work of fiction. Journalist Kevin Rushby toured the area seeking descendants of pirate inhabitants without success, claiming “others have tried and failed many times”, although the Betsimisaraka have historically claimed descent from pirates. There were pirate settlements on and around Madagascar, on which Libertalia may have been based: Abraham Samuel at Fort Dauphin, Adam Baldridge at Ile Ste.-Marie, and James Plaintain at Rantabe were all ex-pirates who founded trading posts and towns. These locations appear frequently in official accounts and letters from the period, while Libertalia appears only in Johnson's General History, Volume 2. Johnson writes about the overall set up of Libertalia. The settlement was purported to have an elevated fort on each side of the harbor with 40 guns in each fort, from the Portuguese. Below the fort, under the protection of the forts, was where the living quarters along with the rest of the town was located. Libertalia was located roughly 13 miles east-south-east of the nearest town.

== Criticism ==
Johnson's "Libertalia" has been treated as completely fictional, as apocryphal, or as a utopian commentary. The inclusion of fictional accounts such as Misson's in A General History has caused some modern scholars to discount the entire work as a reliable source, though other portions of it have been at least partially corroborated by various sources. The Oxford Research Encyclopedia of African History describes Libertalia as "fictitious".

== Libertalia in popular culture ==
=== Literature ===
- William S. Burroughs
  - Cities of the Red Night, 1981
  - Ghost of Chance, 1991
- Daniel Vaxelaire. Les mutins de la liberté, 1986
- Johnson, Charles. A General History of the Pyrates, 1724 (in Volume 2)
- Libertalia, une utopie pirate (French extract of "Histoire générale des plus fameux pirates"), L'Esprit Frappeur
- Marcus Rediker. "Libertalia: The Pirate's Utopia," in Pirates: Terror on the High Seas from the Caribbean to the South China Sea
- Peter Lamborn Wilson. Pirate Utopias: Moorish Corsairs & European Renegadoes, 1995
- Pirates of the Caribbean: Legends of the Brethren Court: Wild Waters, 2009
- Rushby, Kevin. Hunting Pirate Heaven, 2001
- W. E. Johns. Biggles and the Pirate Treasure, 1954
- Tubella Casadevall, Imma. Els insubmisos del mar, 2021
- Langrehr, Rick. Libertalia: Stealing Equality, 2022
- David Graeber. Pirate Enlightenment, or the real Libertalia, 2023

=== Museum ===
- Pirates Museum in Antananarivo, since 2008
- Ilot Madame Museum

=== Film ===
- Against All Flags (1952)
- The Amorous Corporal (1958)
- The King's Pirate (1967)
- The Grand Tour (2020)

=== Video games ===
- Assassin's Creed IV: Black Flag (2013) (mentioned only)
- Europa Universalis IV (2013)
- Fallout 4 (2015) (has a floating settlement of bandits named "Libertalia")
- Uncharted 4: A Thief's End (2016) (altered interpretation in which the colony was founded by Henry Avery and Thomas Tew among other famous pirates.)

=== Music ===
- Ye Banished Privateers: The Legend of Libertalia (album, 2014)
- Jake and the Infernal Machine: Libertalia (album, 2014)
- Ja, Panik: Libertatia (album, 2014)
- FreibeuterAG: "Libertalia" (song)
- Running Wild: "Libertalia" (song), a bonus track from their album Rogues en Vogue (2005).
- Yuna Palatine: "Libertatia" (song)
- Ye Banished Privateers:" Bring Out Your Dead - The Legend of Libertalia" (song)
- Arc De Soleil, Libertalia' (EP 2020)

== See also ==
- Distribution of justice
- Republic of Pirates
