= Bety of Betsimisaraka =

18th century queen of Betsimisaraka, ceded Ile Sainte-Marie to France

Marie Elisabeth "Bety" Sobobie of Betsimisaraka or Betia (c. 1735–1805), was queen regnant of the kingdom of Betsimisaraka, consisting of the island Île Sainte-Marie and parts of eastern Madagascar, from 1750 to 1754 (Île Sainte-Marie) and 1762 (Eastern Madagascar). She famously ceded the Île Sainte-Marie to France in 1750.

== Life ==
Bety was the daughter of king Ratsimilaho of Betsimisaraka (also known as Tom Smilo) and the Sakalava princess Mamadion of Boina. She was the paternal granddaughter of a British or American pirate by the name Thomas (Thomas Tew, Thomas White or Thomas Collins), and queen Antavaratra Rahena of Zana Malata.

The Île Sainte Marie was at this time inhabited by the Zana Malata, which was a mixture of the local inhabitants and the Western pirates who had used the island as a base since the 1680s. The father of Bety united the island to one kingdom and also conquered a part of the Eastern coast of Malagasy, and gave the kingdom the name Betsimisaraka. Bety succeeded her father upon his death, and on 30 July that year, she fulfilled his wish by placing it under the protection of the French East India Company on a ceremony on the ship Mars, with the support of 60 local chiefs and in the presence of representatives of the French governor of Isle de France (Mauritius).

Queen Bety formally continued to rule the island as a French protectorate. Upon her accession to the throne, she had a permanent love relationship with the Frenchman Jean Onésime Filet (d. 1767), who became her prince consort. In September 1751, a rebellion broke out on Île Sainte-Marie where the French were massacred. Bety and her mother traveled to Île de France were they successfully convinced the French governor of their innocence. She spent the following five years at Île de France. In 1756, she left for her remaining kingdom at the East coast of Madagascar, which she ruled for six years. In 1762, she seeded Foulpointe, to her half brother Jean Hare, which is regarded as the de facto end point of the kingdom of Betsimisaraka, though some smaller provinces nominally remained under her control.

Queen Bety settled permanently at Isle de France (Mauritius), where she was a major landowner. She was described as a warm-hearted beauty and enjoyed respect among the French. Upon her death in 1805, in Vacoas (Mauritius), she left the remains of nominal kingdom to her nephew Iavy, but in practice, Betsimisaraka no longer existed and the remains were under French control.
