= Mimapomecyna biplagiatipennis =

Scientific classification
- Kingdom: Animalia
- Phylum: Arthropoda
- Class: Insecta
- Order: Coleoptera
- Suborder: Polyphaga
- Infraorder: Cucujiformia
- Family: Cerambycidae
- Genus: Mimapomecyna
- Species: M. biplagiatipennis

Binomial name
- Mimapomecyna biplagiatipennis Breuning, 1961

Species of beetle

Mimapomecyna biplagiatipennis is a species of beetle in the family Cerambycidae. It was described by Stephan von Breuning in 1961. It is known from Madagascar, including Nosy Boraha.

Mimapomecyna biplagiatipennis measure 9.5 mm (0.37 in) in length.
