= Pirate haven =

Settlement or port occupied by pirates

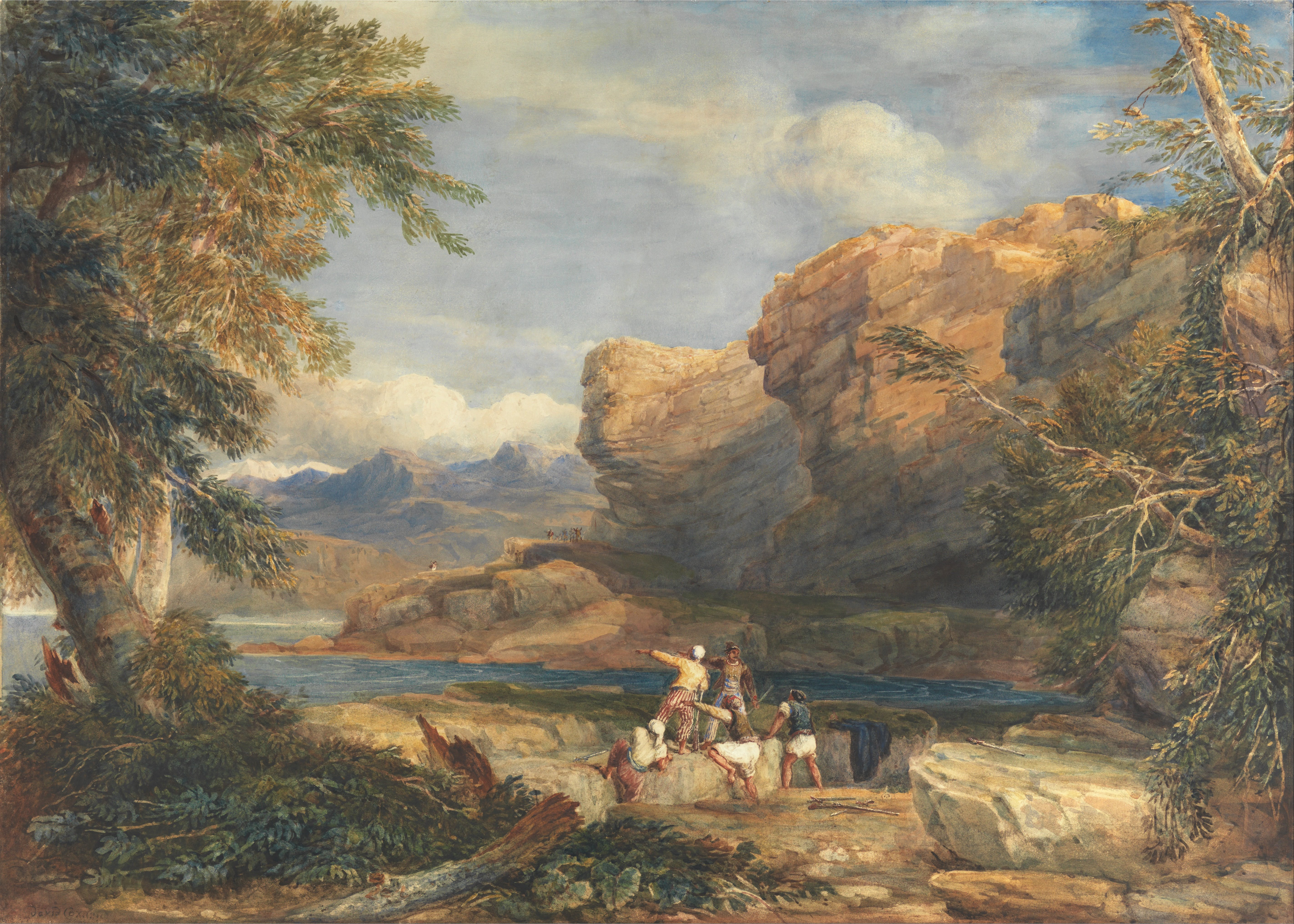
Pirate's Isle, a watercolor painting by David Cox

Pirate havens or Pirate coves are ports or harbors that are a safe place for pirates to repair their vessels, resupply, recruit, spend their plunder, avoid capture, and/or lie in wait for merchant ships to pass by. The areas have governments that are unable or unwilling to enforce maritime laws. This creates favorable conditions for piracy. Pirate havens were places where pirates could find shelter, protection, support, and trade.

These havens were often near maritime shipping lanes. Although some havens were merely hidden coves, some were established by governments who employed privateers to disrupt the overseas trade of rival nations. Some of the most famous island strongholds included Tortuga in the Caribbean, Madagascar in the Indian Ocean, and the Sulu Archipelago in the Sulu Sea.

Some historic pirate havens included Barataria Bay, Port Royal, and Tortuga. These provided some autonomy for privateers and buccaneers.

== Impact ==
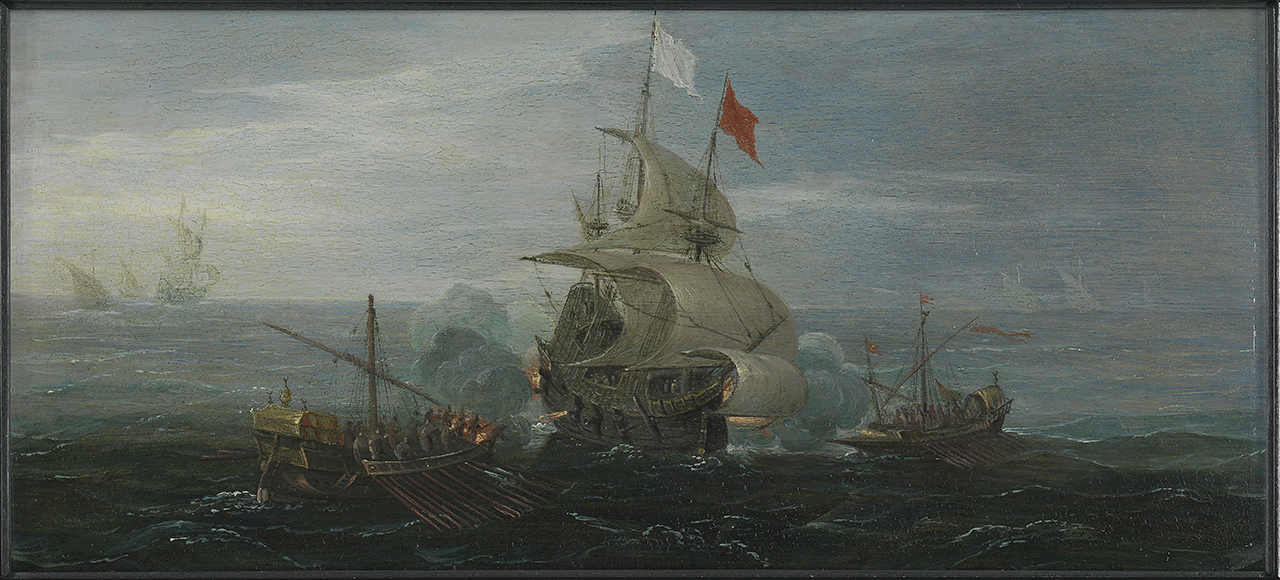
French trading ship attacked by pirates during the Golden Age of Piracy

Pirate havens enabled pirates to launch frequent and effective attacks on merchant ships that carried valuable goods across the oceans. This caused losses and damages to traders and shippers who had to pay higher insurance premiums or avoid certain routes or regions altogether. One of the major effects of pirates disrupted trade and commerce by attacking and capturing merchant vessels of all nations. They interfered with the flow of goods and people across the Atlantic, connecting Europe, Africa, and the Americas. Pirates targeted valuable cargoes such as sugar, tobacco, spices, textiles, slaves, and gold. They also seized ships and equipment maritime navigation and communication.

Pirate havens influenced the relations and conflicts among various colonial powers, who competed for control over trade and territory in different parts of the world. Some pirate havens served as allies or enemies to certain nations, depending on their interests or alliances. Some pirate havens also challenged the authority and legitimacy of established governments by asserting their own sovereignty or autonomy.

Dealers who had set up their business in various locations in the Caribbean and the Indian Ocean purchased goods from pirates. They paid a lower price for these goods than they would have paid to merchant ships in any other port, and the pirates accepted their money, even if they sold at a lower price than the value. The dealers then transported their goods to ports where they sold them through the same channels that they would have followed if the trade process had not been interrupted by the pirates. This created competition and influenced the market prices of many products.

Some colonial officials cooperated with pirates and offered them better prices for their loot than they could get in a safe port. One of the most well-known of these officials was Charles Eden, the governor of North Carolina, who granted pardons to famous pirates like Edward Teach (also known as Blackbeard) and Stede Bonnet. He even let Teach set up a pirate base at Ocracoke Island. This cooperation weakened the authority and legitimacy of colonial governments and increased piracy.

== Barbary Coast ==
Historically, the Barbary Coast contained a number of pirate havens, notably Salé, Algiers, and Tunis. These pirate havens were used by corsairs from the 16th to the 19th century. The pirates ravaged European shipping and enslaved thousands of captives. The Pirate Republic of Salé, in 17th century Morocco, was a micronation with its own seaport argot known as "Franco", since like other pirate states, it from time to time made treaties with European governments, agreeing not to attack their fleets.

Mehdya (La Mamora) in Morocco was a pirate haven in the early 17th century. Another notable base for Barbary corsairs was Ghar al Milh (Porto Farina) in Tunisia.

The United States Navy was founded, in part, to counter the activities of the Barbary pirates, and the United States fought the First and Second Barbary Wars (1801–1805, 1815) to end this threat to its shipping.

== Ireland ==
In the early 17th century in Munster (Ireland's southernmost province), Leamcon (near Schull) was a pirate stronghold, while pirates traded easily in nearby Baltimore and Whiddy Island. Munster's coast provided favorable geography in the form of harbors, bays, islands, anchorages and headlands, while the province's remoteness made it difficult to control from London or Dublin. Literate pirates in Ireland could, till 1613, escape secular trial (making their prosecution much more difficult) by pleading "benefit of clergy". The coast of Munster complemented Mehdya as a base for piracy since, during summers, Mehdya became less safe as the calmer waters favored the galleys used to suppress piracy.

== Madagascar ==
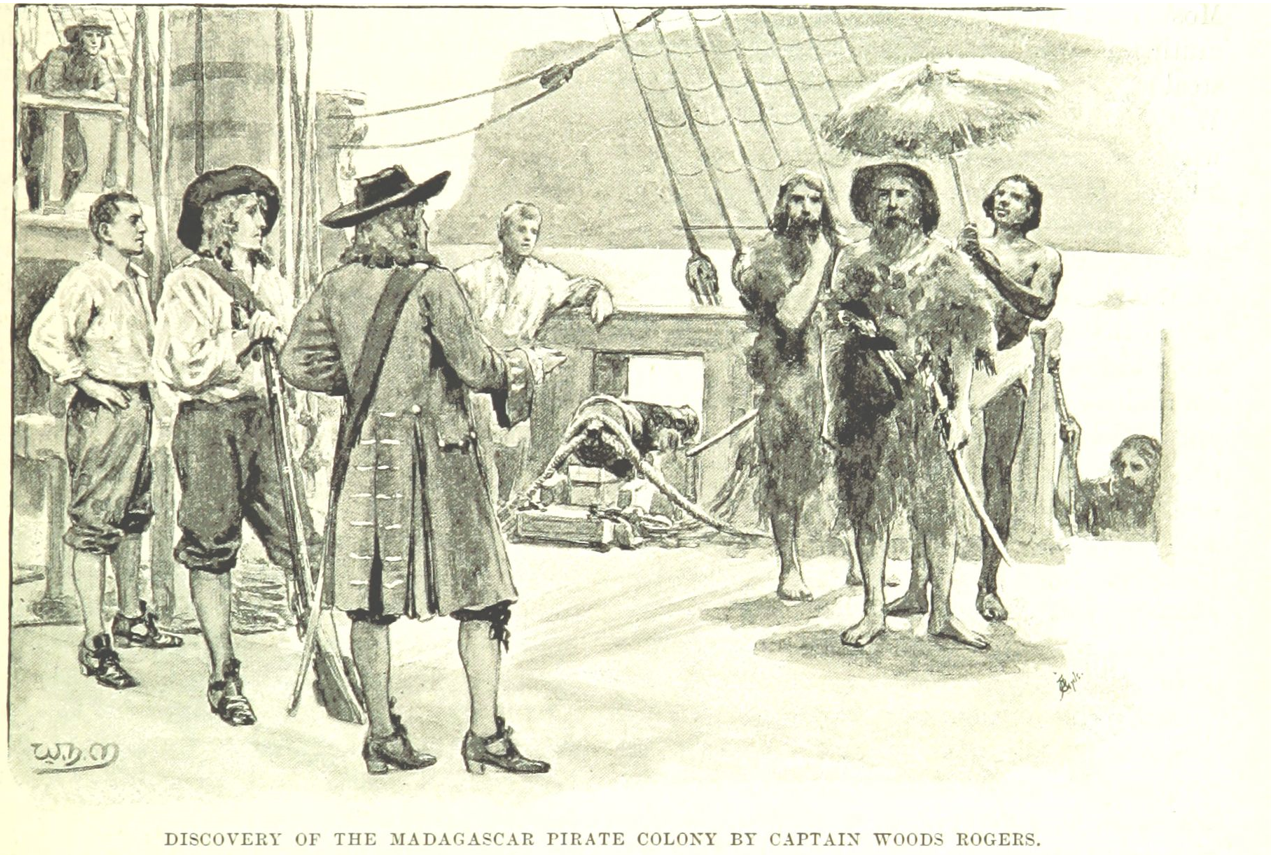
"Discovery of the Madagascar pirate colony by Captain Woods Rogers", from 1892 book The Story of Africa and its Explorers

One of the earliest rumored places where pirates collected was on the island of Madagascar, off the east coast of Africa. This was their base of operations for their pecking of the Mughal Empire. Here they could prey on the successes of the East India Companies while being a world away from any authority. These are the same outlaws that were plundering the West Indies. The English pirate Henry Every plundered a Mughal ship, gaining immense wealth. Every was said to have settled on Madagascar and was never heard from again, though it was rumored he retired in Ireland. Some writers speculate that this event put in motion a series of events that would help lead to the multitude of laws passed for decades to come.

Madagascar was an island off the coast of Africa that became a refuge for pirates who operated in the Indian Ocean in the late 17th and early 18th centuries. It was a place where pirates could find abundant food, water, wood, and slaves. It was also a place where pirates could establish their own settlements and communities, such as Libertatia.

Madagascan pirate havens included Fort-Dauphin, the town of Saint Augustin, and Sainte-Marie.

A Madagascan pirate colony was established by a group of English and French pirates who sailed to the island in 1698 under the command of Captain William Kidd. They settled on the east coast of Madagascar, near Sainte-Marie. They built a fort and a town, and traded with the local Malagasy people. They also raided ships that passed by the island, and amassed a large amount of treasure. The colony lasted for about 25 years, until it was destroyed by a French expedition in 1723.

== Bahamas ==
New Providence was an island in the Bahamas that became a base for pirates who operated in the Atlantic Ocean in the early 18th century. It was a place where pirates could find friendly merchants, governors, and judges who were willing to trade with them or protect them from prosecution. It was also a place where pirates could form alliances and associations, such as the Flying Gang.

== Somali Coast ==
In the early 2000s, piracy off the coast of Somalia became commonplace. During this period, pirate havens included Eyl, in the Puntland region of northern Somalia, and Harardhere (Xarard-heere), in the Mudug province of Somalia. During this same time period, the Transitional Federal Government of Somalia was believed to be unable to enforce maritime laws. Other modern havens included Garaad and Hobyo in central Somalia.

== List of examples ==
- Barataria Bay in the United States
- Campeche in Mexico
- Crete in Greece
- Harardhere in Somalia
- San Andrés (Tenerife) in Spain
- Visby in Gotland, Sweden
  - See Victual Brothers

=== Caribbean ===
- Matanzas in Cuba
- Republic of Pirates (New Providence) in the Bahamas
- Port Royal in Jamaica
- Saint Thomas in the U.S. Virgin Islands
- Tortuga in Haiti
- Virgin Gorda in the British Virgin Islands

=== Purported ===
- Libertatia

== Pirate utopias ==
The American anarchist Peter Lamborn Wilson identified pirate societies as being spaces temporarily outside of the control of states, and consequently proto-anarchist societies. This forms part of his thesis of Temporary Autonomous Zones, spaces or polities in which anarchist conceptions of freedom were briefly enacted during various historical periods.

== See also ==
- Tax haven
