= Bezanozano =

Malagasy ethnic group

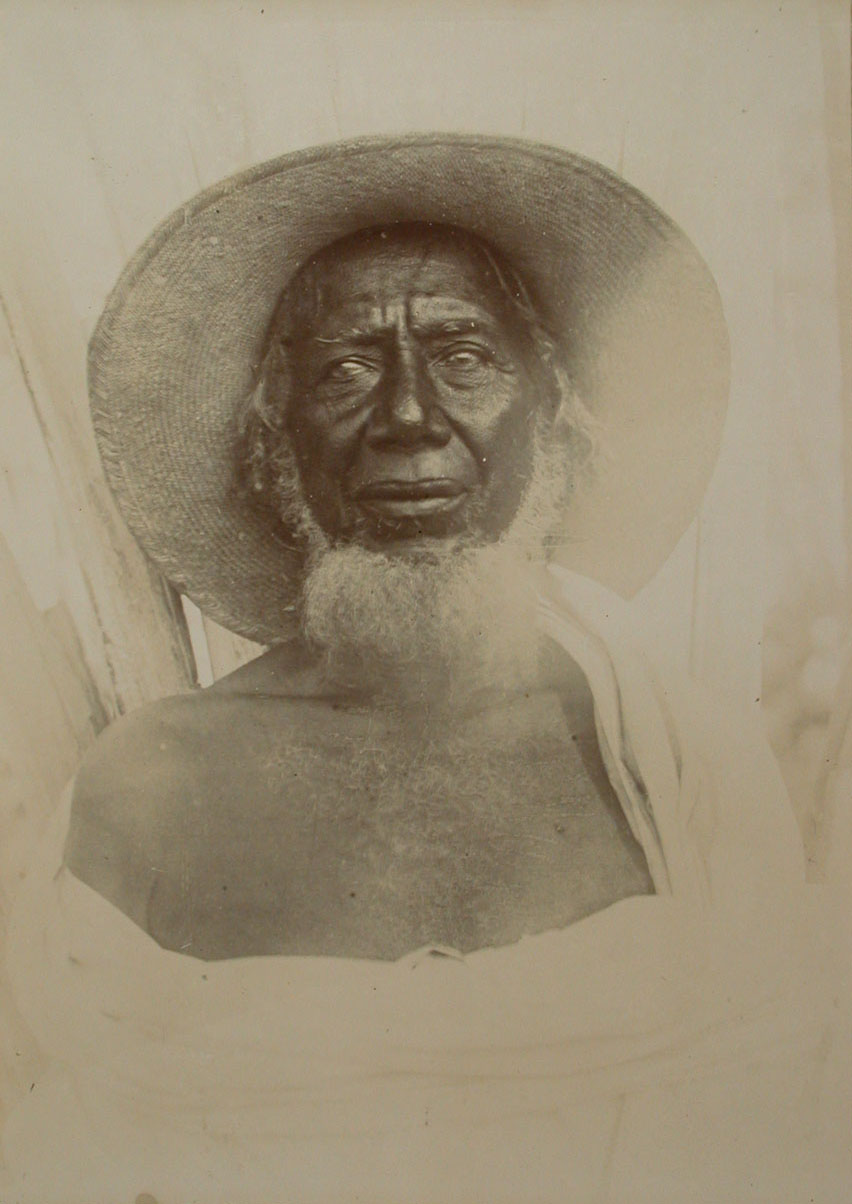

Total population
- c. 100,000

Regions with significant populations
- Madagascar

Languages
- Bezanozano

Related ethnic groups
- Other Malagasy groups; Austronesian peoples, Bantu peoples

The Bezanozano or Antankay are believed to be one of the earliest Malagasy ethnic groups to establish themselves in Madagascar, where they inhabit an inland area between the Betsimisaraka lowlands and the Merina highlands. They are associated with the vazimba, the earliest inhabitants of Madagascar, and the many vazimba tombs throughout Bezanozano territory are sites of pilgrimage, ritual and sacrifice, although the Bezanozano believe the descendants among them of these most ancient of ancestors cannot be identified or known. Their name means "those of many small plaits" in reference to their traditional hairstyle, and like the Merina they practice the famadihana reburial ceremony. There were around 100,000 Bezanozano living in Madagascar in 2013.

The slave trade and commerce with European trading vessels along the east coast of Madagascar in the 18th century greatly enriched the Bezanozano and led to the emergence of major trading towns such as Ambatondrazaka and Moramanga in their homeland of Ankay. They were initially forced into vassalage by king Andrianampoinimerina of the Kingdom of Imerina in the late 18th century and then fully subdued and colonized in 1817 by his son, King Radama I. Under Merina rule, the Bezanozano were heavily forced into unpaid labor to transport goods between the Merina capital of Antananarivo and the coastal port of Toamasina, leading to massive depopulation of the Ankay region and impoverishment of the villagers. The name Bezanozano became synonymous with "slave". Efforts to improve economic opportunities for the Bezanozano began following French colonization in 1896, and after independence in 1960 a local movement emerged to abandon notions of historic class affiliation that were holding communities back. Today agriculture remains the primary livelihood of Bezanozano villagers.

== Ethnic identity ==
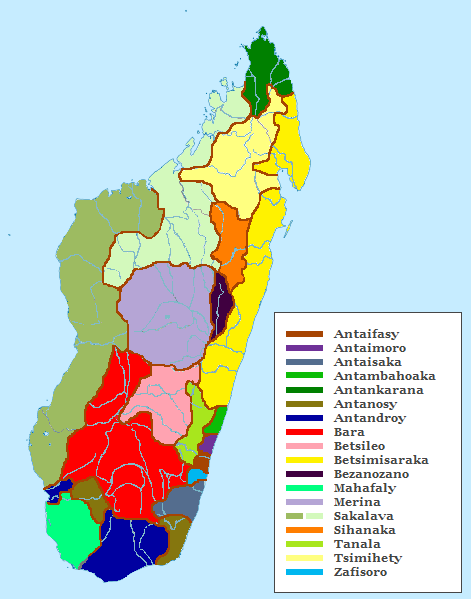
Distribution of Malagasy ethnic groups

The Bezanozano were only briefly an organized polity and do not share a strong internal cohesive identity. Their name means "those of many small plaits" in reference to their traditional hairstyle. The center of the Bezanozano community at its height in the late 18th century was the town of Ambatondrazaka. There were around 100,000 Bezanozano living in Madagascar in 2013.

== History ==
The Bezanozano inhabited the fertile forested land between the plains of Imerina to the west and the lowland coastal rainforest to the east in an area historically called Ankay. They lived in fortified villages governed by local chiefs. Their original source of unified identity was the worship of 11 protective sampy (idols) said to have been brought from Sakalava territory. According to popular belief, the Bezanozano may be descendants of the island's earliest inhabitants, the Vazimba. Oral history relates that the Bezanozano historically lived in small communities governed collectively by village elders. Matters of justice were handled collectively through public deliberation to reach consensus.

Bezanozano society reached its golden age in the 18th century, acting as intermediaries in trade between the Merina in the highlands and the European and Arab slave traders and merchants that landed along the east coast. Occasionally Bezanozano villagers would negotiate directly with French traders; some of these were captured and sold into slavery themselves. This intermediary trading role allowed the Bezanozano to amass considerable wealth in slaves and cattle. Some of this wealth was gained by engaging in slave raids in the communities in the neighboring Kingdom of Imerina, which was then in the throes of a destabilizing civil war. The town of Moramanga became a major hub of Bezanozano trade. The population of slaves owned by the Bezanozano had grown so large by the mid-18th century that in 1768 a slave rebellion erupted; the Bezanozano solicited the aid of Europeans to put it down. To further strengthen their economic position, the Bezanozano entered into an alliance with the powerful Betsimisaraka Kingdom to the east. They were in regular enough economic relations with Europeans that they were able to offer Spanish piastres in addition to slaves in exchange for the guns provided by European traders. The villages neighboring Bezanozano territory were in many instances invited to assist in transporting Bezanozano trade goods because the demand for Bezanozano services exceeded the manpower available to satisfy it. In the late 18th century the Bezanozano were spread out over a territory twice the size of the area they consider their homeland today, extending from Angavokely in the west to the Betsimisaraka cliffs to the east, and southward to around twelve kilometers beyond Beparasy. The first and only Bezanozano king, Randrianjomoina, emerged around this time.

The wealth of the region had encouraged several other kingdoms to attempt to conquer this territory, but none were successful until King Andrianampoinimerina of neighboring Imerina (d. 1810), who allowed Randrianjomoina and the Bezanozano chieftains to retain their positions but required them to pay an annual tribute to him. The Bezanozano actively resisted Andrianampoinimerina's authority throughout his reign and refused to observe mourning customs upon his death. With the death of the Merina king, other Bezanozano communities actively rebelled against the authority of the Imerina Kingdom. His son and successor, Radama I, retaliated by burning a major Bezanozano town and slaughtering its inhabitants. Radama and his army of 30,000 soldiers successfully colonized Bezanozano territory in 1817 en route to Toamasina, where he further extended his authority over the Betsimisaraka. Having established control over the Bezanozano, Radama imposed the customary fanampoana (unpaid labor in lieu of taxes) to produce high volumes of rice, cattle and other goods that were to be given to the Merina king as annual tribute. Radama I opened a major transport road from his capital at Antananarivo that ran through Bezanozano territory to the coastal port at Toamasina. His successor, Queen Ranavalona I, established a munitions factory at Mantasoa in the region and a second transport road to Toamasina, effectively bounding the southern part of Bezanozano territory between these two major trade routes. Consequently, the local population were heavily conscripted to provide unpaid labor for major public works projects like road maintenance and support to the trade caravans. The Bezanozano became so strongly associated with unpaid labor and porterage in the minds of many Merina that a stereotype formed that persists today conflating the name Bezanozano with andevo (the historic slave class). This policy had the result of strongly depopulating the Ankay. In the 1830s a Bezanozano rebellion against this forced labor disrupted trade to between the capital and the east coast until it was put down by the Merina army. The natural resources of Bezanozano territory were more systematically exploited under Merina rule, including timber and iron; iron ore was abundant in Bezanozano territory in part because the local population had never learned to smith it. Merina culture also became assimilated during the 19th century, introducing the cultivation of peanuts and beans and the construction of stone tombs and trano gasy houses.

Following the French colonization of Madagascar in 1896, other innovations from Imerina were gradually introduced, like terraced irrigated paddy fields, ox carts and the fabrication of metal tools. Large numbers of Merina migrants settled in this region beginning in the 1920s, where they worked as merchants, traders and forestry capitalists. After Madagascar regained independence in 1960, there was a strong social movement among the Bezanozano to reestablish an ethnic identity in which constraints associated with class and historic social roles were jettisoned in favor of greater freedom, opportunity and equality. Local officials of the leading political party, PSD, sought to ensure equal participation of the descendants of Bezanozano andriana (nobles) and slaves while minimizing representation of the local Merina population. Following the 1972 rotaka (protests) that brought down the Tsiranana administration and ushered in the AREMA government of Didier Ratsiraka, the central authority preferred working with the traditional community leaders, who were typically Bezanozano elders.

== Society ==
=== Family affiliation ===
Gender roles in traditional Bezanozano families are strictly defined. Men are the active participants in discussions about public affairs, and are responsible for house construction, earning money to pay for basic family needs, and preparing the paddy fields for planting. Women are responsible for weaving, tending crops, collecting water, tending the hearth and preparing meals. Similarly, women were traditionally expected to follow behind when walking with a man. Bezanozano men working as porters used to believe that if a woman passed in front of him while he worked, he would be injured the next time he attempted to carry a load.

=== Religious affiliation ===
Most Bezanozano practice the veneration of ancestors (razana), who in ritual were sometimes referred to as zanahary (gods). They recognized the existence of male and female zanahary, who were effectively the most ancient and most powerful of all the ancestors, and who were invoked anonymously and collectively under the zanahary title in order to avoid excluding and thereby offending any ancestor. The tompontany (masters of the land) are the vazimba, the island's earliest inhabitants; they are distinct from the razana in that it is believed impossible to trace the descendants of these ancestors. All ancient tombs or earthen tomb-shaped mounds are believed to be those of vazimba and so are sites of pilgrimage, sacrifice and ritual to appease their spirits and request their favorable intervention. The Bezanozano also believe in sorcery and fear witchcraft. Although Protestant missionaries and churches became established in the Ankay region particularly in the later 19th century, Merina settlers constitute the majority of Christians in the region; very few Bezanozano have converted to Protestantism.

== Culture ==
The Bezanozano cultivate rice in terraced, irrigated paddies and prefer not to cut down virgin forest, as they contain vazimba tombs and other natural sites favored by spirits and are the home of the fady-protected indri lemurs. The neighboring Betsimisaraka, however, tend to seek out new forest to cut down for fresh pasture and planting, and consider uncultivated land as unclaimed. This difference of perspective has led the Betsimisaraka to encroach on land that the Bezanozano believe belongs to them, producing some tension among bordering communities.

Indirect speech, discretion, tact and avoidance of conflict mark verbal expression and social interactions among the Bezanozano, similar to the highland Merina but in contrast with the Betsimisaraka of the east coast.

=== Fady ===
In Ambatondrazaka and among certain other Bezanozano communities, consumption of pork has historically been fady. The Indri was probably considered taboo in many Bezanozano villages, where it may not be killed or eaten, must be freed if trapped, and must be buried with the same rites as a person.

=== Funeral rites ===
The Bezanozano traditionally bury their dead in stone tombs. Like the Merina, they practice the famadihana reburial ceremony. Funerals are celebrated by drinking large quantities of rum.

=== Dance and music ===
The Betatoato is a dance that is unique to the Bezanozano.

== Language ==
The Bezanozano speak a dialect of the Malagasy language, which is a branch of the Malayo-Polynesian language group derived from the Barito languages, spoken in southern Borneo.

== Economy ==
Honey is collected from the forest and sold at market or roadside stands. Historically honey had an important role in Merina royal rituals, and the Bezanozano were considered the best honey collectors. Agriculture remains the principal livelihood for Bezanozano villagers, who grow rice, corn, beans and other staples; a practice specific to this region is vary verina, the growing of rice on a higher terrace and the growing of beans and corn on the terrace below it. The historic impact of Merina colonization of the Ankay region continues to be felt, with the majority of wealth and much of the most valuable land concentrated in the hands of Merina families.

== Bibliography ==
- Ade Ajayi, J. F. (1989). Africa in the Nineteenth Century Until the 1880s. Paris: UNESCO. ISBN 9789231017124.
- Aubert, Sigrid; Razafiarison, Serge; Bertrand, Alain (2003). Déforestation et systèmes agraires à Madagascar: les dynamiques des tavy sur la côte orientale (in French). Paris: Editions Quae. ISBN 9782915064018.
- Bradt, Hilary; Austin, Daniel (2007). Madagascar (9th ed.). Guilford, CT: The Globe Pequot Press Inc. ISBN 978-1-84162-197-5.
- Campbell, Gwyn (2012). David Griffiths and the Missionary "History of Madagascar". Leiden, The Netherlands: Brill. ISBN 9789004195189.
- Campbell, Gwyn (2005). An Economic History of Imperial Madagascar, 1750-1895: The Rise and Fall of an Island Empire. Cambridge, MA: Cambridge University Press. ISBN 9780521839358.
- Diagram Group (2013). Encyclopedia of African Peoples. San Francisco, CA: Routledge. ISBN 9781135963415.
- Gennep, A.V. (1904). Tabou Et Totémisme à Madagascar (in French). Paris: Ernest Leroux. ISBN 978-5-87839-721-6.
- Ogot, Bethwell A. (1992). Africa from the Sixteenth to the Eighteenth Century. Paris: UNESCO. ISBN 9789231017117.
- Rahamefy, Adolphe (2007). Sectes et crises religieuses à Madagascar (in French). Paris: Karthala Editions. ISBN 9782845868571.
- Raison-Jourde, Françoise (1991). Bible et pouvoir à Madagascar au XIXe siècle (in French). Paris: Karthala Editions. ISBN 9782865373178.
- Rakoto, Ignace; Urfer, Sylvain (2014). Esclavage et libération à Madagascar (in French). Paris: Karthala Editions. ISBN 9782811111335.
