= Île aux Nattes =

Island in Analanjirofo, Madagascar

Nosy Nato (Ile aux Nattes)
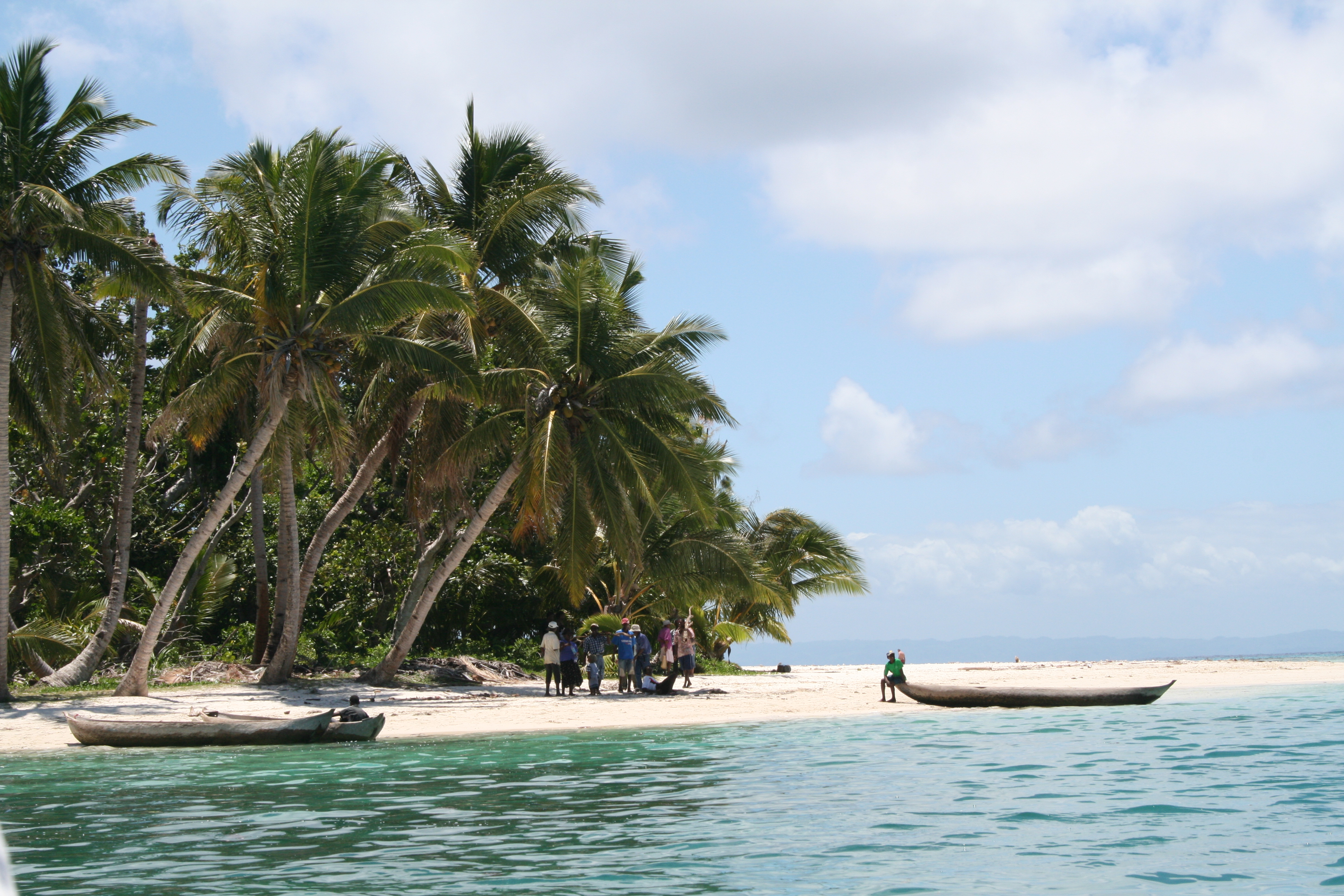
- Iles aux Nattes, Madagascar

- Location within Madagascar

Geography
- Location: Analanjirofo, Madagascar
- Coordinates: 17°07′S 49°49′E
- Archipelago: Ile Sainte Marie
- Total islands: 2
- Area: 3 km^{2} (1.2 sq mi)

Administration
- Madagascar

Demographics
- Population: ~200-300

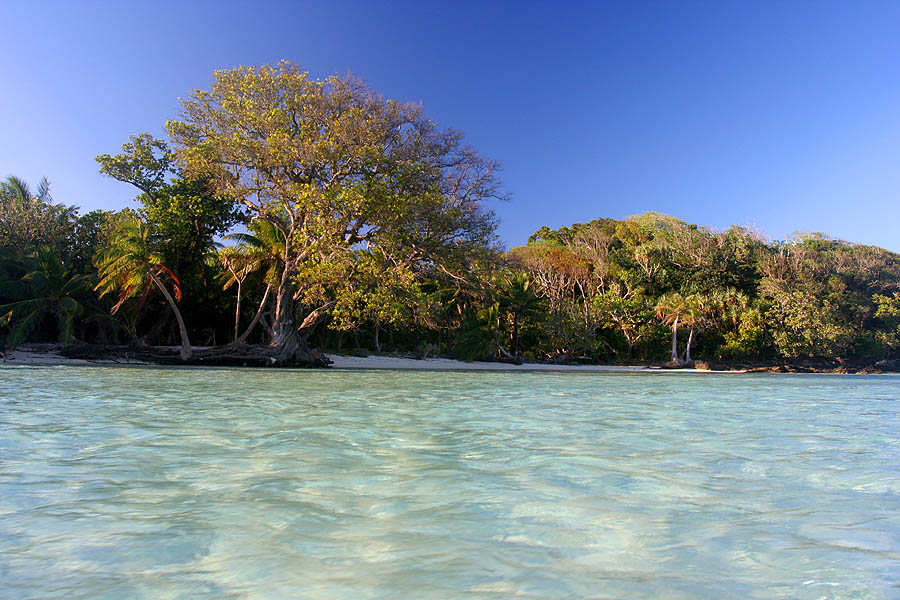
The beach at the southeast side of Île aux Nattes (Nosy Nato).

Île aux Nattes (also officially, but less commonly, called Nosy Nato) is a small island south of Île Sainte-Marie, an island off the east coast of Madagascar. Both belong to the region of Analanjirofo, in the Toamasina Province.

The archipelago of Sainte Marie is constituted by seven islands: The main island is Ile Sainte Marie also called Nosy Boraha, Ilot Madame, at the entrance of the Bay of Ambodifotatra, Ile aux Forbans in the middle of this bay, Ile aux Baleines (or Nosy Boeny) in the East, the three Ilots Sables in the South-East, and Ile aux Nattes in the South.

Ile aux Nattes and Sainte Marie (Nosy Boraha) are separated by a sound of 200m.
