= Mimapomecyna =

Scientific classification
- Kingdom: Animalia
- Phylum: Arthropoda
- Class: Insecta
- Order: Coleoptera
- Suborder: Polyphaga
- Infraorder: Cucujiformia
- Family: Cerambycidae
- Tribe: Acanthocinini
- Genus: Mimapomecyna; Breuning, 1957

Genus of beetles

Mimapomecyna is a genus of beetles in the family Cerambycidae. It is known from Madagascar.

== Species ==
There are two recognized species:

- Mimapomecyna biplagiatipennis Breuning, 1961
- Mimapomecyna flavostictica Breuning, 1957
