= Mimapomecyna flavostictica =

Scientific classification
- Kingdom: Animalia
- Phylum: Arthropoda
- Class: Insecta
- Order: Coleoptera
- Suborder: Polyphaga
- Infraorder: Cucujiformia
- Family: Cerambycidae
- Genus: Mimapomecyna
- Species: M. flavostictica

Binomial name
- Mimapomecyna flavostictica Breuning, 1957

Species of beetle

Mimapomecyna flavostictica is a species of beetle in the family Cerambycidae. It was described by Stephan von Breuning in 1957. It is known from Madagascar.

Mimapomecyna flavostictica measure 13 mm (0.51 in) in length.
