= Ilot Madame Museum =

- Location: Île Sainte-Marie
- Type: Piracy museum

The Ilot Madame Museum is a museum located on the island of Île Sainte-Marie in Madagascar. The museum displays the piracy history of the island.
