= Ratsimilaho =

Betsimisaraka king (1694–1750)

- Born: c. 1694; Madagascar
- Died: 1750; Betsimisaraka Confederation
- Education: England
- Occupation: King
- Title: filoha be
- Spouse: Queen Bita
- Children: Zanahary
- Parent: Princess Antavaratra Rahena

Ratsimilaho (c.1694 – 1750) was a ruler of an east coastal region of Madagascar. He is said to be the son of an English pirate Thomas Tew and a Malagasy queen regnant, Antavaratra Rahena. The region, known as the Betsimisaraka Confederation, covered 400 miles (640 km) of coast and this legacy was created by Ratsimilaho. The Betsimisaraka make up approximately fifteen percent of the Malagasy people and are the second largest group in Madagascar after the Merina.

== Biography ==
Ratsimilaho was reputedly born as a result of the hospitality shown by the queen Antavaratra Rahena to an English pirate named "Thomas" (possibly Thomas Tew, Thomas White, or Thomas Collins) when he arrived to show his accreditation as a privateer. The pirate is said to have adopted the resulting child and taken the boy briefly to England where he had some education. Now "according to most chroniclers", whilst Ratsimilaho had been away there had been a redistribution of power. The tribes to the south under their leader Ramano had captured the territory to the north of Tamatave as they were jealous of the riches arising from the trade with the Europeans.

Ratsimilaho's initial approach was to negotiate with Ramano and the Tsikoa clans, but this proved impossible. He therefore called a meeting, a kabary, of the leaders and after much debate he persuaded them to give him the power to lead them in a battle. Ratsimilaho was given the title of filoha be and he used this power to create a new state. Driving out the Southern clans and resisting their later attempts at reinvasion he was victorious. The southern tribes were then called those who wear red mud.

In 1712, Ratsimilato obtained a new treaty and it was at this time that his people took on the title of Betsimisaraka meaning the many who will not be sundered, whilst his descendants were known as the Zana-Malatas, the "children of the mulattos". He is said to have requested a wife from the people known as Zafimbolamena (Grandchildren of Gold) who were part of the Sakalava people. The resulting child, a son, was named Zanahary - a name now used in Madagascar to mean a God.

Ramaromanompo was the new name taken by Ratsimilaho meaning he who is served by many. This important Betsimisaraka federation lasted principally until 1750/51, ending either because of the death of the filoha be or because of internal squabbles. The confederation continued after his death but there was pressure from outside and disagreement within. However his legacy, the Betsimisaraka territory included the important port Toamasina, Fenerive, Maroansetra commanding Antongil Bay, the largest bay in Madagascar.

After his death, his daughter, Bity, became queen. She married a French corporal and it is said that this is what gave France its first claim. She reigned with her husband, until Ratsimilaho's son, Zanahary, became leader.
