= Nosy Boraha =

Island in Madagascar

Sainte-Marie Nosy-Boraha Ambodifotatra
- Commune and town
- Location in Madagascar
- Coordinates: 16°58′0″S 49°52′0″E
- Country: Madagascar
- Region: Analanjirofo
- District: Nosy Boraha District

Government
  - Major: Ismak Ado Crophe Beassou

Population (Commune de Ste.Marie)
  - Total: 30,000
- Time zone: UTC3 (EAT)

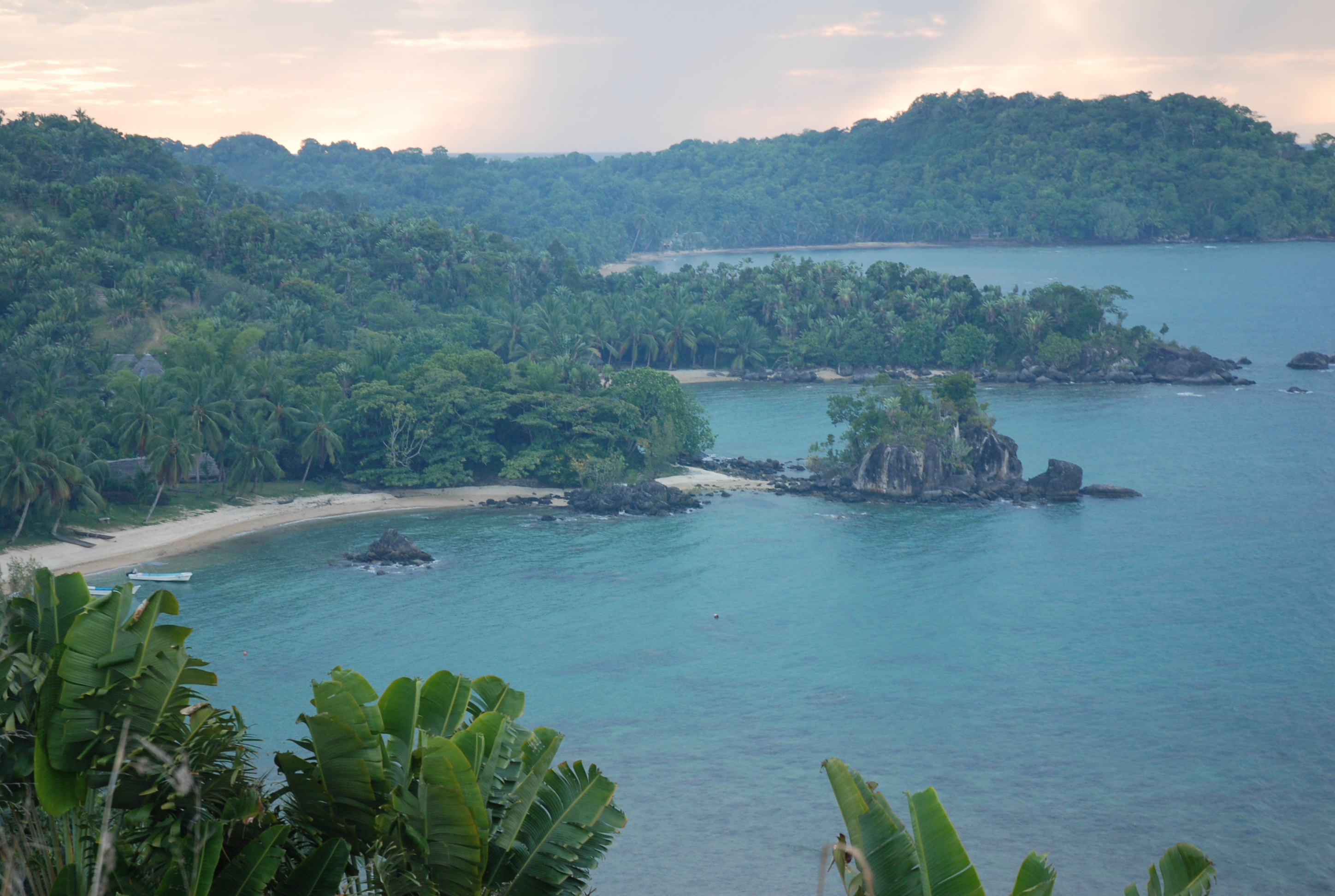
La Crique beach

Nosy Boraha [ˈnuɕ buˈrahə̥], also known as Sainte-Marie, main town Ambodifotatra, is an island off the east coast of Madagascar. The island forms an administrative district within Analanjirofo Region, and covers an area of 222 km^{2}. It has a population estimated at 30,000.

Nosy Boraha is known for its preserved character, whale watching, beautiful beaches, and history as a pirate haven.

== Administration ==
The island is organized as the city (commune urbaine) and district of Nosy Boraha in Analanjirofo Region.

- 1 town hall
- 17 fokontany (villages)
- 1 deputy

== Population ==
The Betsimisaraka are the largest ethnic group on the island, though there had been a long history of mixed marriages, including with pirates in the 17th century.

== Transport infrastructure ==
- 1 international airport in the South (inaugurated 2015)
- 1 commercial port (Ilot Madame)
- 1 passenger port (Ambodifotatra)

Ferries leave from Soanierana Ivongo and Mahambo. There are also boats from Toamasina.

== Geography ==
This island is 60 kilometres (37 miles) long and less than 10 kilometres (6.2 miles) wide.

=== Climate ===
Climate data for Nosy Boraha (1991–2020)
Month	Jan	Feb	Mar	Apr	May	Jun	Jul	Aug	Sep	Oct	Nov	Dec	Year
Record high °C (°F)	34.9 (94.8)	35.1 (95.2)	34.0 (93.2)	33.0 (91.4)	32.3 (90.1)	31.6 (88.9)	29.7 (85.5)	29.7 (85.5)	30.6 (87.1)	31.4 (88.5)	33.1 (91.6)	34.5 (94.1)	35.1 (95.2)
Mean daily maximum °C (°F)	30.3 (86.5)	30.2 (86.4)	29.8 (85.6)	29.0 (84.2)	27.9 (82.2)	26.3 (79.3)	25.4 (77.7)	25.6 (78.1)	26.6 (79.9)	27.8 (82.0)	29.1 (84.4)	30.2 (86.4)	28.2 (82.8)
Daily mean °C (°F)	27.5 (81.5)	27.5 (81.5)	27.1 (80.8)	26.4 (79.5)	25.2 (77.4)	23.8 (74.8)	22.8 (73.0)	22.9 (73.2)	23.6 (74.5)	24.8 (76.6)	26.0 (78.8)	27.1 (80.8)	25.4 (77.7)
Mean daily minimum °C (°F)	24.6 (76.3)	24.6 (76.3)	24.4 (75.9)	23.7 (74.7)	22.5 (72.5)	21.2 (70.2)	20.1 (68.2)	20.1 (68.2)	20.5 (68.9)	21.7 (71.1)	22.8 (73.0)	24.0 (75.2)	22.5 (72.5)
Record low °C (°F)	18.8 (65.8)	20.0 (68.0)	18.9 (66.0)	19.5 (67.1)	16.3 (61.3)	16.6 (61.9)	15.0 (59.0)	15.1 (59.2)	15.7 (60.3)	16.9 (62.4)	17.4 (63.3)	20.0 (68.0)	15.0 (59.0)
Average precipitation mm (inches)	389.9 (15.35)	460.7 (18.14)	469.8 (18.50)	375.5 (14.78)	347.9 (13.70)	273.3 (10.76)	292.5 (11.52)	131.5 (5.18)	80.6 (3.17)	78.5 (3.09)	99.9 (3.93)	229.0 (9.02)	3,229.1 (127.13)
Average precipitation days (≥ 1.0 mm)	17.5	17.7	20.8	20.0	18.8	20.8	21.6	15.7	12.0	10.4	9.6	13.7	198.6
Source: NOAA

== Whale watching ==
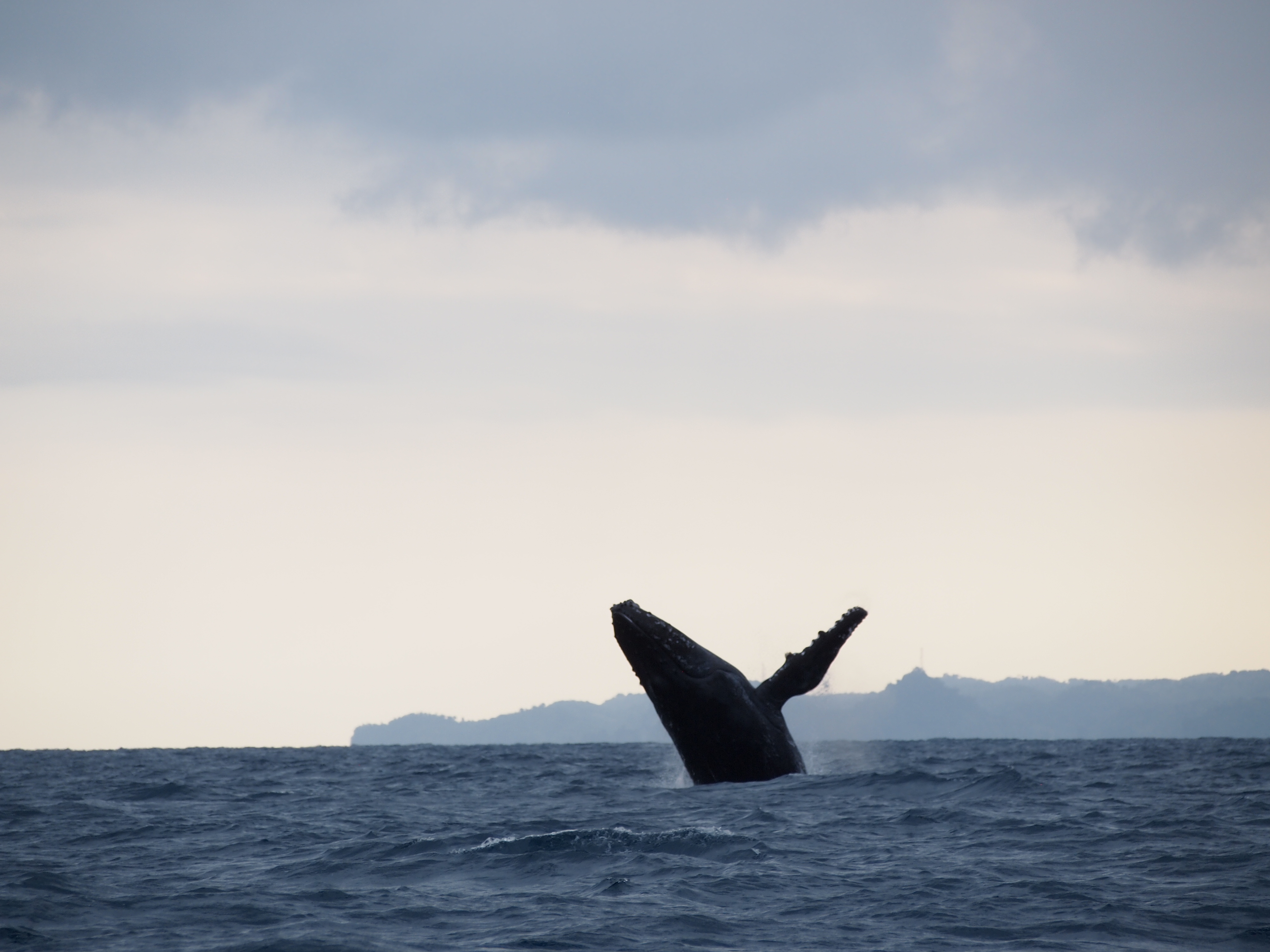
Humpback whale breaching off the coast

The channel between Nosy Boraha and Madagascar is known for whale watching. Substantial pods of humpback whales (Megaptera) migrate from the Antarctic to the Baie de Tintingue, where the conditions are well suited for mating and raising calves before their annual migration to colder water. Although scarce, southern right whales as a part of the recolonization of their former ranges, are known to appear along the coast from time to time.

== History ==
=== Golden age of piracy ===
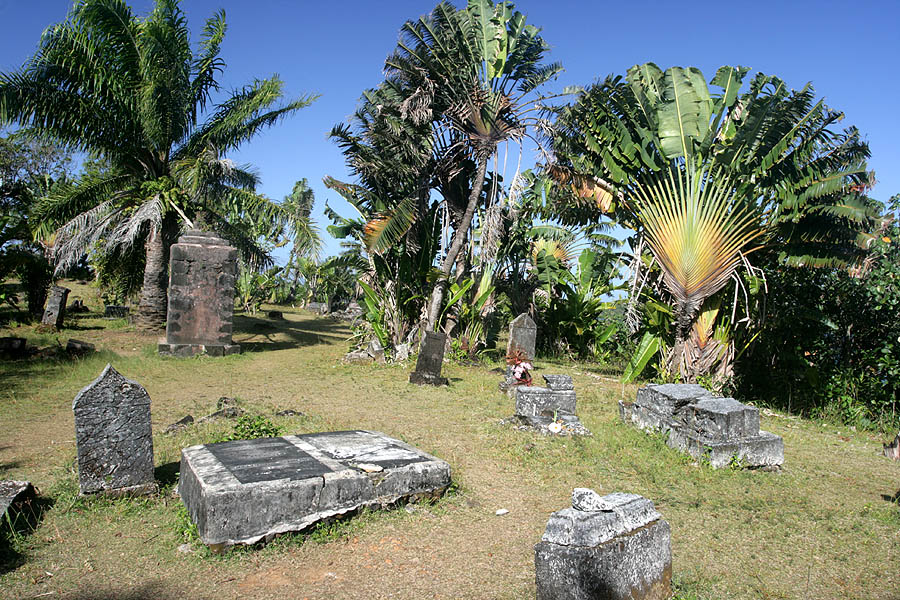
The pirate cemetery on Nosy Boraha

Île Sainte-Marie, or St. Mary's Island as it is known in English, became a popular base for pirates, between the 17th and 18th centuries. Beginning with Adam Baldridge in 1691 and ending with John Pro in 1719, the location was favourable for pirate activity, being near maritime routes travelled by ships returning from the East Indies, their holds overflowing with loot. The location also provided bays and inlets for protection from storms, abundant fruit and quiet waters. Legendary pirates including William Kidd, Robert Culliford, Olivier Levasseur (La Buse) who wrote a cryptogram, Henry Every, Abraham Samuel and Thomas Tew lived in the île aux Forbans, an island located in the bay of Sainte Marie's main town, Ambodifotatra. Many of them were interred in cemeteries on Nosy Boraha, although the remains have never been identified. It was rumored that the legendary Pirate Republic founded by Henry Every existed in this area. It was said that Every reigned there as a Pirate King or Emperor.

There is a legend that a French pirate named Misson established a pirate republic called "Libertalia" in Antsiranana Bay, located in the northern part of the island of Madagascar. This legend is believed to be a fictional creation inspired by the story of Every's pirate kingdom.

=== French colonization ===
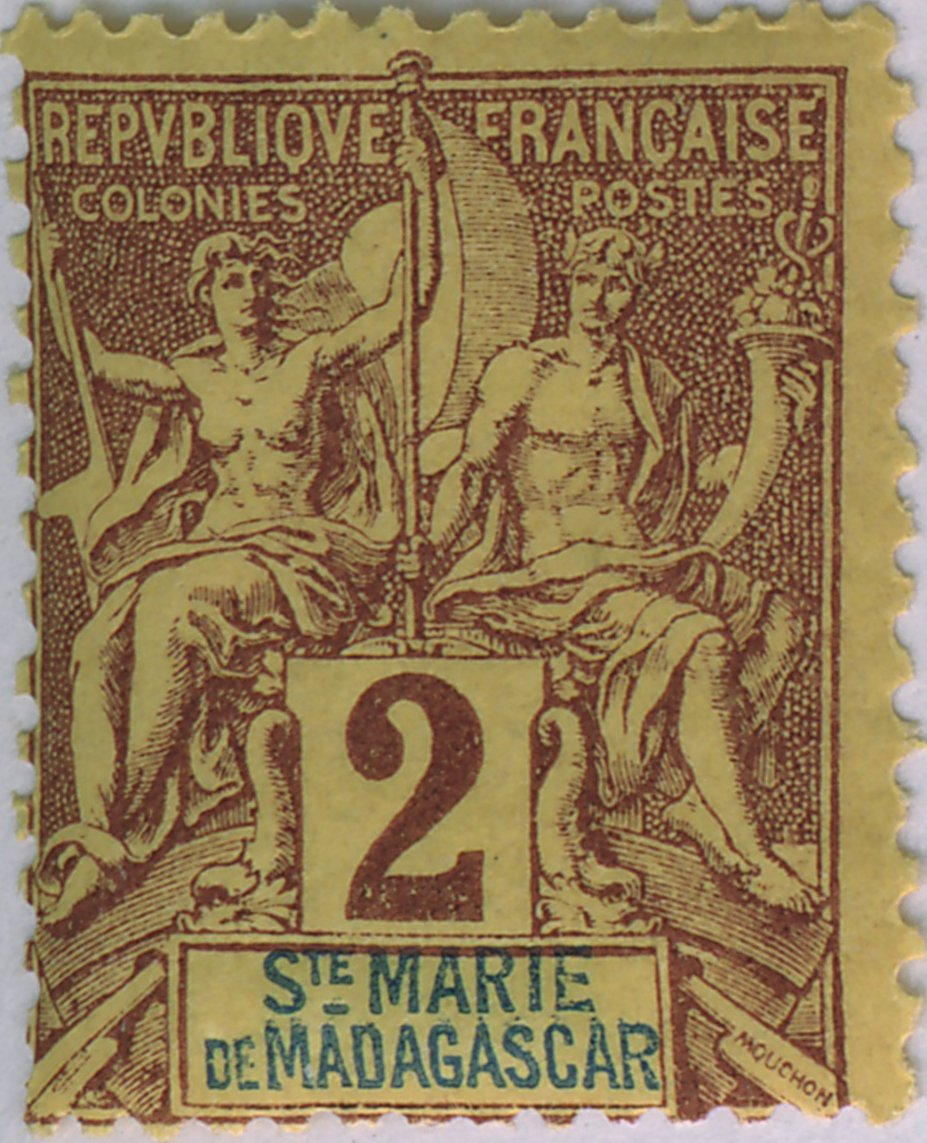
French postage stamp from 1892 for the colony of Sainte Marie de Madagascar

In 1750, the ruler of the Kingdom of Betsimisaraka, Bety of Betsimisaraka, ceded the Island to the Kingdom of France in a Treaty. However, in 1752 the French colonists were massacred when the local population rebelled. France left the settlement abandoned for roughly half a century until returning in 1818, when the island was converted into a penal colony. In 1857 the French established the first Catholic church in Madagascar, which is still in use today. French rule came to an end in 1960 after the island's population voted in a referendum to join the Malagasy Republic.

== Diving ==
Free from sharks, the lagoon of the island is endowed with significant coralline growth. Its underwater fauna is conserved as a natural heritage and popular diving site in the Indian Ocean.

In 2015, a large 55 kg (121 lb) ingot, which was believed to be silver and part of Captain Kidd's treasure, was found off the coast of the island. After analysis, UNESCO determined that the piece actually consisted of 95% lead; they judged it to be "a broken part of the Sainte-Marie port constructions."

== Fauna and flora ==
The insular character and the coralline soil encouraged various adaptations, as much of animal as of plant structure. Thus, Boraha is endowed with a rich fauna and flora. There are several species of lemur as well as numerous orchid species, among which is the "Queen of Madagascar" (Eulophiella roempleriana).

The island was home to the only known population of Delalande's coua, a species of cuckoo that became extinct in the 19th century, likely because of a mixture of deforestation, over-exploitation, and reducing food sources as a result of introduced rats.

== Museums ==
Ilot Madame Museum is the only museum found on this island.

== Popular culture ==
Nosy Boraha is the setting for the fantasy historical children's book Kintana and the Captain's Curse by Susan Brownrigg. (Uclan Publishing, July 2021.) It is also featured in the retelling of Peter Pan, "The Adventures of Mary Darling" by Pat Murphy (Tachyon Publications, May 2025.)

== Crime ==
Violent assaults have been reported on the island and it is not recommended to visit alone.

== Gallery ==
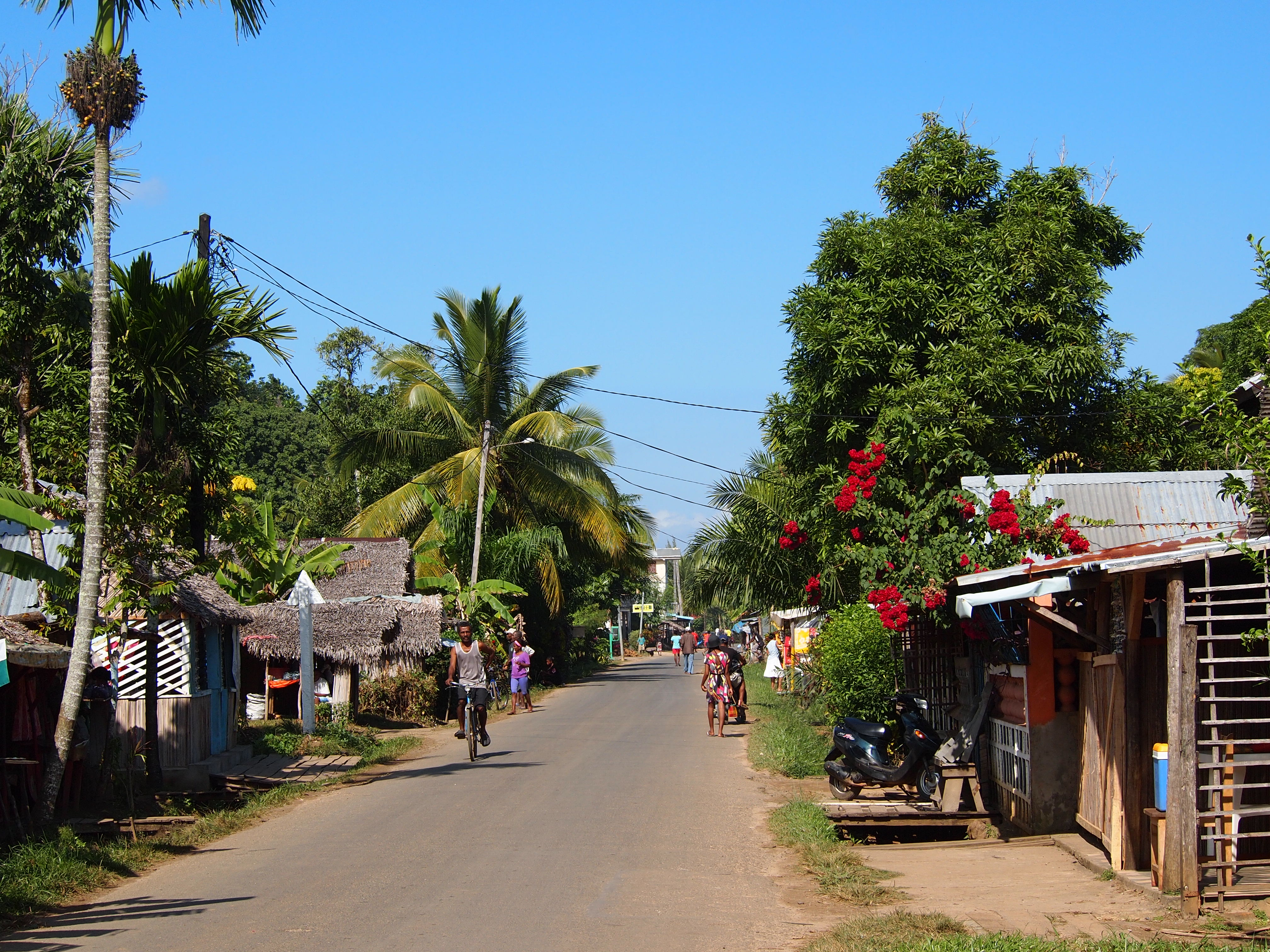
The island's paved road runs up the west coast.

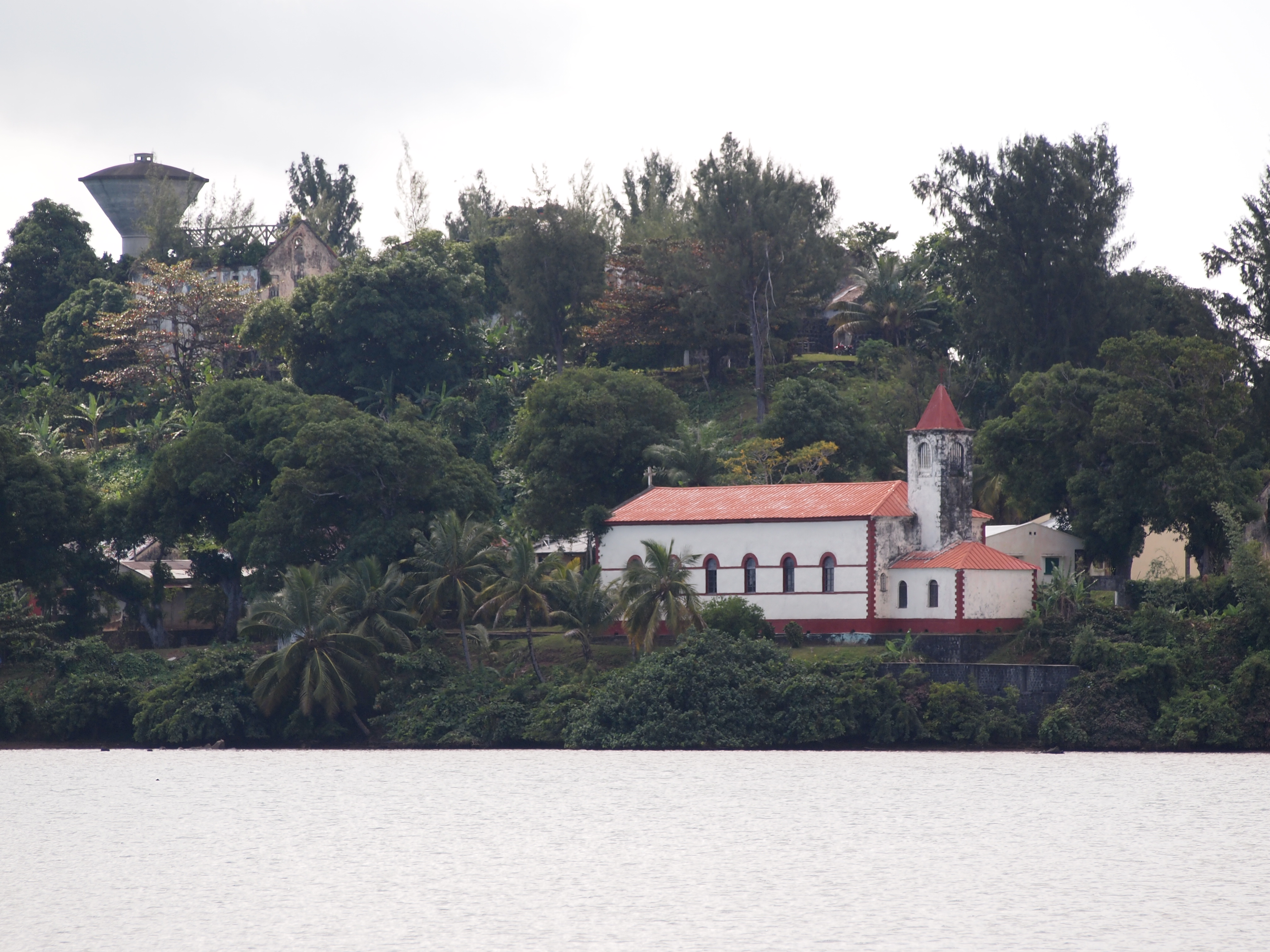
Madagascar's first church was built here by the French.

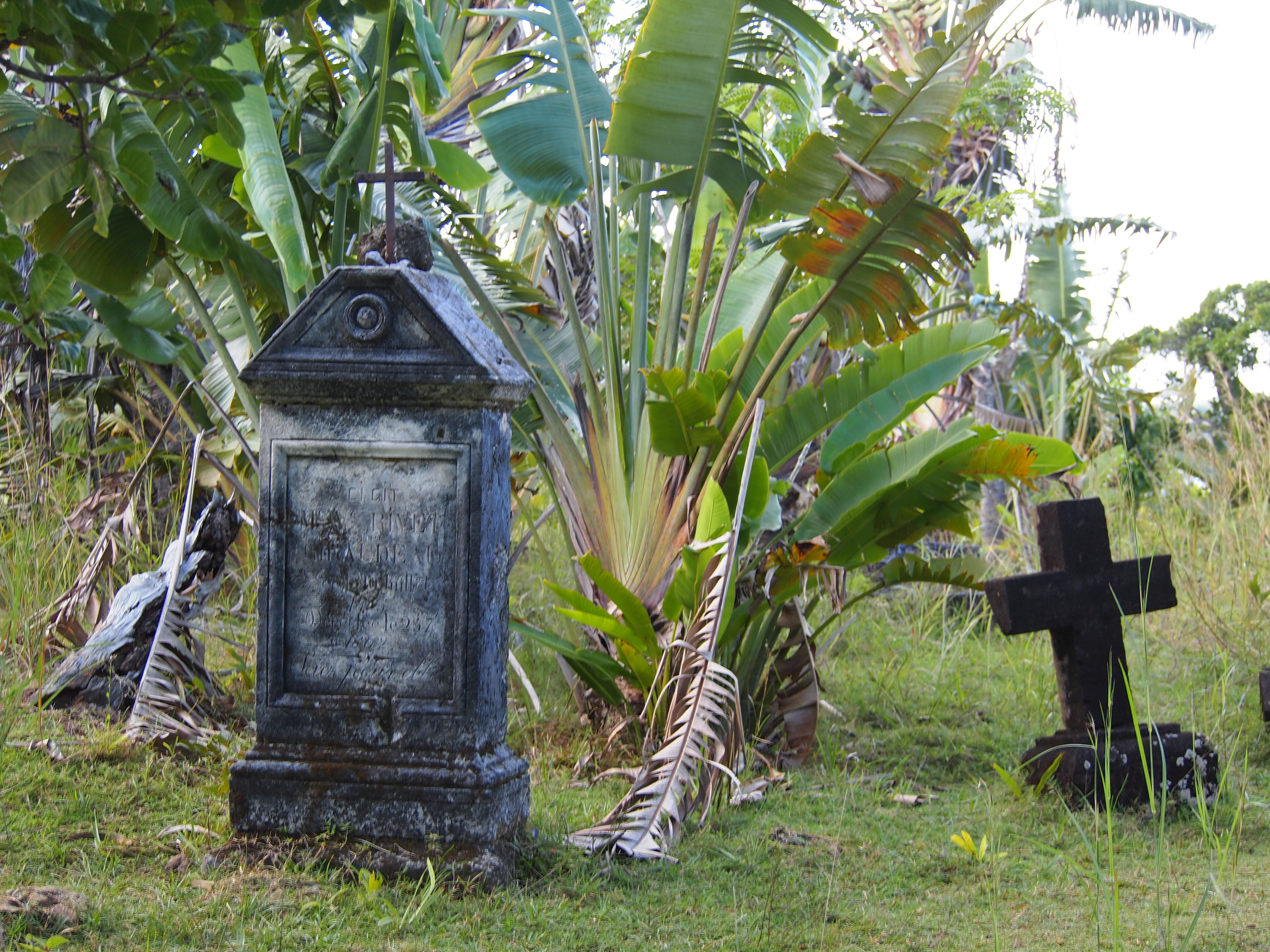
The pirate cemetery is a popular tourist destination.

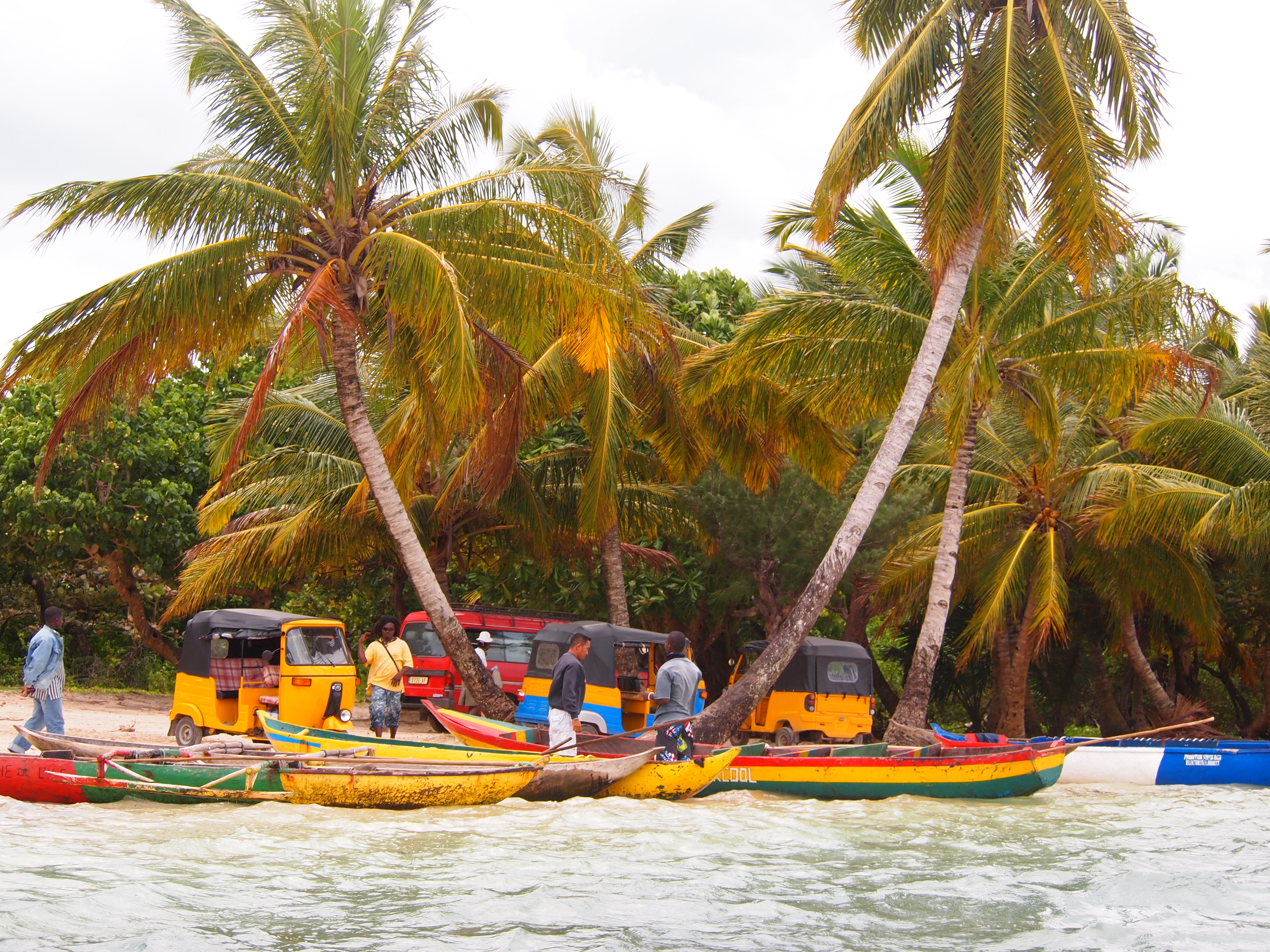
Dugout canoes ferry passengers between Nosy Boraha and Île aux Nattes.

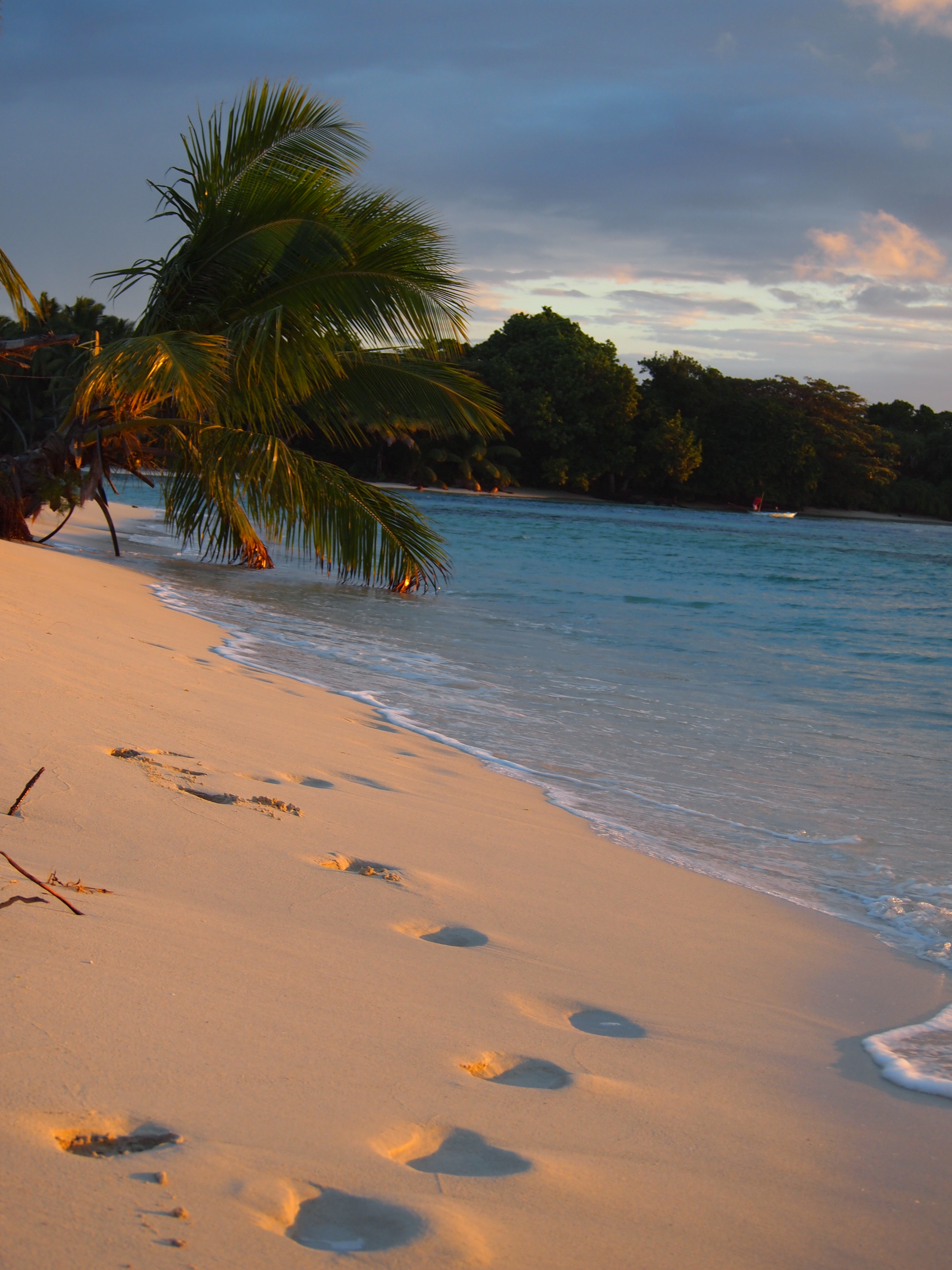
View of Île aux Nattes from Nosy Boraha

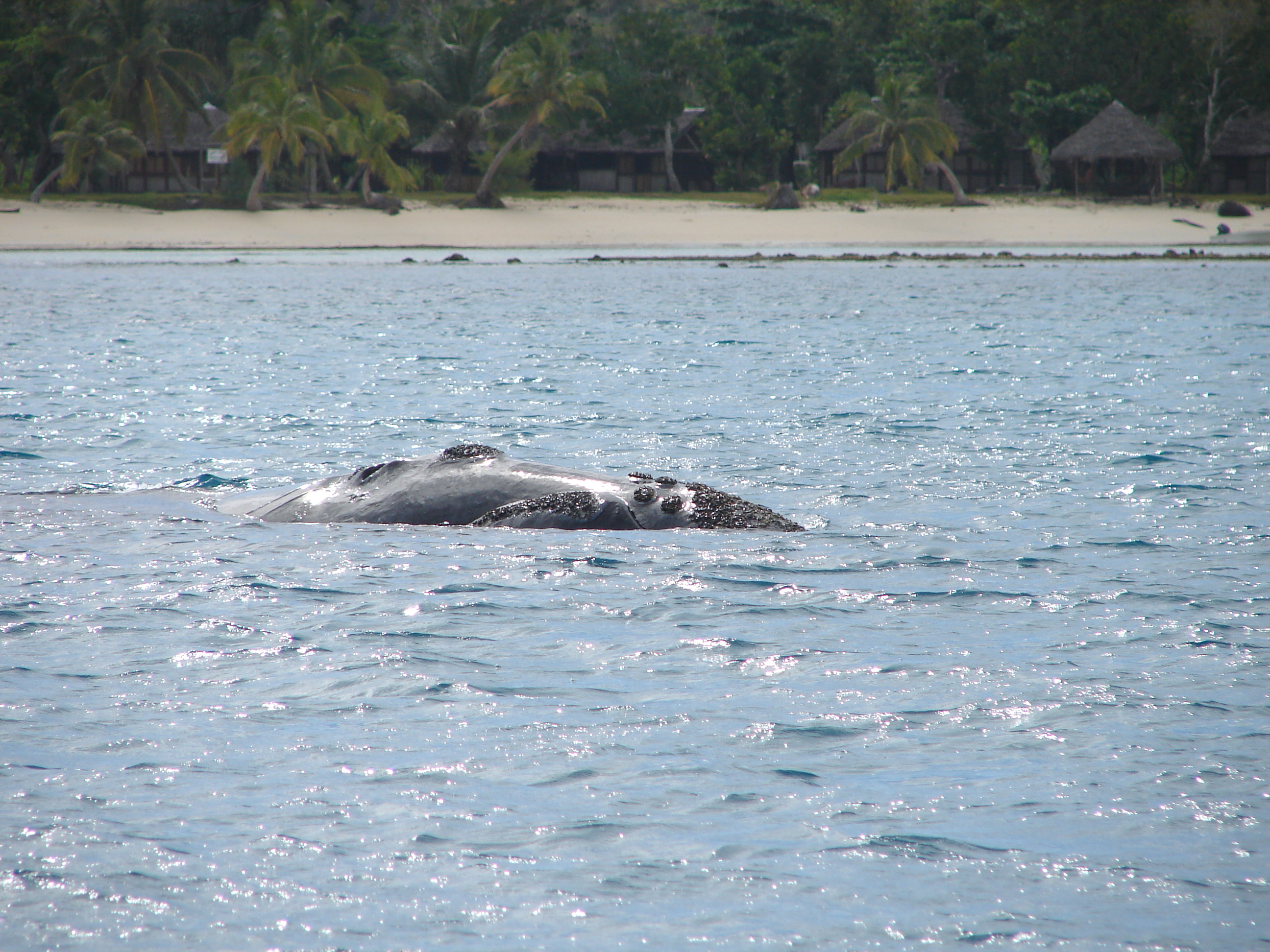
Rare southern right whale at Nosy Boraha

== See also ==
- Bety of Betsimisaraka
- Île aux Nattes
