= Betsimisaraka people =

Ethnic group in Madagascar

Betsimisaraka
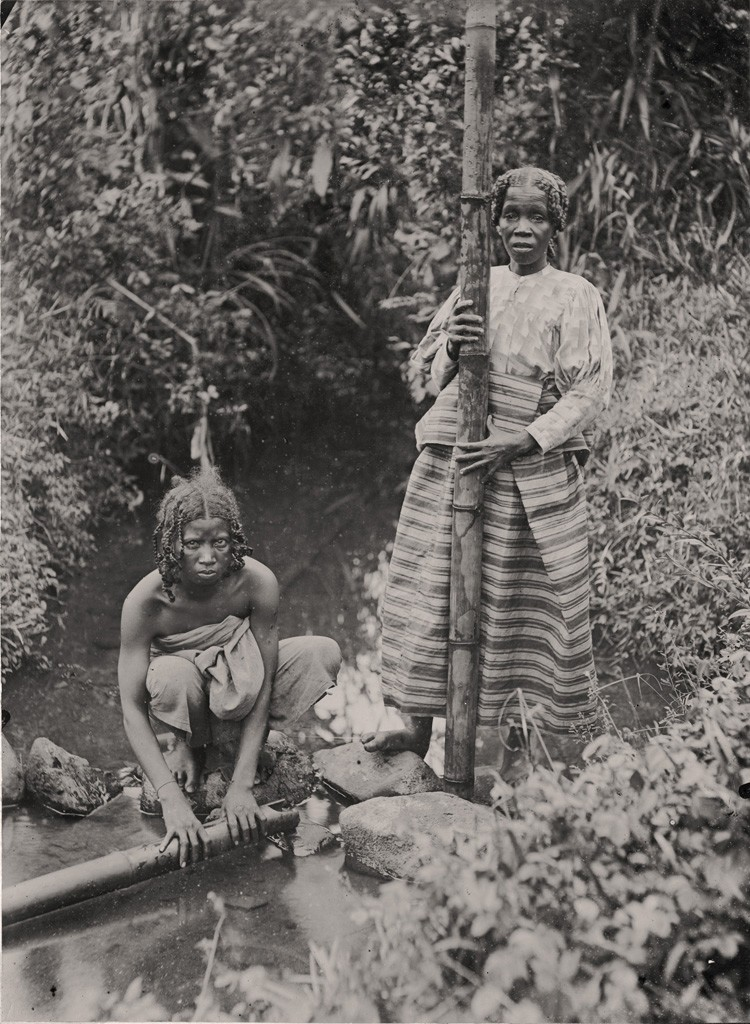
- Betsimisaraka women

Total population
- over 1,500,000 (2011)

Regions with significant populations
- East coast of Madagascar

Languages
- Northern Betsimisaraka; Southern Betsimisaraka

Religion
- Christianity syncretic with traditional religion

Related ethnic groups
- Tsimihety, Bantu peoples, Austronesians

The Betsimisaraka (lit. 'the many inseparables') are the second largest ethnic group in Madagascar after the Merina and make up approximately fifteen percent of the Malagasy people. They occupy a large stretch of the eastern coastal region of Madagascar, from Mananjary in the south to Antalaha in the north. The Betsimisaraka have a long history of extensive interaction with European seafarers, pirates and bourgeois traders, which produced a significant subset with mixed European-Malagasy origins, termed the zana-malata. European influence is evident in the local valse (waltz) and basesa musical genres, which are typically performed on the accordion. Tromba (spirit possession) ceremonies feature strongly in Betsimisaraka culture.

Through the late 17th century, the various clans of the eastern coastal region were governed by chieftains who typically ruled over one or two villages. A zana-malata pirate named Ratsimilaho emerged to unite these clans under his rule in 1710. His reign lasted 50 years and established a sense of common identity and stability throughout the kingdom. But his successors gradually weakened this union, leaving it vulnerable to the growing influence and presence of European and particularly French settlers, (slave traders), missionaries and merchants. The fractured Betsimisaraka kingdom was easily colonised in 1817 by Radama I, king of Imerina who ruled from its capital at Antananarivo in the Central Highlands. The subjugation of the Betsimisaraka in the 19th century left the population relatively impoverished; under colonisation by the French (1896-1960), a focused effort was made to increase access to education and paid employment working on French plantations. Production of former plantation crops like vanilla, ylang-ylang, coconut oil, and coffee remain the principal economic activity of the region beyond subsistence farming and fishing, although mining is also a source of income.

Culturally, the Betsimisaraka can be divided into northern and southern sub-groups. Many elements of culture are common across both groups, including respect for ancestors, spirit possession, the ritual sacrifice of zebu, and a patriarchal social structure. The groups are distinguished by linguistic sub-dialects and various fady (taboos), as well as certain funeral practices and other customs. The Betsimisaraka practice famadihana (reburial) and sambatra (circumcision) and believe in sorcery and a wide range of supernatural forces. Many taboos and folktales revolve around lemurs and crocodiles, both of which are common throughout Betsimisaraka territory.

== Ethnic identity ==
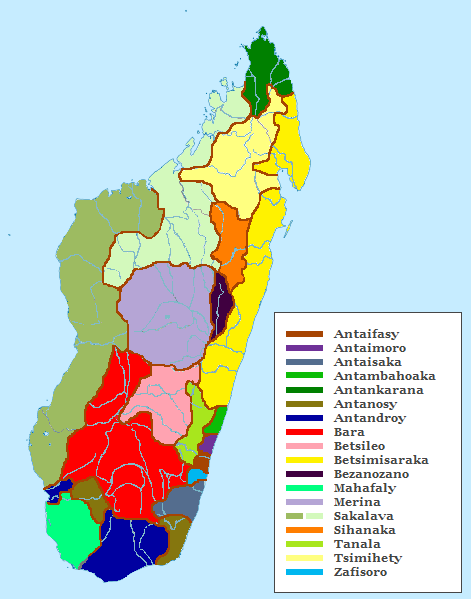
Distribution of Malagasy ethnic groups

The Betsimisaraka constitute approximately 15 percent of the population of Madagascar and numbered over 1,500,000 in 2011. A sub-set of the population, the zana-malata, has partly European origins resulting from generations of intermarriage between the local Malagasy population and European pirates, sailors and traders who docked or settled along the eastern coast. Like the Sakalava to the west, the Betsimisaraka are composed of numerous ethnic sub-groups that formed a confederation in the early 18th century. Like all Malagasy groups, the Betsimisaraka are of mixed Bantu African and Austronesian Asian ancestry. However, they are among the Malagasy communities with a stronger East African Bantu heritage, with the average individual having about 70% East African ancestry. As a result, the Betsimisaraka tend to have more African than Asian physical features compared to the Merina people. The Betsimisaraka occupy a long, narrow band of territory that stretches along the east coast of Madagascar from Mananjary in the south to Antalaha in the north, including the island's main port at Toamasina and the major towns of Fénérive Est and Maroansetra. They are often subdivided into northern Betsimisaraka (Antavaratra) and southern Betsimisaraka (Antatsimo), separated by the Betanimena Betsimisaraka sub-clan (called the Tsikoa before around 1710).

== History ==
Until the beginning of the 18th century, the peoples who would constitute the core of the Betsimisaraka were organized into numerous clans under the authority of chiefs (filohany) who each typically ruled over no more than one or two villages. Those around Antongil Bay in the north held a comparatively more official position, with regalia of leadership attested since at least 1500. The presence of natural bays along the northern coastline that became the port towns of Antongil, Titingue, Foulpointe, Fenerive and Tamatave favored the economic and political development of the Antavaratra Betsimisaraka; the southern portion of this coastline, by contrast, lacked any areas suitable for ports. Villagers in the areas surrounding the ports exported rice, cattle, slaves and other goods to the nearby Mascarene Islands. The eastern ports' strategic position for regional trade attracted the heaviest settlement of Europeans to this portion of the island, particularly including British and American pirates whose numbers dramatically increased from the 1680s to the 1720s along the coast from modern day Antsiranana in the north to Nosy Boraha and Foulpointe to the east. Intermarriage between these European pirates and the daughters of local chiefs produced a large mixed population termed zana-malata.

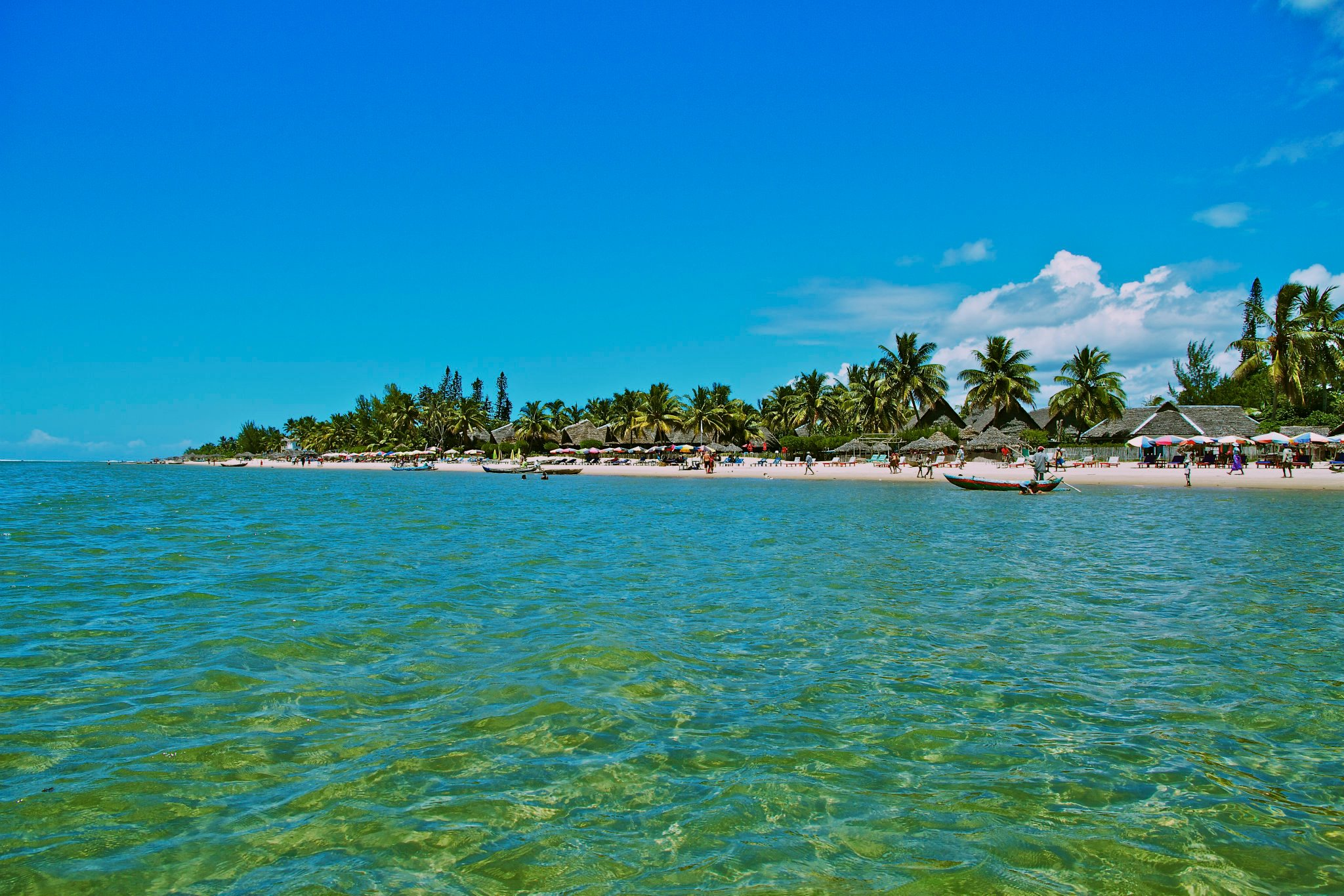
Ratsimilaho ruled the united Betsimisaraka from his capital at modern day Foulpointe.

Around 1700 the Tsikoa began uniting around a series of powerful leaders. Ramanano, the chief of Vatomandry, was elected in 1710 as the leader of the Tsikoa ("those who are steadfast") and initiated invasions of the northern ports. According to oral histories, Ramanano established an armed militia at Vohimasina which he sent on incursions to burn neighboring villages, desecrate local tombs, and enslave the women and children, contributing to his reputation as a cruel and unpopular leader. A northern Betsimisaraka zana-malata named Ratsimilaho, who was born to the daughter of a local filohany and a British pirate named Thomas Tew around 1694 and had briefly traveled with his father to England and India, led a resistance to these invasions and successfully united his compatriots around this cause despite his young age. He captured Fenerive in 1712, causing the Tsikoa to flee across soggy red fields of clay that stuck to their feet, earning them the new name of Betanimena ("Many of Red Earth"). Ratsimilaho was elected king of all the Betsimisaraka and given a new name, Ramaromanompo ("Lord Served by Many") at his capital at Foulpointe. He gave his northern compatriots the name Betsimisaraka to reaffirm their unity in the face of their enemies. He then negotiated peace with the Betanimena by offering their king control over the port of Tamatave, but this settlement fell apart after six months, leading Ratsimilaho to recapture Tamatave and force the Betanimena king to flee south. He established alliances with the southern Betsimisaraka and the neighboring Bezanozano, extending his authority over these areas by allowing local chiefs to maintain their power while offering tribute of rice, cattle and slaves; by 1730 he was one of the most powerful kings of Madagascar. By the time of his death in 1754, his moderate and stabilizing rule had provided nearly forty years of unity among the diverse clans within the Betsimisaraka political union. He also allied the Betsimisaraka with the other most powerful kingdom of the time, the Sakalava of the west coast, through marriage with Matave, the only daughter of Iboina king Andrianbaba.

Ratsimilaho's son Zanahary succeeded him in 1755. A despotic leader, Zanahary launched a series of attacks against villages under his authority and was assassinated by his own subjects in 1767. Zanahary was succeeded by his son Iavy, who was detested for continuing his father's practice of attacking villages under his control, and for enriching himself by cooperating with French slave traders. During the reign of Iavy, an eastern European adventurer named Maurice Benyowsky established a settlement in Betsimisaraka country and proclaimed himself king of Madagascar, persuading several local chieftains to no longer pay tribute to Iboina. This action provoked Sakalava ire, and in 1776 Sakalava soldiers invaded the area to punish the Betsimisaraka inhabitants and kill Benyowsky, but were ultimately unsuccessful in the latter goal. Zakavolo, Iavy's son, succeeded his father upon his death in 1791. European accounts disparage Zakavolo for insisting that they provide him with gifts, and for insulting them when the Europeans refused to meet his demands. His subjects deposed him in 1803 with the assistance of then Governor General Magallon, who administered the French island territories; Zakavolo was eventually assassinated by his ex-subjects. Throughout the decades following Ratsimilaho's death, the French established control over Ile Sainte Marie and had established trading ports throughout Betsimisaraka territory. By 1810 a French envoy named Sylvain Roux effectively had economic control over the port city, although it was nominally governed by Zakavolo's uncle Tsihala. A dispute among Tsihala's male relatives over control of the city led to further fracturing of Betsimisaraka political unity, weakening the ability of the Betsimisaraka to unite against increasing foreign encroachment. He lost power the following year to another zana-malata, Jean Rene, who maintained close cooperation with the French.

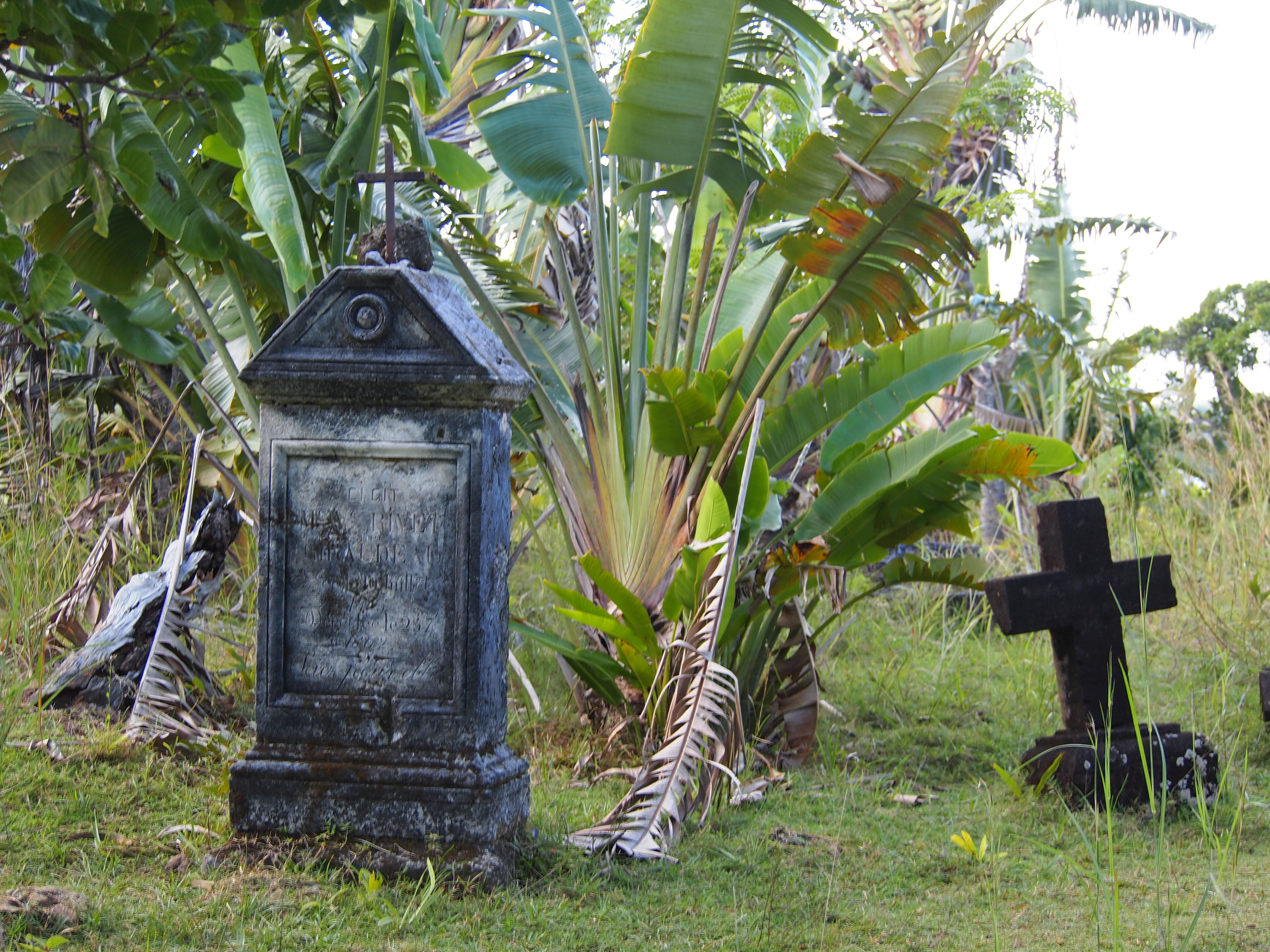
A pirate cemetery at Nosy Boraha. The zana-malata subset of the Betsimisaraka traced their heritage back to intermarriage between European pirates and Betsimisaraka women.

The Kingdom of Imerina in the island's center had been rapidly unifying and expanding since the late 18th century. In 1817, Merina king Radama I led an army of 25,000 soldiers from Antananarivo to successfully capture Toamasina. Although Jean Rene was not complicit and had been given no forewarning of the military campaign, when Radama arrived the Europeans and zana-malata were not expelled; rather, Radama developed a cooperation with them to develop diplomatic and economic relations with the French as he had already done over the past decade with British missionaries in the Merina homeland of the central highlands. The area was effectively colonized, with Merina garrisons established at ports and across the Betsimisaraka interior. The Betsimisaraka resented Merina domination and, not receiving assistance from the French as they had hoped, mounted an unsuccessful rebellion in 1825. As Merina presence and authority in the former Betsimisaraka kingdom grew, many local farmers migrated to areas outside Merina control or sought employment with European settlers on plantations where they might be afforded some protection. Any remnants of the ruling line in Betsimisaraka were eliminated under Merina queen Ranavalona I, who ordered many nobles to undergo the deadly tangena trial by ordeal. Throughout her reign, cultural practices associated with Europeans were forbidden, including Christianity and Western musical instruments; eventually all Europeans were expelled from the island for the duration of her reign. Her son, Radama II, lifted these restrictions and gradually European presence re-emerged in Betsimisaraka territory as French entrepreneurs established plantations for growing export crops like vanilla, coffee, tea and coconuts. The growing number of Merina colonists from the turn of the 19th century and Europeans from the 1860s onward created competition for use of the ports traditionally under Betsimisaraka control, to such an extent that the local population was prohibited from trading to maximize profits for the Merina and Europeans. This severe economic constraint, coupled with the heavy Merina imposition of fanampoana (unpaid labor in lieu of taxes), severely undermined the prosperity of the local population, who resisted by refusing to grow surplus crops that would only further enrich the outside traders. Others fled the settled life of their ancestral villages to take refuge in the forest in order to live outside Merina authority. Some of these formed into groups of bandits who plundered Merina trading parties along the east coast and mounted occasional raids further into Merina territory; these groups also periodically attacked Merina settlers, European missionaries, government outposts and churches.

When the French colonized Madagascar in 1896, initial Betsimisaraka satisfaction with the fall of the Merina government rapidly evolved into displeasure with French control. This led to an uprising the same year among Betsimisaraka, particularly including the bandits and other outlaws who had long been living according to their own law in the eastern rainforests; the movement extended to the broader Betsimisaraka population, who mounted a strong resistance to French rule in 1895. These efforts were eventually subdued. After regaining control, the French colonial authority took steps to address the repercussions of historical subjugation of the Betsimisaraka by the Merina kingdom, providing increased access to basic education as well as opportunities for paid labor at plantations, but often on former Betsimisaraka land that the French authorities had forced local inhabitants to relinquish to colonists.

In 1947, a nationwide uprising against French colonial rule was initiated in Moramanga, a town in Bezanozano territory neighboring the Betsimisaraka. During the conflict, Betsimisaraka nationalists fought French and Senegalese soldiers in an unsuccessful attempt to regain control of the port at Tamatave, the island's most important trading port. Betsimisaraka fighters and civilians suffered very heavy losses and some of the worst human rights abuses, including execution by being thrown alive from airplanes.

The country gained independence in 1960. It was led throughout the Second Republic (1975-1992) by Admiral Didier Ratsiraka, a Betsimisaraka. He was democratically elected president and again led the country from 1995 to 2001 during the Third Republic before being forced from power following contested 2001 presidential election by followers of Merina businessman and opposition leader Marc Ravalomanana. He remains an influential and controversial political figure in Madagascar. Ratsiraka's nephew, Roland Ratsiraka, is likewise a significant political figure, having run for president and serving as mayor of Toamasina, the country's main commercial port.

== Society ==
Social life revolves around the agricultural year, with preparation of fields beginning in October, the harvest of rice in May, and the winter months from June to September set aside for ancestor worship and other major rituals and customs.

There are clear gender divisions among the Betsimisaraka. When traveling by foot in a mixed gender group, it is forbidden for women to walk before men. Women are traditionally the ones to act as porters, carrying light items on the head and heavy items on the back; if a woman is present, it is considered ridiculous for a man to carry something. When eating, men use a single spoon to fill their plates from the communal bowl and to eat the food on their plates, whereas women are required to use two separate spoons to fill their plates and to eat. Men are generally responsible for tilling the rice fields, obtaining food, gathering firewood and building the family home and furniture, and they engage in discussion and debate about public affairs. Women's tasks include growing crops, weeding the rice fields and harvesting and processing the rice, fetching water, lighting the hearth fire and preparing daily meals, and weaving.

=== Religious affiliation ===
Religious rites and customs are traditionally presided over by a tangalamena officiant. Betsimisaraka communities widely believe in various supernatural creatures, including ghosts (angatra), mermaids (zazavavy an-drano) and the imp-like kalamoro. Efforts to Christianize the local population began in the early 19th century but were largely unsuccessful at first. During the colonial period the influence of Christianity among the local population grew, but where it is practiced is often blended syncretically with traditional ancestor worship. Syncretism of Christian and indigenous beliefs led to the motif that the sun (or the moon) was the original location for the Garden of Eden.

== Culture ==
Although there are differences between the northern and southern Betsimisaraka, many major aspects of their culture are similar. Major customs among the Betsimisaraka include sambatra (circumcision), folanaka (the birth of a tenth child), ritual sacrifice of zebu for the ancestors, and celebrating the inauguration of a newly constructed house. Marriage, death, birth, the New Year and Independence Day are also communally celebrated. The practice of tromba (ritual spirit possession) is widespread among the Betsimisaraka. Both men and women act as mediums and spectators in these events.

The indigenous raffia palm was the base fiber for the clothing traditionally worn by the Betsimisaraka. Leaves of the raffia were combed to separate the fibers, which were knotted end to end to form strands that could then be woven together to form cloth. Among the various peoples who united under the Betsimisaraka confederation, women wore a short wrapper (simbo), typically with a bandeau top (akanjo), while men wore smocks. Traditional raffia clothing is still worn by some Betsimisaraka today.

The Betsimisaraka hold lemurs in high regard and tell several legends in which lemurs come to the aid of prominent Betsimisaraka figures. According to one story, a lemur saved the life of a Betsimisaraka ancestor from a grave peril. In another tale, a group of Betsimisaraka sought refuge in a forest from a marauding enemy group. Their enemies followed them into the forest, tracking the Betsimisaraka by what they believed to be the sound of their voices. Upon reaching the source of the sound they discovered a group of ghostly-looking lemurs and, believing the Betsimisaraka had been transformed into animals by magic, fled the area in terror. The spirits of Betsimisaraka ancestors are believed to reside inside the bodies of lemurs. Consequently, in general it is forbidden for the Betsimisaraka to kill or eat lemurs, and it is obligatory to free a trapped lemur and to bury a dead lemur with the same rites as a person.

Crocodiles are also viewed with reverence and fear. At river banks where they are known to gather, it is not uncommon for Betsimisaraka villagers to throw them zebu hindquarters (the most favored cut), whole geese and other offerings on a daily basis. Amulets for protection against crocodiles are commonly worn or thrown into the water in areas where the animals congregate. It is commonly believed that witches and sorcerers are closely linked with crocodiles, being capable of ordering them to kill others and of walking among them without being attacked. The Betsimisaraka believe witches and sorcerers appease crocodiles by feeding them rice at night, and some are accused of walking crocodiles through Betsimisaraka villages at midnight or even being married to the crocodiles, which they then enslave to do their bidding.

=== Fady ===
Among some Betsimisaraka it is considered fady for a brother to shake hands with his sister, or for young men to wear shoes during their father's lifetime. Among many Betsimisaraka, the eel is considered sacred. It is forbidden to touch, fish or eat eel. Although many coastal Malagasy communities have a fady against the consumption of pork, this is not universal or common among the Betsimisaraka, who often keep pigs in their villages.

Complex taboos and rites are associated with a woman's first childbirth. When about to give birth she is secluded in a special birthing house called a komby. The leaves she eats from and the waste produced by the newborn are kept in a special receptacle for seven days, at which point they are burned. The ash produced is rubbed on the forehead and cheeks of the mother and baby and must be worn for seven days. On the fifteenth day both are bathed in water in which lime or lemon leaves have been soaked. This ritual is called ranom-boahangy (bath of the leaves). The community gathers to drink rum and celebrate with wrestling matches, but the mother must stay in the komby. She is not allowed to consume anything other than saonjo greens and a chicken specially prepared for her. After this celebration she is required to leave the komby and can return to routine life.

Among the Betsimisaraka, like several other Malagasy ethnic groups, there is a fady against speaking the name of a chief after his death or any word that formed part of the name. The deceased leader was given a new name after death that all were required to use, and specific synonyms were selected to replace the words composing his name for use in regular conversation; anyone who spoke the forbidden words would be harshly punished or in some instances executed.

=== Funeral rites ===
Some Betsimisaraka, principally those living around Maroantsetra, practice the famadihana reburial ceremony, although in a simpler form than that practiced in the Highlands. Coffins are placed in tombs only in southern Betsimisaraka; in the north, they are placed under outdoor shelters. While in mourning, women will unbraid their hair and stop wearing their akanjo, while men no longer wear a hat; the mourning period typically lasts two to four months depending on how closely related the individual was to the deceased.

=== Dance and music ===
The ceremonial dance music style most closely associated with the tromba among the Betsimisaraka is called basesa and is performed on accordion. The traditional basesa performed for tromba ceremonies uses kaiamba shakers to accentuate the rhythm; lyrics are always sung in local Betsimisaraka dialect. The accompanying dance is performed with arms to the sides of the body and heavy foot movements. Contemporary basesa, which has been popularized across the island, is performed using a modern drum kit and electric guitar and bass with keyboard or accordion accompaniment, and the associated dance style has been influenced by dances performed to sega and kwassa kwassa music from Reunion Island. Basesa is also performed by the Antandroy, but among Betsimisaraka the style is performed significantly more slowly. Another major musical style specific to the region is valse, Malagasy interpretations of traditional European seafarers' waltzes performed on accordion; this genre is never performed during tromba ceremonies.

== Language ==
The Betsimisaraka speak several dialects of the Malagasy language, which is a branch of the Malayo-Polynesian language group derived from the Barito languages, spoken in southern Borneo.

== Economy ==
A Betsimisarakian hen house and a rice barn in 1911, Fenerive. Photo by Walter Kaudern.

The Betsimisaraka economy remains largely agricultural, with many cultivating vanilla and rice. Manioc, sweet potatoes, beans, taro, peanuts and a variety of greens are also commonly cultivated; other staple crops include sugar cane, coffee, bananas, pineapples, avocado, breadfruit, mangoes, oranges and lychees. Cattle are not widely raised; more commonly, the Betsimisaraka may catch and sell river crabs, shrimp and fish, small hedgehogs, various local insects or wild boar and birds in the forest. They also produce and sell homemade sugarcane beer (betsa) and rum (toaka). The production of spices for culinary use and for distillation into perfumes remains a major economic activity, with a perfume distillery located in Fenoarivo Atsinanana. Gold, garnet and other precious stones are also mined and exported from the Betsimisaraka region.

== Bibliography ==
- Bradt, Hilary; Austin, Daniel (2007). Madagascar (9th ed.). Guilford, CT: The Globe Pequot Press Inc. ISBN 978-1-84162-197-5.
- Condra, Jill (2013). Encyclopedia of National Dress: Traditional Clothing Around the World. Los Angeles: ABC Clio. ISBN 978-0-313-37637-5.
- Ellis, Stephen (2014). The Rising of the Red Shawls. Cambridge, MA: Cambridge University Press. ISBN 9781107634893.
- Emoff, Ron (2002). Recollecting from the Past: Musical Practice and Spirit Possession on the East Coast of Madagascar. Middletown, CT: Wesleyan University Press. ISBN 9780819565006.
- Gennep, A.V. (1904). Tabou Et Totémisme à Madagascar (in French). Paris: Ernest Leroux. ISBN 978-5-87839-721-6.
- Nielssen, Hilde (2011). Ritual Imagination: A Study of Tromba Possession Among the Betsimisaraka in Eastern Madagascar. Leiden, The Netherlands: Brill. ISBN 9789004215245.
- Ogot, Bethwell A. (1992). Africa from the Sixteenth to the Eighteenth Century. Paris: UNESCO. ISBN 9789231017117.
- Shoup, John (2001). Ethnic Groups of Africa and the Middle East: An Encyclopedia. New York: ABC-CLIO. ISBN 9781598843620.
