= Timeline of piracy =

This is a timeline of the history of piracy.

- Piracy in ancient history
- Piracy in post-classical history
- 1560s
- 1570s
- 1580s
- 1590s
- 1600s
- 1610s
- 1620s
- 1630s
- 1640s
- 1650s
- 1660s
- 1670s
- 1680s
- 1690s: 1690 – 1691 – 1692 – 1693 – 1694 – 1695 – 1696 – 1697 – 1698 – 1699
- 1700s: 1700 – 1701 – 1702 – 1703 – 1704 – 1705 – 1706 – 1707 – 1708 – 1709
- 1710s: 1710 – 1711 – 1712 – 1713 – 1714 – 1715 – 1716 – 1717 – 1718 – 1719
- 1720s: 1720 – 1721 – 1722 – 1723 – 1724 – 1725 – 1726 – 1727 – 1728 – 1729
- 1730s: 1730 - 1731 - 1732
- 1740s
- 1750s
- 1760s
- 1770s
- 1780s
- 1790s
- 1800s
- 1810s: 1810 - 1811 - 1812 - 1813 - 1814 - 1815 - 1816 - 1817 - 1818 - 1819
- 1820s: 1820 – 1821 — 1822 - 1823 - 1824 - 1825 - 1826 - 1827 - 1828 - 1829
- 1830s: 1830 - 1831 - 1832 - 1833 - 1834 - 1835 - 1836 - 1837 - 1838 - 1839
- 1840s: 1840 - 1841 - 1842 - 1843 - 1844 - 1845 - 1846 - 1847 - 1848 - 1849
- 1850s
- 1860s
- 1870s
- 1880s
- 1890s
- 1900s
- 1910s
- 1920s
- 1930s
- 1940s
- 1950s
- 1960s
- 1970s
- 1980s
- 1990s:
- 2000s: 2000 – 2001 – 2002 – 2003 – 2004 – 2005 – 2006 – 2007 – 2008 – 2009
- 2010s
- 2020s: 2020 – 2021 – 2022 – 2023 – 2024 – 2025 – 2026 – 2027 – 2028 – 2029
