= 2025 in piracy =

2025 in piracy began with a 35% surge in sea piracy and armed robbery, according to the International Maritime Bureau (IMB), with 45 incidents during the first quarter of the year. Incidents rose by up to 50% over the previous year, with the highest number of reported incidents since 2020 during the first half of the year. 90 incidents of naval armed robbery and piracy were reported by June, according to the IMB. Attacks on ships in Asia rose sharply in the first quarter, with 42 incidents reported by ReCAAP. Six incidents of piracy were reported in the Gulf of Guinea during the same period, with 13 crew kidnapped. While attacks remained on the rise in 2025, crew injuries were few; engine spares were the most reported theft aboard those vessels that were boarded by pirates.

The IMB reported that incidents of piracy had risen by 25% in Gulf of Guinea by the end of the third quarter of 2025. Overall, there was a nearly 50% rise in pirate attacks at sea over the previous year, increasing from 79 to 116 incidents during the same period, in which there were nine attempts to board vessels, with 102 ships boarded, four hijacked, and one fired upon. While under attack, 43 crew members were taken hostage, 16 were kidnapped, seven were threatened, with three assaulted and three injured. The Singapore Strait had a marked increase in piracy, with 73 incidents, curtailed by the arrests of two gangs by Indonesian police, in July.

== Attacks and events ==
=== Liao Dong Yu 57 ===
In January 2025 the Liao Dong Yu 57 and its crew were released by hijackers (who had commandeered the vessel the previous November), after Chinese Ambassador Wang Yu delivered a $2 million ransom. The hijackers stated that "We are not pirates. We are a community under siege." (One year later, on January 1, 2026, the same vessel was again reported hijacked while it illegally fished the same waters.)

=== Talara ===
The Marshall Islands-flagged Talara was seized by the Islamic Revolutionary Guard Corps (IRGC) in the Strait of Hormuz on November 14, which diverted the oil products tanker to its territorial waters from the United Arab Emirates' coast, alleging "unauthorised cargo". The Talara had been en route to Singapore from the UAE port of Sharjah, carry a cargo of high-sulphur gasoil, a form of diesel fuel. The vessel is owned by Pasha Finance of Cypress, and managed by Columbia Shipmanagement, a Schoeller company. The IRGC released the tanker on November 19, without charge or any allegations, and all 21 crew found safe.

== See also ==
- Red Sea crisis
- Maritime Security Patrol Area
- Singapore Strait
- Piracy in the Strait of Malacca
- Piracy in the Persian Gulf
- Piracy off the coast of Somalia
- Piracy and armed robbery in the Singapore Strait
- Houthi attacks on commercial vessels
