= 1719 in piracy =

See also 1718 in piracy, 1720 in piracy, 1719 and Timeline of piracy.

== Events ==
- July 2 – The King's Pardon is no longer available.

=== Caribbean Sea ===
- Late February – Charles Vane's sloop is wrecked in the Bay of Honduras by a waterspout. Most of the pirates are drowned, and Vane is stranded on an island. He is rescued some weeks later, but is subsequently recognized and turned over to the constabulary in Jamaica.
- February – early May – John Rackham's pirates bury their treasure on the Island of Princes. They then await news of the King's Pardon, but are instead attacked by two English sloops out of Jamaica. Their ship Kingston is captured, but the pirates escape inland into Cuba.
- May – Rackham and his crew are belatedly granted the King's Pardon by Governor Woodes Rogers at New Providence.

=== South America ===
- September – Bartholomew Roberts' pirates overcome a Portuguese merchantman off Bahia and pillage 40,000 gold moidores and many jewels.
- November – Captain Robert Semple in the Flying King and Captain Robert Lane in the Queen Ann's Revenge attack Portuguese shipping off Brazil. A Portuguese man-of-war gives chase; Queen Anne's Revenge escapes but wrecks on the coast, while Flying King is driven ashore and 38 of the pirates are hanged.

=== Indian Ocean ===
- June–July – Captain Condent in the Flying Dragon arrives in Madagascar, rescuing some of Halsey's old crew.

=== West Africa ===
- February–March – Howell Davis makes an unsuccessful assault against the Portuguese fort on Maio in the Cape Verde islands.
- March 25 – June 27 – Edward England cruises from the Gambia River to Cape Corso in the full-rigged ship Royal James (formerly Pearll), capturing nine vessels en route, and recruiting 55 men into his crew. Four of the captured vessels are burnt, and two are commandeered to start new pirate crews.
- March – Howell Davis plunders Gambia Castle without the loss of a man, stealing £2,000 worth of bar gold. Davis then joins with Olivier Levasseur and Thomas Cocklyn to attack the fort on Bunce Island in Sierra Leone, driving the garrison away.
- April 1 – The Bird Galley is captured by Thomas Cocklyn's pirates in the mouth of the Rokel River in Sierra Leone, and her captain, William Snelgrave, taken prisoner by Cocklyn and his confederates, Howell Davis and Olivier Levasseur ("La Buse"). Snelgrave's account of his captivity will become one of the major primary sources on pirate life.
- May – Howell Davis sails eastward along the Guinea Coast from Sierra Leone to Anomabu, taking eight vessels, including the Princess, whose mate, Bartholomew Roberts, is forced to join the pirates. Another of the victims is a thirty-gun Dutch ship, which Davis commandeers and renames the Rover. A third contains the Dutch governor of Accra, and yields over £15,000 in booty.
- Summer – Captain England attacks two ships in the roadstead of Cape Coast Castle with a fire ship, but is beaten off. England's men then careen and stay in an African town, and provoking a conflict with the inhabitants, the pirates attack and set the town afire. England then sails for Madagascar.
- June – Howell Davis ransacks a French ship in the harbor of Príncipe. He then tries to kidnap the Portuguese governor of Príncipe, but is found out and killed in an ambush. His men elect Bartholomew Roberts to succeed him. Roberts and his pirates attack the governor's castle, drive away the garrison, dismount the cannon, and burn the castle. They also burn two Portuguese ships in the harbor. Roberts then captures two vessels on the Guinea Coast, and sails for Brazil.

== Deaths ==
- June – Howell Davis, pirate captain.
- November – Robert Semple and Robert Lane, pirate captains.
