= 1990s in piracy =

This timeline of piracy in the 1990s is a chronological list of key events involving pirates between 1990 and 1999.

== Events ==
=== 1995 ===
- September 13 - The freighter Anna Sierra is boarded off the coast of Thailand after a group numbering 30 men overtook the ship in a motorboat. Heavily armed, the crew were forced to surrender and eventually set adrift in the ship's lifeboats. The pirates set sail for China and, repainting and refitting the ship within two days, arrived in Beihai where they used forged papers to sell the ship's cargo of sugar. The ship was eventually located following the crew's rescue and, after a legal battle between the ship's owners, the ship was beached at Beihai. The pirates, although held in Chinese custody, were not charged by authorities.

=== 1996 ===
- The London-based International Maritime Bureau reports approximately 224 acts of piracy.
- Several hours after leaving Singapore, the tanker Succi is attacked and boarded by several armed men and, setting the crew adrift in a lifeboat, successfully made their escape. Although the crew were later rescued, the tanker has not been recovered.
- Intersall, Inc., discovers an 18th-century shipwreck near Beaufort, North Carolina, believed to be Blackbeard's flagship, Queen Anne's Revenge.

=== 1997 ===
- May - A British couple sailing on a yacht were attacked by Albanian pirates, armed with assault rifles and grenades, while sailing around the Greek island of Corfu and robbed of valuables.

=== 1998 ===
- The London-based International Maritime Bureau reported worldwide acts of piracy had fallen to 198 as compared to 247 from the previous year as well as 67 deaths.
- The 23 crew members of the MV Cheung Son were murdered by pirates. Eventually captured by Chinese authorities, the 13 suspects were later executed.
- April – After seizing the Malaysian vessel Petro-Ranger, the pirates sailed to China where the ship was eventually stopped and impounded by authorities. The pirates on board were detained by Chinese authorities, and were later released four months later. 12 people were also charged by Indonesian authorities.
- September – The Japanese cargo ship Tenyu disappeared with a cargo of aluminium whilst en route from Indonesia to Korea. It was found three months later by Chinese authorities while docked at Zhangjiagang, its 14 crew members presumed dead.
- September – The United Kingdom abolished the death penalty for piracy.

=== 1999 ===
- April - The Cypriot-registered fuel tanker Valiant Carrier is hijacked in the Malacca Strait when pirates stormed the ship after throwing Molotov cocktails onto the deck. During the attack three of ship's officers are stabbed, as well a seven-month-old girl, before leaving the ship adrift. The crew is able to regain control of the ship, avoiding collision with a nearby island and preventing a massive oil spill.
- April 28 - Holding a ships officer hostage, a ship is robbed of $9,926 and the master's gold bangle after being boarded in Bangka Strait, Indonesia.
- June 8 - A ship bound for Songkhla, Thailand is boarded by pirates in two speedboats off the east coast of Malaysia and hijacked. While holding one crew member hostage, the remaining sixteen crewmen were forced into a lifeboat and set adrift, sailing away with 2,060 tons of gas oil before Chinese authorities eventually detained the ship.
- October 22 - The Japanese cargo ship Alondra Rainbow is attacked and boarded by ten pirates, eventually setting 17 crew members adrift on one of the ship's life rafts. Without food or water, the sailors drift on the open sea for more than a week before being rescued. The ship was later sighted by the Indian navy, which captured it after a two-day chase. 15 people were convicted, with one dying in custody, and the other 14 sentenced to six months to seven years imprisonment.

=== 2000 ===
- Treasure hunter Barry Clifford finds an early 18th-century wreck in the harbor of Île Sainte-Marie, Madagascar. Archaeologist John De Bry identifies the remains as those of the Fiery Dragon, Christopher Condent's pirate sloop. However, a UNESCO analysis of Clifford's discovery reported that Clifford had instead found an unrelated ship of Asian origin.
- February - Contact is lost with the cargo ship MV Hualien off the coast of Taiwan. Neither the ship nor its 21 crew members are found.
- February 23 - The Japanese tanker MT Global Mars, carryiang 6,000 metric tons of palm oil, is attacked off the coast of Malaysia by pirates armed with automatic weapons. The ships 18 crew members were held hostage for 10 days and set adrift in a small boat before being rescued off the coast of Thailand on March 10. The ship was located four months later near Hong Kong. It had been renamed and had to stop due to engine trouble. 20 people were arrested.

== See also ==
- Piracy in the 21st century, for subsequent events
- Timeline of piracy
