= 1600s in piracy =

This timeline of the history of piracy in the 1600s is a chronological list of key events involving pirates between 1600 and 1609.

== Events ==
=== 1600 ===
- April – Baltazar de Cordes captures the island of Chiloé along with Dutch and native forces.
- December 14 – Olivier van Noort and the Spanish engage in a naval combat off Fortune Island, forcing van Noort to quit piracy in the Philippines.
- Unknown – James Lancaster is given control of the East India Company's first fleet.
- Unknown – Walter Raleigh is sworn into office as governor of Jersey, an island off the coast of Normandy.

=== 1601 ===
- January – Baltazar de Cordes' ship along with the surviving crew get captured and imprisoned in Tidore, a Portuguese colony, after battling the Spanish in Chiloé.
- February – William Parker captures Portobello from the Spanish and sacks it.
- April 22 – The East India Company's first fleet sets sail from Torbay under the command of James Lancaster.
- May – Michael Geare captures three ships in the West Indies with David Middleton while commanding the Archangel but loses contact with one of the ships.
- August 26 – Olivier van Noort returns to Rotterdam captaining the Mauritius after battling the Spanish, making him the first Dutch person to circumnavigate the globe.
- September 9 – James Lancaster's fleet arrives in Table Bay in southern Africa, ravaged with scurvy.

=== 1602 ===
- December – Jan de Bouff gets ambushed by six Dutch ships but manages to capture two of them with the help of three other Dunkirkers.
- Unknown – Richard Hawkins is released after being imprisoned by Spain.
- Unknown – Peter Easton is put in command of a convoy as a privateer, commissioned by Elizabeth I, to protect the Newfoundland fishing fleet.

=== 1603 ===
- January 24 – Michael Geare and Christopher Newport, working with the French, direct eight ships during a landing of privateers near Santiago de Cuba but are eventually forced to flee.
- July – Richard Hawkins receives a knighthood.
- July 20 – By this date, Walter Raleigh has been imprisoned in the Tower of London after being accused of devising the Main Plot against James I.
- October – James Lancaster receives a knighthood from James I after returning from his voyage with the East India Company.

=== 1604 ===
- August 28 – The Treaty of London is signed and ends the nineteen-year Anglo-Spanish War.
- Unknown – Jack Ward is allegedly pressed into service for the British and is placed in the Channel Fleet aboard the Lyon's Whelp.

=== 1605 ===
- Unknown – Many Dutch and English sailors, including Richard Bishop and Anthony Johnson, join Jack Ward's crew.

=== 1606 ===
- April 10 – William Parker becomes a founding member of the Virginia Company.
- Summer – Jack Ward captures a dhow in the Strait of Gibraltar allegedly carrying Catholic slaves.
- Early November – Jack Ward captures the English merchantman John Baptist captained under John Keye and renames it Little John.
- Unknown – Hendrik Brouwer sails to the Dutch East Indies for the Dutch East India Company.

=== 1607 ===
- January 28 - Jack Ward takes the Venetian Carminati, one of his richest hauls.
- Unknown - Zymen Danseker steals a ship in Marseilles and sails to Algiers.

=== 1608 ===
- Unknown - Frances Verney leaves his wife and stepmother/mother-in-law after losing a case to them, headed for Morocco.

=== 1609 ===
- November 17 - Zymen Danseker returns to Marseilles and is pardoned upon return.
- Unknown - James Harris is ambushed by the British while stopping in Baltimore.

== Births ==
=== 1600 ===
- February 1 – Johan Evertsen

=== 1604 ===
- April 16 – Zheng Zhilong

=== 1607 ===
- Unknown - Ben Robins

=== 1609 ===
- Unknown - Richard Ingle

== Deaths ==
=== 1603 ===
- Unknown – Grace O'Malley of natural causes, though the exact date and cause is disputed.

=== 1609 ===
- Unknown – Murat Reis the Elder, during a siege of Vlorë.

== See also ==
- Timeline of piracy
- 1610s in piracy
