= 2023 in piracy =

2023 in piracy was marked by 120 events of maritime piracy against ships, according to the annual Piracy and Armed Robbery Report of the ICC International Maritime Bureau (IMB). 105 vessels were boarded, nine additional attacks attempted, two fired upon, and four vessels hijacked.

A resurgence of piracy off the coast of Somalia continued. The hijacking of the Ruen by Somali pirates was their first successful attack on commercial shipping tankers since 2017.

The Singapore Strait Gulf of Aden, Guardafui Channel and the Somali Sea were frequent targets of armed robbery, with the Gulf of Guinea reporting three of the four hijackings of the year. In December, Somali pirates waged four attacks on commercial ships.

Hijackings only slightly increased from the previous year, from 115 to 120, yet with greater numbers of crew taken hostage and kidnapped in 2023. The IMB called for heightened caution for crew safety, with kidnappings steeply increased from 2022. In 2023, crew kidnappings increased sharply from 41 to 73.

== Events ==
Pirate attacks of 2023 include events listed below; the list is not exhaustive.

=== Monjasa Reformer ===
On March 25, the Monjasa Reformer Liberian-flagged tanker was hijacked in the Gulf of Guinea, about 140 nautical miles from Pointe Noire, Congo. The vessel was found five days later. Six kidnapped crew members were recovered May 8.

=== Success 9 ===
On April 10, the Success 9 Singaporean-flagged tanker was boarded in the Gulf of Guinea, about 300 nautical miles (556 km) off Cote d’Ivoire, then found six days later off Abidjan.

=== MV Grebe Bulker ===
On May 2, bulk carrier MV Grebe Bulker, under the ensign of Marshall Islands, was boarded in the Port of Owendo, Gabon, resulting in a hostage situation. The ship's captain, second mate and third mate were kidnapped. The hostages were released after 18 days in captivity.

=== Galaxy Leader ===
On November 19, 2023, Galaxy Leader, en route from Körfez, Turkey to Pipavav, India, and flagged under the ensign of Bahamas, was hijacked by Houthis in the Red Sea. Armed hijackers boarded the vessel by military helicopter. 25 crew were kidnapped, still remaining in captivity as at April 21, 2024.

=== Al-Meraj 1 ===
On November 22, Somali pirates hijacked the Iranian-flagged fishing dhow Al-Meraj 1, about 62 nautical miles south of the Ras Hafun peninsula, near the Qandala district of Puntland, with links between the hijackers and the Qandala district commander and other senior officials implicated. The vessel was boarded by a Somali clan militia, demanding $400,000 ransom.

=== MV Central Park ===
On November 26, Liberian-flagged oil tanker MV Central Park was seized off the coast of Yemen in the Gulf of Aden. Multilateral anti-piracy task force CTF 151 conducted a VBSS operation, rescuing MV Central Park and capturing the hijackers, suspected Somali pirates. The ship's crew was unharmed.

=== MV Ruen ===
On December 14, the first successful commercial ship hijacking since 2017 occurred off the coast of Somalia. Maltese-flagged MV Ruen was captured by Somali pirates. 17 crew were kidnapped, MV Ruen was rescued March 16, 2024, by the Indian Air Force.

=== Emarat-2 ===
On December 22, 20 heavily armed Somali pirates hijacked a Yemeni fishing dhow, Emarat-2.

== See also ==
- Piracy in the 21st century
- Red Sea crisis—2023 Houthi attacks on commercial vessels
