= 1708 in piracy =

This article covers 1708 in piracy.

== Events ==
- The Parliament of Great Britain passes an act prohibiting the British government from accepting plunder taken by privateers.
- During his first voyage, Captain Woodes Rogers encounters marooned privateer Alexander Selkirk and rescues him after four years living on Juan Fernández Islands. After sacking Guayaquil, he and Selkirk would visit the Galapagos Islands.
- Kiljkover-al is attacked by French privateer Anthony Ferry with three ships and around 300 men. Ferry's fleet proceeds up the Essequibo River burning Indian villages along the way before anchoring opposite of Bartica. The commander of the local garrison offered a ransom of 50,000 gilders, which included slaves and goods along with 2,500 in cash.

== See also ==
- 1707 in piracy
- other events of 1708
- 1709 in piracy
- Timeline of piracy
