= 2022 in piracy =

2022 in piracy resulted in 115 reports of maritime piracy and armed robbery against ships to the International Maritime Bureau. 288 acts of global piracy and robbery were recorded by the MICA Centre. Piracy had substantially increased in the Gulf of Guinea; the year began with five incidents each month, through March, in the Gulf, where acts of piracy had become heightened during 2015 through 2020, while, overall, piracy incidents declined globally.

The COVID-19 pandemic continued to impact maritime piracy in 2022.

The Rwabee hijacking and hostage-taking in January had incentivized a return to coordinated naval anti-piracy measures on the Aden coast and in the Red Sea. In 2024, research would indicate that the United Nations Security Council resolution for foreign navies to patrol Somali territorial waters had lapsed, in March, 2022, with the need for it to continue being then unperceived.

Piracy and armed robbery in the Singapore Strait accounted for 65% of piracy incidents in Asia in 2022, according to the Regional Cooperation Agreement on Combating Piracy and Armed Robbery against Ships in Asia (ReCaap). The Caribbean was also among the most affected areas. The Strait saw an increase in piracy, accounting for close to 30% of incidents, as did Asia's, Celebs and Sulu Seas, Manila anchorages, and in the disputed waters of the eastern Sabah coast in Asia.

Efforts to reduce piracy off the coast of Somalia appeared to have succeeded, with no ship hijackings for ransom since March 2017. Globally, incidents of piracy and armed robbery at anchor or at sea were at their lowest levels since 1992, with the vast majority of events occurring at night, under cover of darkness.

The United Nations published The situation with respect to piracy and armed robbery at sea off the coast of Somalia in November.

India enacted its first domestic anti-piracy legislation as the Maritime Anti-Piracy Act 2022, criminalizing maritime piracy and empowering Indian agencies with the authority to respond to threats.

Sea piracy by cyberattack using ransomware had also become a growing threat to shipping companies.

== Events ==
Pirate attacks of 2022 include events listed below; the list is not exhaustive.

=== B Ocean ===
B Ocean tanker was stolen by pirates twice in 2022, first, in January, and then, again, in November. Flagged by the Marshall Islands, the tanker was boarded by eight armed pirates about 274 nautical miles south of Côte d'Ivoire, in November, who stole the ship's petroleum and damaged the vessel, before releasing ship and crew.

=== MV Rwabee ===
On January 3, MV Rwabee was hijacked by Houthis in the Red Sea. The UAE-flagged cargo ship was said to be transporting civilian medical supplies. Hostages, including 11 crew, were released in April.

=== US Saildrone Explorer ===
During August 29–30, a support ship from Iran's Islamic Revolutionary Guard Corps Navy (IRGCN) attempted to capture a U.S. Navy unmanned surface vessel in the Persian Gulf. Shahid Baziar continued towing the Saildrone Explorer for about four hours before releasing it, while being shadowed and radioed by the USS Thunderbolt.
