= 2024 in piracy =

2024 in piracy was reported by the International Maritime Bureau (IMB) division of the International Chamber of Commerce (ICC) as including 116 maritime piracy and armed robbery incidents against ships. 94 vessels were boarded by pirates, six of which were hijacked.

Piracy surged in the Gulf of Aden at the start of the year. Increased incidents of piracy and hijacking in the Somali basin continued to be reported. When Houthis began attacking international shipping in the Red Sea, the year before, Somali pirates seized the opportunity to increase their attacks on ships off the Horn of Africa.

Houthi attacks on ships in the Red Sea extended beyond the Gaza war to, as stated by a Houthi spokesman in January 2024, response to "American-British aggression against our country". US Central Command then stated that the Houthi attacks "have nothing to do with the conflict in Gaza" and that Houthis had "fired indiscriminately into the Red Sea" to target vessels, affecting more than 40 nations.

In March, shipping routes reported as the most dangerous in the world due to piracy (aside from hijackings and other incidents in the Red Sea and Gulf of Aden related to the Gaza war) were identified as: the Singapore Strait, Gulf of Guinea and the Strait of Malacca. 33 maritime piracy and armed robbery incidents against ships—during which 35 seafarers were taken hostage, and nine were kidnapped—were recorded in the first quarter of the year.

From November 2023 to June 2024, more than 50 ships were attacked by Houthi rebels, resulting in the deaths of three sailors, and a hijacking. US military responded to the missile strikes in the Arabian and Red Seas with a series of attacks on the rebels' radar sites, which facilitated the targeting of maritime vessels; US Central Command reported seven radar sites destroyed in June.

On 12 June, Houthi militants launched their first unmanned, remote-controlled USVs laden with explosives, sinking the MV Tutor, and killing one Filipino crewman. The following month, armed private maritime security contractors destroyed another Houthi drone boat as it approached the (unidentified) merchant ship that they were aboard.

In September, the ICC IMB reported that sea piracy and armed robbery incidents were at the lowest levels recorded since 1994, though related crew safety risks persisted, due to sharp increases in kidnappings and in violence toward crew, as reported in July.

While multilateral naval operations, increased vessel security, and improved navigation systems were generally enhanced, geopolitical tensions became an increasingly likely source of piracy incidents. Piracy events are noted as most common near the West African coast, in the Malacca Strait, and in the South China Sea in 2024.

== Attacks and events ==
Pirate attacks of 2024 include events listed below; the list is not exhaustive.

=== INS Sumitra ===
On January 29, the INS Sumitra rescued a hijacked fishing boat from Somalian pirates in the Gulf of Aden.

=== MV Abdullah ===
On March 12, armed pirates in small boats attacked Bangladesh-flagged bulk carrier MV Abdullah. All 23 crew members aboard were taken hostage. Somali pirates released the vessel and crew on April 14, following payment of $5 million (€4.7 million) ransom.

=== MV Ruen ===
On March 16, MV Ruen, following its hijacking in the Arabian Sea, approximately 380 nautical miles east of Socotra, Yemen in December 2023, was rescued by the Indian Air Force, which airdropped two rigid inflatable combat boats carrying eight Indian Navy MARCOS commandos, rescuing 17 sailors and disarming 35 pirates on board. Later that month, India escorted the captured Somali pirates to stand trial for the hijacking the vessel and kidnapping of its crew in Mumbai.

=== Magalie ===
On April 4, the Panama-flagged Magalie was attacked in the Caribbean by two Haitian gangs: 5 Seconds and Taliban (unrelated to the Afghan Taliban). The Magalie was captured by the armed gangs in the Varreux fuel terminal at Port-Au-Prince. The crew was taken hostage and a sixth of the cargo, consisting entirely of rice (the primary staple food of Haiti), was stolen. On April 7, the Haitian National Police stormed the seized freighter, ensuing in a five-hour gun battle with the gangs, in which two police officers were injured and several of the two gang's members turned pirate were killed. The ship, owned by U.S. shipping company Claude and Magalie, was recovered by the Haitian police force. The fate of the crew and any other seafarers aboard the Magalie, who were all taken hostage, remained as hostages, having been separated from their vessel prior.

=== Al-Kambar 786 ===
On March 28, Al-Kambar 786, was boarded by nine armed pirates southwest of the Yemeni island of Socotra. INS Sumedha and INS Trishul intercepted the vessel on March 29. The Indian Navy engaged in "over 12 hours of intense coercive tactical measures" that led to the pirates' surrender. The crew was unharmed. The pirates were taken to India to face prosecution under its Maritime Anti-Piracy Act 2022.

=== MV Tutor ===
Dry-bulk carrier MV Tutor was attacked in the Red Sea off Eritrea by the first seafaring Houthi unmanned, remote-controlled drone boat which was laden with explosives, on 12 June 2024, following two attacks a few hours apart, sinking on 18 June.

=== Royal TB 17 ===
An Indonesia-flagged tugboat, Royal 17, while towing a barge between ports on the island of Kalimantan in Borneo was hijacked and robbed on 20 September. All 14 crew were taken hostage and individually robbed by five armed and masked pirates, who also stole various equipment as well as cargo.

=== Cordelia Moon ===
Mistaken by Houthis as a British ship, Panama-flagged Cordelia Moon was hit by four missiles fired from a remotely piloted watercraft in the Red Sea on October 1, 2024. The tanker is owned by Amber Shipping Incorporated, and managed by Margao Marine Solutions, which is registered in India.

=== Liao Dong Yu 57 ===
In November 2024, protesting foreign boats fishing nearby waters, a group of "angry young local men in coastal communities" hijacked the Liao Dong Yu 578, part of a fleet known for illegal fishing off the coast. The vessel and crew were released in January 2025, after Chinese Ambassador Wang Yu delivered a $2 million ransom.

== See also ==
- Red Sea crisis—2024 Houthi attacks on commercial vessels
