= 1717 in piracy =

== Events ==
=== Caribbean Sea ===
- January – HMS Scarborough bombards and destroys several pirate vessels careening on St. Croix, stranding the pirate crew.
- Late February – Samuel Bellamy in the Sultana takes the Whydah Gally near Jamaica and keeps it for his own use.
- April 1 – Benjamin Hornigold and a pirate named Napping capture a large armed sloop, the Bennet, out of Jamaica.
- April 4 – At Bluefield's Bay in Jamaica, Hornigold and Napping capture the sloop Revenge carrying a load of Spanish gold.
- September 29 – "Gentleman Pirate" Stede Bonnet, who has traded plantation life for a pirate ship, transfers command of his sloop, the Revenge, to Blackbeard.
- November 28 – Blackbeard captures the French slave ship La Concorde near Martinique, equips her with 40 guns, and renames her the Queen Anne's Revenge.
- December 10 – Blackbeard overtakes and ransacks the merchant sloop Margaret off the coast of Anguilla near Crab Island.

=== North America ===
- Spring – Edward Teach and Benjamin Hornigold take two sloops to Virginia, robbing three vessels en route, then return to Nassau, Bahamas.
- April – Bellamy seizes a merchant vessel off South Carolina.
- April 26 – The Whydah Gally wrecks in a nor'easter off Cape Cod, Massachusetts; Bellamy and 143 men are drowned. Over 4 tons of treasure is lost under just 14 feet (4.3 m) of water – it would elude discovery for over 260 years.
- July – Stede Bonnet's pirates in the Revenge plunder the Anne, Turbet, Endeavour, and Young off the coast of Virginia, burning the Turbet.
- August – Bonnet raids two vessels off South Carolina, firing one.
- October – Edward Teach and Stede Bonnet raid shipping in the mouth of Delaware Bay.
- October 12 – Blackbeard captures a Captain Codd and his vessel off the Delaware capes. He later captures and loots the Spofford and Sea Nymph.
- October 22 – Blackbeard, on the Revenge, stops and plunders the Robert and Good Intent of their cargo.
- November 5 – The surviving Whydah Gally pirates are hung in Boston.

=== Europe ===
- September 5 – King George I of Great Britain issues a royal decree, known as the Act of Grace, pardoning all pirates who surrender to the appointed authorities by 5 September 1718.

== Deaths ==
- April 27 – Samuel Bellamy, pirate commander captain (born February 23, 1689, aged 28), along with 143 of his crew.

== See also ==
- 1716 in piracy
- 1717 for other events
- 1718 in piracy
- Timeline of piracy
