= 1715 in piracy =

See also 1714 in piracy, other events in 1715, 1716 in piracy, and Timeline of piracy.

== Events ==
=== Caribbean Sea ===
- December, 27th- Henry Jennings and five vessels from the Bahamas (including Charles Vane's) attack Spanish salvage teams recovering the remains of the Spanish 1715 Treasure Fleet, plundering 350,000 pieces of eight. Threatened with prosecution by Jamaica governor Lord Archibald Hamilton on account of their piracy, Jennings and his men reoccupy the abandoned island of New Providence in the Bahamas.
- Undated - Spanish forces attack and disperse logwood cutters at Campeche and British Honduras; many of the ousted loggers turn pirate.

== Deaths ==
- William Dampier, buccaneer and triple world-circumnavigator (born 1651).
