= 1720 in piracy =

See also 1719 in piracy, 1721 in piracy and Timeline of piracy.

== Events ==
=== Caribbean Sea ===
- February - Bartholomew Roberts robs four vessels near Barbados.
- February 26 - Two pirate ships commanded by Bartholomew Roberts and Montigny la Palisse are attacked near Barbados by local ships and driven away with heavy casualties.
- March - Two sloops sent from Martinique to capture Roberts and his men arrive too late to capture the pirates, who have sailed northward. Roberts adopts a new flag threatening death to the inhabitants of Barbados and Martinique.
- August - John Rackham steals John Ham's sloop William from the harbor of Nassau, Bahamas and leads a crew of pirates to sea, including Anne Bonny and Mary Read.
- September - Rackham and his pirates loot several fishing boats in the Bahamas. They then raid French Hispaniola for cattle and capture two sloops.
- Roberts returns to the Caribbean, bombards Saint Kitts and burns two ships in the harbor. Some weeks later, Roberts captures a French ship near Carriacou and commandeers it, renaming it the Royal Fortune.
- October - Pirates under Rackham's leadership ransack several vessels off northern Jamaica.
- October - Rackham and his crew are captured by a merchant sloop commanded by Jonathan Barnet. After the William's boom is damaged, the pirates make no resistance.
- November - Rackham and his crew are tried, sentenced and hanged. Rackham and two others are gibbetted. Read and Bonny are tried and sentenced (execution delayed due to claimed pregnancy).

=== Indian Ocean ===
- Undated - Edward England ravages the Malabar Coastal shipping, taking one Dutch vessel and an unknown number of Indian hulls.
- October - Captain Condent captures an Arab ship off Bombay, stealing approximately £150,000 worth of cash and cargo.
- November 20, 1720 - Captain England in the Fancy and Captain Olivier Levasseur alias "la Buse" attack Captain James Macrae in the East Indiaman Cassandra near Anjouan in the Comoros. Macrae is ultimately forced aground after a bloody battle.
- November–December - Captain England and some of his friends are marooned by their pirate crew, who elect John Taylor to replace him.

=== North America ===
- June 21 - Bartholomew Roberts invades the harbor of Trepassey, Newfoundland, plundering 22 vessels and burning all but one.
- July - Roberts captures nine or ten French vessels off the Grand Banks and commandeers a new ship, the 26-gun Fortune. Aboard the Fortune, Roberts proceeds to take ten English vessels, then sails back toward the Caribbean.

=== West Africa ===
- October–November - Roberts in the Royal Fortune tries to reach the Cape Verde Islands, but misses his landfall and is forced back to the West Indies by the trade wind. A shortage of water kills many of his pirates.

== Deaths ==
- November 18 - John Rackham hanged for piracy at Gallows Point, Port Royal, Jamaica.
