= Piracy in the 21st century =

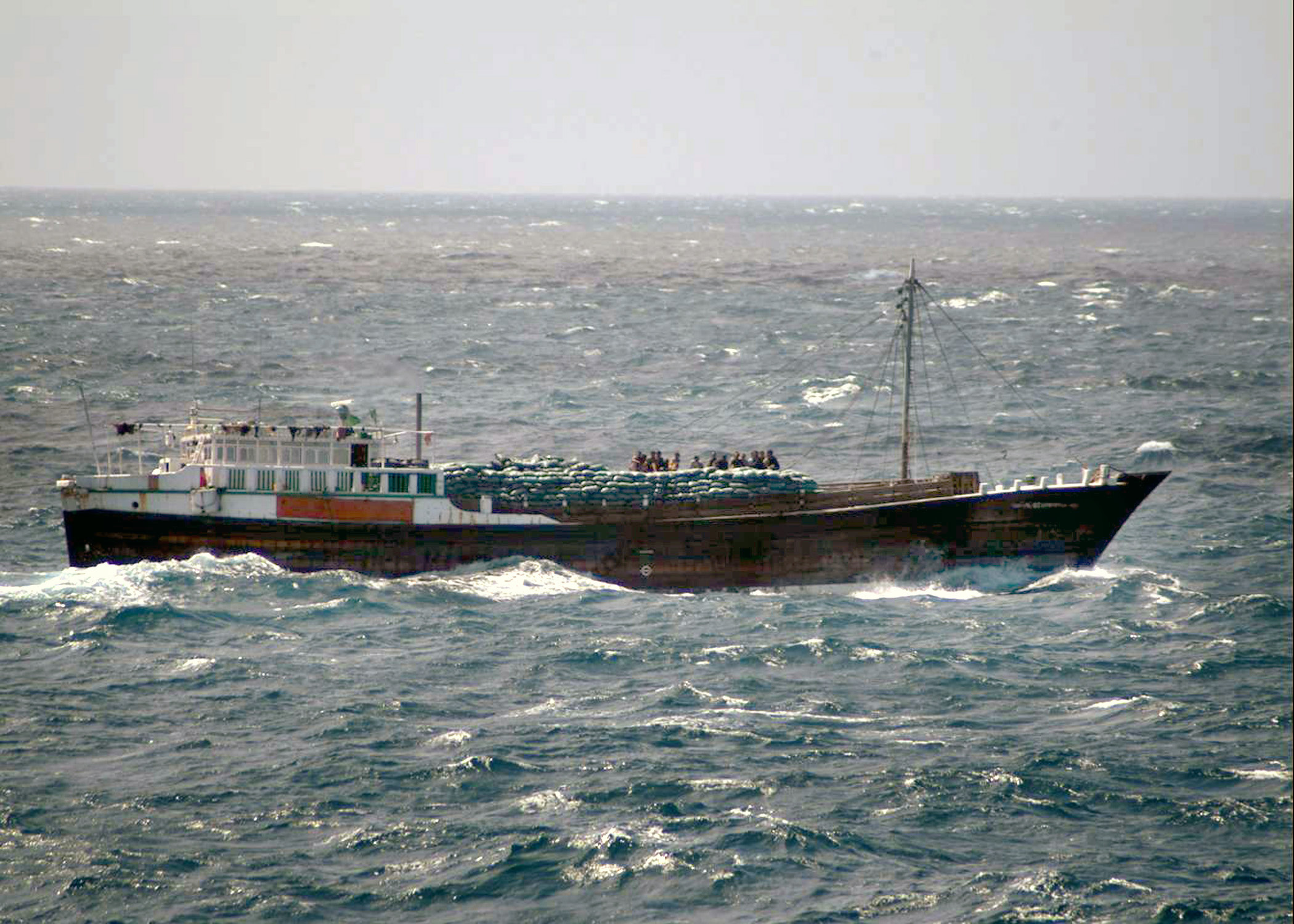
Suspected pirates assemble on the deck of a dhow near waters off of western Malaysia, January 2006.

Piracy in the 21st century (commonly known as modern piracy) has taken place in a number of waters around the globe, including but not limited to, the Gulf of Guinea, Gulf of Aden, Arabian Sea, Strait of Malacca, Sulu and Celebes Seas, Indian Ocean, Bay of Bengal and Falcon Lake, Morobe Bay.

Piracy in maritime law is defined in the United Nations Convention on the Law of the Sea as "any illegal acts of violence or detention, or any act of depredation, committed for private ends by the crew or the passengers of a private ship or a private aircraft" outside the jurisdiction of any State, such as on the high seas. It typically involves armed pirates boarding a vessel and either kidnapping the crew for ransom or stealing goods always with the goal of making money.

== Waters ==
=== Caribbean ===
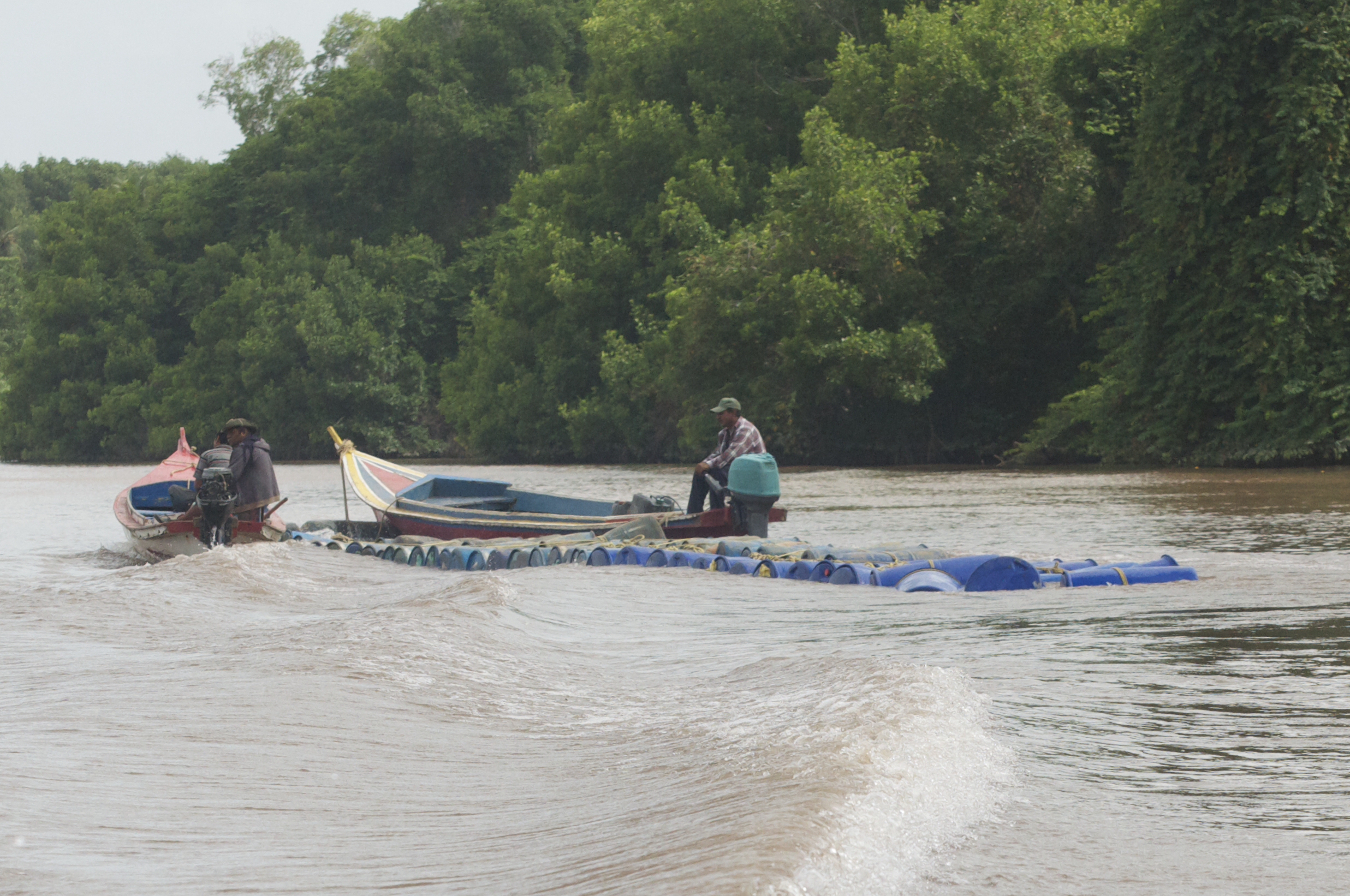
Gasoline smuggling in the Limón River, Zulia state, Venezuela

Due to the crisis in Bolivarian Venezuela, issues of piracy returned to the Caribbean in the 2010s, with the increase in pirate activity being compared to piracy off the coast of Somalia given their similar socioeconomic origins. In 2016, many former fishermen turned to piracy, initially in the state of Sucre, where attacks occurred daily, often resulting in multiple killings. By 2018, as Venezuelans became more desperate, fears arose that Venezuelan pirates might spread throughout Caribbean waters. Many may have turned to piracy due to larger ships from other countries entering the waters of low-income countries to exploit resources like fish. Since many residents of such countries rely on fishing as their primary source of income, the depletion of aquatic resources like fish caused by these larger ships often leaves local fishermen without any means of livelihood once the ships depart permanently.

=== Falcon Lake ===
Falcon Lake is a 100-kilometre long (60 mi) reservoir constructed in 1954 along the border between the United States and Mexico that serves as a known drug smuggling route.

A turf war between rival drug cartels for control of the lake began in March 2010, resulting in a series of armed robberies and shooting incidents. All attacks were attributed to the Los Zetas cartel, occurring primarily on the Mexican side of the reservoir but within sight of the Texas shoreline. These so-called pirates operate "fleets" of small boats used to target fishermen and smuggle drugs.

While these events are commonly referred to as piracy, all waters of Falcon Lake are classified as either U.S. or Mexican territorial waters. As such, these activities do not meet the technical definition of piracy under Article 101 of the UN Convention on the Law of the Sea.

=== Gulf of Guinea ===
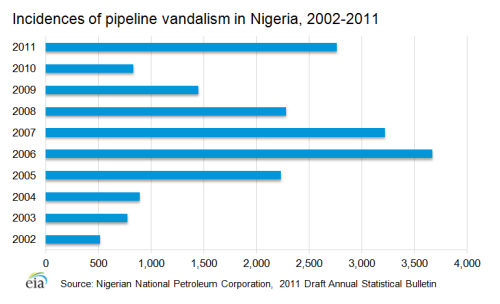
Incidents of pipeline vandalism by pirates in the Gulf of Guinea, 2002–2011

Piracy in the Gulf of Guinea affects numerous countries in West Africa and has significant implications for the broader international community. By 2011, it had become a global concern. Pirates operating in the Gulf of Guinea are often part of heavily armed criminal enterprises that uses violent methods to steal oil cargo. In 2012, the International Maritime Bureau, Oceans Beyond Piracy, and the Maritime Piracy Humanitarian Response Program reported that had carried out the highest number of vessel attacks globally, with 966 seafarers affected that year.

Over the first decade of the 21st century, Piracy in the Gulf of Guinea has evolved significantly. Initially, smaller ships transporting employees and materials for oil companies involved in exploration were the primary targets in Nigeria. Over time, however, pirates grew more aggressive and better equipped. By 2014, most pirate attacks in West Africa occurred in territorial waters, terminals, and harbors rather than on the high seas. This attack pattern has complicated intervention efforts by international naval forces.

Pirates in the Gulf of Guinea operate within a well-funded and organized criminal industry, supported by established supply networks. Increasingly, they utilize motherships to launch attacks, enhancing their operational range and efficiency. Their primary aim is to steal oil cargo, with limited interest in holding crew members or non-oil vessels and cargo for ransom. Notably, pirates in this region are infamous for their violent methods, which often involve kidnapping, torture, and the shooting of crew members. This violent approach is believed to be part of a deliberate "business model" that relies on intimidation and brutality to achieve its objectives.

By 2010, 45 incidents of piracy had been reported to the UN International Maritime Organization, rising to 120 incidents by 2012. However, many attacks remain unreported. These acts of piracy disrupt legitimate trade interests of affected countries, including Benin, Togo, Ivory Coast, Ghana, Nigeria, and the Democratic Republic of Congo. For instance, trade through Benin’s main port, the Port of Cotonou, reportedly declined by 70% in 2012 due to piracy. The economic cost of piracy in the Gulf of Guinea, encompassing stolen goods, security measures, and insurance expenses, has been estimated at approximately $2 billion.

According to the Control Risks Group, pirate attacks in the Gulf of Guinea had maintained a steady rate of around 100 attempted hijackings by mid-November 2013, ranking the region third globally for piracy incidents, behind Southeast Asia.

=== Indian Ocean ===
Extent of pirate attacks on shipping vessels in the Indian Ocean between 2005 and 2010

Piracy in the Indian Ocean has posed a threat to international shipping since the onset of the Somali Civil War in the early 1990s. By 2005, many international organizations have raised concerns about the increasing number of pirate attacks. These acts of piracy disrupt the delivery of shipments, escalated shipping costs, and caused an estimated $6.6 to $6.9 billion in annual losses to global trade, according to Oceans Beyond Piracy (OBP). The German Institute for Economic Research (DIW) noted that an industry of profiteers emerged around the piracy crisis. Insurance companies, for instance, saw significant profit increase as they raised premium rates in response to the heightened risks.

The fight against piracy in the Indian Ocean was spearheaded by Combined Task Force 150, a multinational coalition task force, that established the Maritime Security Patrol Area (MSPA) within the Gulf of Aden and the Guardafui Channel. By September 2012, the peak of piracy in the region was reportedly over. The International Maritime Bureau noted that pirate attacks had dropped to a six-year low by October 2012, with only one ship attacked during the third quarter compared to thirty-six during the same period in 2011.

By December 2013, the U.S. Office of Naval Intelligence reported that pirates had attacked only 9 vessels that year, with no successful hijackings. Control Risks attributed this 90% decline in pirate activity from 2012 levels to several factors: the adoption of best management practices by ship owners and crews, the deployment of armed private security personnel on board vessels, the presence of significant naval forces, and the development of onshore security forces.

In 2026, pirate groups in Somalia took advantage of the Iran war and the crisis in the region to launch hijackings, with three ships hijacked off Somalia and nearby Yemen in the span of three weeks during May 2026 driving up insurance, transit times and security costs, putting new pressure on global supply chains.

On 1 May 2026, during the 2026 Strait of Hormuz crisis, president of the US Donald Trump announced that the US navy is operating in the area "like pirates", saying: “We land on top of it and we took over the ship. We took over the cargo, took over the oil. It’s a very profitable business", also saying that "We're like pirates. We're sort of like pirates but we are not playing games".

=== Strait of Malacca ===
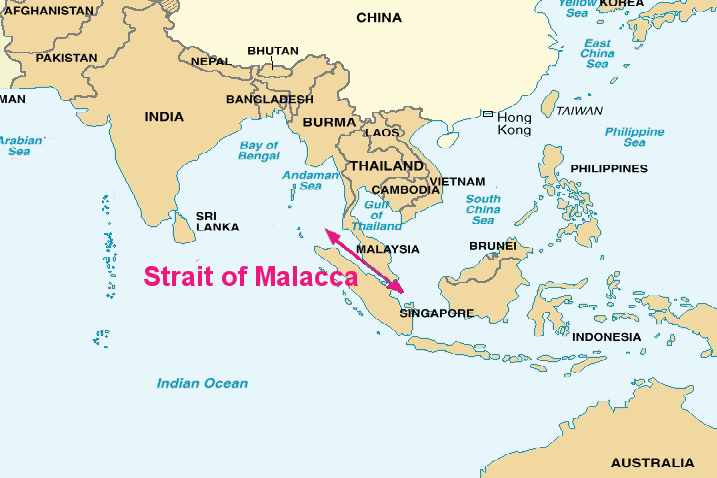
The Strait of Malacca has been a major area of pirate activity.

Pirates in the Strait of Malacca near Indonesia are typically armed with guns, knives, or machetes. They often carry out their attacks at night, targeting ships either underway or at anchor. If a vessel sounds an alarm, the pirates usually retreat without engaging the crew. Similarly, in the Singapore Straits, pirates conduct nighttime attacks on ships that are either anchored or in transit.

By mid-November 2013, the Control Risks Group, reported that pirate attacks in the Strait of Malacca had reached a global high, surpassing the number of incidents in the Gulf of Guinea.

=== Sulu and Celebes Seas ===
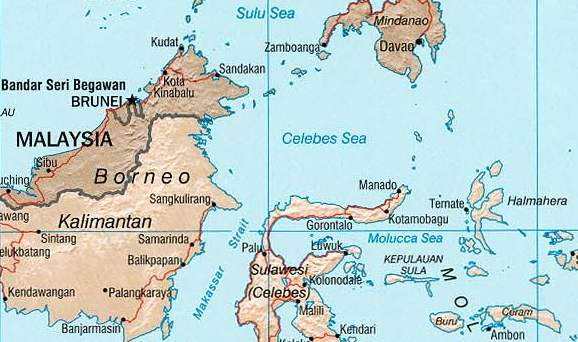
Sulu and Celebes Seas

The Sulu and Celebes Seas, a semi- enclosed and porous maritime region spanning approximately 1 million square kilometers, have been hotspots for illegal activities since the pre-colonial era. These waters continue to pose significant maritime security threats to neighboring nations.

In recent years, the abduction of crew members has become the most prevalent illegal activity in the area, with many incidents attributed to the violent extremist group Abu Sayyaf. Since March 2016, the Information Sharing Centre (ISC) of the Regional Cooperation Agreement on Combating Piracy and Armed Robbery against Ships in Asia (ReCAAP) has reported a total of 86 abductions. This has prompted the issuance of warnings to ships traversing the region.

== Notable occurrences ==
Image	Flag (owner)	Name (class)	Crew (cargo)	Status	Date of attack	Coordinates
Image	Flag (owner)	Name (class)	Crew (cargo)	Status	Date of release	Ransom demanded
	Bangladesh	Dilruba (Fishing)	unknown (unknown)	Attacked	February 2001	unknown
	Bangladesh	Dilruba (Fishing)	unknown (unknown)	Attacked	n/a	n/a
Boarded off Patharghata. In a gun fight leaving one crew member wounded, the pirates stole supplies worth $139,373.
	Panama	Lingfield (Tanker)	unknown (classified)	Attacked	March 7, 2001	unknown
	Panama	Lingfield (Tanker)	unknown (classified)	Attacked	n/a	n/a
Attacked near Bintan, Indonesia and boarded by eight pirates who, after tying up and blindfolding the ship's three senior officers, stole $11,000 from the ship's safe.
	Panama	Jasper (Cargo)	unknown (unknown)	Attacked	March 9, 2001	unknown
	Panama	Jasper (Cargo)	unknown (unknown)	Attacked	n/a	n/a
Looted of $11,000 off the coast of Kosichang, Thailand by what was suspected to be members of a Thailand organized crime organization.
	Indonesia	Inabukwa (Cargo)	unknown (unknown)	Attacked	March 15, 2001	unknown
	Indonesia	Inabukwa (Cargo)	unknown (unknown)	Attacked	(2 weeks later)	n/a
Boarded off the coast of Malaysia and, after marooning the crew on a nearby uninhabited island, the pirates escaped with the ship's cargo of tin ingots and pepper valued at $2,170,000. The ship was recovered by Filipino authorities two weeks later, following the arrest of the pirates.
	Panama	Marine Universal (Cargo)	unknown (unknown)	Attacked	May 2001	unknown
	Panama	Marine Universal (Cargo)	unknown (unknown)	Attacked	n/a	n/a
Boarded by four pirates while at an anchorage in Lagos Harbor, Nigeria. Armed with long knives, they took one sailor hostage, and later threw him overboard.
Infrared photograph of the Maersk Alabama while it was being hijacked	United States	Maersk Alabama (Cargo)	23 (17,000 metric tons)	Hostages rescued	2009-04-08	unknown
Infrared photograph of the Maersk Alabama while it was being hijacked	United States	Maersk Alabama (Cargo)	23 (17,000 metric tons)	Hostages rescued	2009-04-12	n/a
Boarded by four pirates while en route to Mombasa, who attacked from another hijacked vessel. After a prolonged struggle with the crew, the pirates escaped the ship via lifeboat with the captain, Richard Phillips. Philips was rescued from the lifeboat three days later by US Navy SEALs, who killed three pirates. A fourth pirate, Abduwali Muse, was detained and convicted of hijacking and kidnapping in the United States.
	Italy	MSC Melody (Cruise ship)	unknown (unknown)	Attacked	2009-04-25	unknown
	Italy	MSC Melody (Cruise ship)	unknown (unknown)	Attacked	n/a	n/a
About 800 kilometres (500 mi) off the coast of Somalia, pirates tried to attack an Italian cruise ship carrying nearly 1,500 people in 2009. An Israeli security team had been contracted to protect the cruise liner. Security personnel returned fire when the pirates started firing at the ship. The presence of a security team caused the pirates to turn around and abandon the attack.
	Thailand	MV Prantalay 11, 12, and 14 (Commercial fishing boat)	unknown (unknown)	Hijacked	2010	unknown
	Thailand	MV Prantalay 11, 12, and 14 (Commercial fishing boat)	unknown (unknown)	Hijacked	n/a	n/a
The attack took place near the EEZ of India; however, the pirates took the boats and fisherman back to Somalia. The pirates held them for ransom until they received what they had asked for.
	United States	SY Quest (Sail boat)	unknown (unknown)	Hijacked	2011	unknown
	United States	SY Quest (Sail boat)	unknown (unknown)	Hijacked	n/a	n/a
In February 2011 Somali pirates killed four American hostages. The pirates hijacked a sail boat from the Arabian Sea and took the people aboard hostage, including a retired couple from California. When the US Navy got too close, the pirates panicked and shot the hostages. A navy spokesperson said they did not understand why the hostages would be killed, when the pirates' motive is to hold hostages for ransom.
	Bahamas (Isle of Man)	Galaxy Leader (Cargo)	unknown (unknown)	Hijacked	2023	unknown
	Bahamas (Isle of Man)	Galaxy Leader (Cargo)	unknown (unknown)	Hijacked	(ongoing)	n/a
In November 2023 during the Gaza war, Yemeni Houthis hijacked a Japanese-operated, British-owned cargo ship in the Red Sea, by landing on top of the deck from a helicopter. The Houthis claimed the ship was Israeli, a claim that Israel denied.
	Liberia (Monaco)	Central Park (Tanker)	22 (phosphoric acid)	Hijacked	26 November 2023	unknown
	Liberia (Monaco)	Central Park (Tanker)	22 (phosphoric acid)	Hijacked	26 November 2023	n/a
In November 2023, amid the Gaza war, the Central Park, a tanker ship owned by Zodiac Maritime, was attacked in the Gulf of Aden by suspected Somali pirates. The crew of the USS Mason (DDG-87) came to the Central Park's assistance and captured five pirates.

== See also ==
- Copyright infringement, sometimes called piracy
- Piracy by year

By region or body of water

- Piracy around the Horn of Africa
- Piracy in the British Virgin Islands
- Piracy in the Caribbean
- Piracy in the Gulf of Guinea
- Piracy in the Persian Gulf
- Piracy in the Singapore Strait
- Piracy in the Strait of Malacca
- Piracy off the coast of Somalia
- Piracy on Falcon Lake
