= 1630s in piracy =

This timeline of the history of piracy in the 1630s is a chronological list of key events involving pirates between 1630 and 1639.

== Events ==
=== 1631 ===
- June 20 - Murat Reis the Younger executes the Sack of Baltimore where he captured 108 English planters and local Irish people. Almost all the villagers were put in irons and taken to a life of slavery in North Africa.
- December - Frances Knight is captured by Algerian corsairs and forced into slavery.
- Unknown - The Franco-Moroccan Treaty is signed between Louis XIII and Abu Marwan Abd al-Malik II, with contributions by Murat Reis the Younger.

=== 1633 ===
- August 12 - Cornelis Jol attacks Campeche, then owned by Spain.
- October 22 - Zheng Zhilong defeats a fleet of Dutch East India Company vessels in the Battle of Liaoluo Bay.
- Unknown - Samuel Axe, Abraham Blauvelt, and Sussex Cammock leave New Providence and sail for Honduras.

=== 1635 ===
- Unknown - Murat Reis the Younger is captured near the Tunisian coast by the Knights of Malta then subsequently imprisoned and tortured.

=== 1636 ===
- February 29 - Jacob Collaert and Mathieu Romboutsen were captured by Johan Evertsen after a five-hour battle.
- Unknown - The Spanish attack New Providence, prompting Samuel Axe to return and defend it.

=== 1639 ===
- Summer - Nathaniel Butler captures a Spanish frigate near the harbor of Trujillo and is later paid 16,000 pesos in ransom.
- Unknown - William Jackson enters service under the Providence Island Company.

== Births ==
=== 1630 ===
- February 27 - Roche Braziliano
- Unknown - Stenka Razin

=== 1631 ===
- Unknown - Isaac Rochussen

=== 1632 ===
- Unknown - Thomas Paine

=== 1635 ===
- Unknown - Nicholas van Hoorn
- Unknown - Henry Morgan

=== 1637 ===
- Unknown - Gustav Skytte

== Deaths ==
=== 1637 ===
- August - Jacob Collaert
