= 1650s in piracy =

This timeline of the history of piracy in the 1650s is a chronological list of key events involving pirates between 1650 and 1659.

== Events ==
- Pirates out of Tortuga loot and sack Santiago de los Caballeros, a frontier town between the French and Spanish territories of Santo Domingo.
- French buccaneer Jean L'Olonnais arrives in the West Indies as an indentured servant and remained in Hispaniola for three years before escaping to nearby Tortuga.
- An increase in frigates and other warships allows the Royal Navy to strike against Royalist privateers in Ireland and Dunkirk as well as Barbary corsairs in North Africa.
- A journal written by Dutch admiral Wybrant Schram is published describing his battle against the pirate fleet led by Captain Claes G. Compaen in 1626, one of his last engagements during his later career as a pirate hunter.

=== 1650 ===
- March 26 – the Parliament of England passes an act for the redemption of captives taken by Turkish, Moorish and other pirates.
- April 1 – After being sighted off the Yorkshire coast by a local fisherman, Royalist privateer Captain Joseph Constant and his 30-man Dutch crew are surprised by an attack party led by Robert Colman and Captain Thomas Lassells and captured after a brief skirmish.

=== 1651 ===
- Royalist pirate Brown Bushell is executed having been tried for piracy and his involvement in surrendering the English city of Scarborough to Henrietta Maria.

=== 1657 ===
Brethren of the Coast is invited to use Port Royal as a base by Governor Edward D'Oley. This was done so that the Brethren would defend Port Royal.

== Births ==
- Jean Bart, a French privateer based in Dunkirk involved in France's wars against the Netherlands between 1692 and 1697.
- Benjamin Franks, an English privateer and an officer under Captain William Kidd.
- Laurens de Graaf, a Dutch pirate active in the Caribbean during the 1680s.
- Montauband, a French buccaneer active in the West Indies between 1675 and 1695.
- Thomas Pound, an English pirate active in New England and the Atlantic during the late 1680s.
- Andrew Ranson, an English buccaneer active in Spanish Florida during the early 1680s.
- William Dampier, English explorer and privateer (d. 1715)
