= 1660s in piracy =

This timeline of the history of piracy in the 1660s is a chronological list of key events involving pirates between 1660 and 1669.

== Events ==
=== 1660 ===
- Although divided largely by nationality, with the English in Jamaica and the French in Tortuga or St. Dominique, a large buccaneering presence is established in the various English, French and Dutch colonies in the Lesser Antilles.
- The island of Tortuga officially becomes a colony of France due in part to the diplomatic efforts of Jeremie Deschampes.

== Births ==
- Thomas Dover, English buccaneer

== Deaths ==
- Gustav Skytte

== See also ==
- Timeline of piracy
