= 1670s in piracy =

This timeline of the history of piracy in the 1670s is a chronological list of key events involving pirates between 1670 and 1679.

== Events ==
=== 1670 ===
- John Wentworth is appointed colonial governor of Nassau.
- June - After the signing of the Treaty of Madrid, in which Great Britain agrees to cease its privateering activities against Spain, ending British support for buccaneering raids against the Spanish. Local colonial governors such as Thomas Modyford of Jamaica reluctantly cease issuing "letters of marque".
- December - Henry Morgan's Panama expedition. In spite of a direct order from Thomas Modyford not to engage in hostilities against the Spanish, Captain Henry Morgan begins organizing a group of English and French buccaneers to raid the Spanish stronghold of Panama City. His fleet, which included 1,800 men, sailed from Port Royal as an advance force captured Fort San Lorenzo guarded the Chagres River. Travelling up the river by canoe, Morgan and his 1,200 men crossed the isthmus of Panama to attack Panama City within several weeks.

== Deaths ==
- Manuel Ribeiro Pardal, Portuguese pirate active in the Caribbean during the late 1660s.
- Christina Anna Skytte

== See also ==
- Timeline of piracy
