= 1730s in piracy =

This timeline of the history of piracy in the 1730s is a chronological list of key events involving pirates between 1730 and 1739.

== Deaths ==
John Julian (born c. 1701), mixed-blood pirate who operated in the New World.

== See also ==
- Timeline of piracy
