= 1718 in piracy =

See also 1717 in piracy, 1719 in piracy, and Timeline of piracy.

== Events ==
=== Baltic Sea ===
- Lars Gathenhielm dies and his wife Ingela Gathenhielm succeeds him as the head of the Privateer and Pirate fleet of the Baltic Sea.

=== Caribbean Sea ===
- March 28 – One of Blackbeard's lieutenants, captain Richard and his sloop Revenge, attack the 400-ton Protestant Caesar in the Bay of Honduras.
- March–April – Charles Vane and 12 pirates capture a Jamaica sloop in the Bahamas, retaining her for his own use.
- April – Vane captures the sloop Lark in the Bahamas and transfers his crew to her.
- April 5 – Blackbeard captures the logwood cutting sloop Land of Promise captained by Thomas Newton
- April 9 – Blackbeard's flotilla, including the Queen Anne's Revenge, Adventure and Revenge, loot and burn the Protestant Caesar out of Boston.
- April–July 4 – Vane robs seven French and English vessels in the Bahamas.
- Summer – Howell Davis is turned in as a pirate by the Cadogan's crew and is imprisoned on Barbados. He is eventually released for lack of evidence.
- July 24–25 – Woodes Rogers arrives at Nassau, Bahamas with two warships to assume his post as governor. Most of the pirates welcome him, except Vane, who sails away shooting at Rogers' vessels.
- July 27 – Vane captures a sloop from Barbados and incorporates it in his fleet.
- July 29 – Vane captures the John and Elizabeth, looting some pieces of eight.
- Autumn
  - Howell Davis leads a mutiny on Rogers' sloop Buck and turns back to piracy. He captures two French ships and a Spanish sloop off Hispaniola.
  - Vane plunders the inhabitants of Isleatherer (Eleuthera?).
- October – Richard Worley's pirates seize a sloop and a brigantine in the Bahamas.
- Late November – Vane attacks a French vessel in the Windward Passage, but flees upon discovering it is a warship.
- December – Vane captures a sloop and two periaguas off northwest Jamaica.
- December 9–10 – John Auger and eight of his pirates are convicted and sentenced to death for piracy at Nassau, Bahamas
- December 16 – Vane captures the sloop Pearl in the Bay of Honduras.

=== North America ===
- May 22 – Blackbeard blockades Charleston, South Carolina with a flotilla of four ships. Five vessels are captured, all merchant traffic is stopped, and several Charleston citizens are held hostage until a ransom of medicines is paid.
- June 10 – Blackbeard runs his flagship, the Queen Anne's Revenge and sloop Adventure, aground and maroons half his pirate crew.
- Early June – Blackbeard and Stede Bonnet surrender to North Carolina governor Charles Eden and are pardoned under the Act of Grace, but both soon return to piracy.
- Late June – Blackbeard captures five ships between Bermuda and North Carolina.
- June–July – Bonnet in the sloop Royal James (ex-Revenge) captures 13 vessels between North Carolina and Delaware Bay.
- August 12 – Bonnet captures a shallop in the Cape Fear River.
- August 30 – Vane takes and ransacks the ships Neptune and Emperor off the Carolinas.
- Early September – Vane attacks the shipping off Charleston, capturing five vessels. Vane's subordinate, Yeats, defects to the Charleston governor with a sloop, surrendering and accepting a pardon under the Act of Grace.
- September – Pirates led by Richard Worley, in an open boat, rob a shallop and commandeer two sloops in the Delaware River.
- September 27 – Bonnet and his men are captured by Colonel William Rhett with two sloops in the battle of Cape Fear River.
- October 23 – Vane sacks a brigantine and a sloop off Long Island, New York.
- October 24 – November 5–33 men captured from Bonnet's sloop Royal James are put on trial before Sir Nicholas Trott in Charleston. 29 are convicted and sentenced to death.
- Late October – Pirate captain Richard Worley is killed and his two vessels captured in a battle with a squadron of four South Carolinian vessels in Charleston harbor.
- November 8–22 pirates of Stede Bonnet's crew are hanged in Charleston.
- November 10–12 – Stede Bonnet is tried for piracy, convicted, and sentenced to death by Sir Nicholas Trott in Charleston.
- November 22 – Blackbeard is killed and his crew captured by Robert Maynard's men in a battle at Ocracoke Inlet.
- December 10 – Bonnet is hanged in Charleston.

=== West Africa ===
- Summer-Autumn – Edward England prowls off Sierra Leone, capturing several vessels including the snow Cadogan, whose commanding officer, Captain Skinner, is murdered. England then gives the Cadogan to his mate, Howell Davis.

== Deaths ==
- Late October – Richard Worley, American pirate captain (birthdate unknown).
- November 22 – Edward Teach, alias Blackbeard, killed in battle (born c. 1680).
- December 10 – Stede Bonnet, the so-called Gentleman Pirate, hanged (born c. 1688).
- April 25 – Lars Gathenhielm
