= 2009 in piracy =

In 2009, much greater international resolution has resulted in more control of piracy than in the prior decade, although many pirates still operate from Somalia.

- On 2 January a Netherlands Antilles-registered cargo ship was attacked by pirates in the Gulf of Aden. A Danish antipiracy ship, the Absalon, sent an armed helicopter that fired warning shots and flares. The pirate speedboat caught fire and sank.
- On 5 January, a Sierra Leone cargo vessel was attacked and chased by 4 pirate vessels in the Gulf of Aden. The ship escaped.
- On April 8, the cargo of the Maersk Alabama was attacked and captured by Somali pirates 240 nautical miles (440 km) southeast of the Somalia port city of Eyl.
- On August 27, Somali Pirates aboard M/V Win Far fired a large caliber weapon at a U.S. Navy SH-60B assigned to the USS Chancellorsville.
