= 2006 in piracy =

== Events ==
The International Maritime Organization states that there were 20 pirate attacks in January 2006, although none were successful. The first quarter of 2006 saw 61 pirate attacks up from 56 the year before. One person was killed by pirates in the Philippines.

- January 24 - USS Winston S. Churchill intercepts the MV Safina al-Birsarat off Somalia with 10 Somalis and 16 Indian crew. The Indians claim to have been captured by pirates off Mogadishu on the 15th and forced to accompany the Somalis as they sought out other ships to capture. The Somalis were handed over to a Kenyan court to be tried for piracy.
- March 15 - UN Security Council encouraged any naval forces operating off Somalia to take action against suspected piracy.
- March 18 - USS Cape St. George and USS Gonzalez engage suspected pirates, destroying a small vessel and killing one, injuring five. The men claim that their rocket propelled grenade launcher was only for helping catch illegal fishermen.
- April 4 - Somali pirates seize the 160-foot South Korean fishing boat, Dong Won 628. The guided missile destroyer USS Roosevelt and Dutch frigate HNLMS De Zeven Provinciën attempt to intercept it and fire warning shots but back down when the pirates appear on deck holding guns to some of the 25 crewmembers. The ship was held for 117 days and reportedly ransomed for $800,000.
- May - Pirates were holding three vessel hostage in Somalia including the Korean fishing boat and a United Arab Emirates oil tanker. Ransom demands are now said to average $500,000 per ship in Somalia.
- November - The ten Somalis captured by the U.S. in January were each sentenced to seven years imprisonment by a court in Mombasa, Kenya.
- November 7 - In Somalia, militia from the Union of Islamic Courts storm the Veesham One, a United Arab Emirates-registered ship captured a week earlier by pirates. The pirates had demanded a $1,000,000 ransom. Two of the six pirates were severely wounded in the gun battle but the ship's 14 crewmembers were unharmed. The pirates face amputation of their hands if convicted by the Islamic Courts.
