= Robert Sample =

Pirate (died 1719)

- Died: 1719
- Occupation: Pirate
- Known for: Sailing with Edward England
- Piratical career
- Other names: Richard
- Base of operations: Coast of Africa and in the Caribbean
- Commands: Flying King

Robert Sample (died 1719, first name occasionally Richard, last name occasionally Semple) was a pirate active off the coast of Africa and in the Caribbean. He is best known for sailing with Edward England.

== History ==
In late 1718 Edward England, aboard his ship Royal James (renamed from the recently captured Pearl) had been looting ships between Cape Verde and the Azores. He took a number of ships off Cape Coast Castle near Gambia in spring of 1719. Several he plundered and let go, a few he burned, but he refitted two for piracy. One of them was the 6-gun, 14-man Elizabeth and Katherine, commanded by Captain Bridges out of Barbados, which he captured on 27 June. Four of the Elizabeth and Katherine's crew joined England's pirates. England refitted and crewed the Elizabeth and Katherine and renamed it Flying King, naming Richard Sample as captain.

Lane and Sample's ship names were likely Jacobite in origin: Flying King was a reference to the Stuart King James II, deposed in the 1688 Glorious Revolution, who "flew" to France in exile. "Queen Anne's Revenge" was another nod to James II, brother of Queen Anne; Anne was the last Stuart monarch.

Sample sailed with Robert Lane, who captained England's other refitted vessel. They looted several ships in the Caribbean then stopped to careen their vessels. In November they sailed toward Brazil "and did a great deal of mischief" among Portuguese shipping. A Portuguese man-of-war ("a very unwelcome guest to them") chased them soon after. Lane escaped, but he and his crew died when their ship was lost offshore. Sample was unable to evade the warship and tried to escape by beaching the Flying King. Twelve of its crew had been killed; the Portuguese captured the rest, hanging 38, almost all of whom were English.
