= Jan de Bouff =

Dutch pirate

- Occupation: Renegade privateer
- Known for: Entered Habsburg service and raided shipping as a Dunkirker
- Piratical career
- Battles: Dutch War of Independence

Jan de Bouff was a Dutch renegade privateer who, during the Dutch War of Independence, entered Habsburg service and raided shipping as a Dunkirker during 1602.

While attacking three French fishing boats in December of that year, he was surprised by the arrival of six Dutch ships out of Ostend. Although initially outnumbered, three other Dunkirkers joined the battle on behalf of De Bouff and, after the capture of two Ostend vessels, the remaining four were forced to flee shortly after. It is unknown whether De Bouff survived this battle; there are no further recorded incidents following the battle.
