= Isaac Rochussen =

- Born: 1631; Vlissingen, Netherlands
- Died: 1710 (aged 78–79)
- Piratical career
- Type: Corsair
- Allegiance: Netherlands
- Years active: 1650s-1670s
- Rank: Captain
- Base of operations: Vlissingen
- Commands: De Eendracht
- Battles: Second Anglo-Dutch War; Third Anglo-Dutch War; Capture of The Falcon (1672)
- Later work: Privateer

Isaac Rochussen or Isaac Rockesen (1631–1710) was a 17th-century Dutch corsair and privateer during the Second and Third Anglo-Dutch War. His capture of The Falcon, a merchantman belonging to the East India Company, was one of the most valued ships captured during the late 17th century.

== Biography ==
Isaac Rochussen was born in the city of Vlissingen, although little of his life is recorded. An active corsair during the Second and Third Anglo-Dutch War, he captured the English East India merchantman The Falcon near the Isles of Scilly on July 7, 1672. The prize was sold at as 350,000 gilders, the highest paid for the time when an average ship and cargo went for only a few thousand or, at best, tens of thousands of gilders. The Falcon was thereafter referred to by the Dutch as De Gouden Valk (or The Golden Falcon). Rochussen himself received a gold medal from the ships´ owner for this capture. He later became a successful privateer in his later years, a trade followed by his son Isaac Rochussen Jr., before his death in 1710.
