= Piracy and armed robbery in the Singapore Strait =

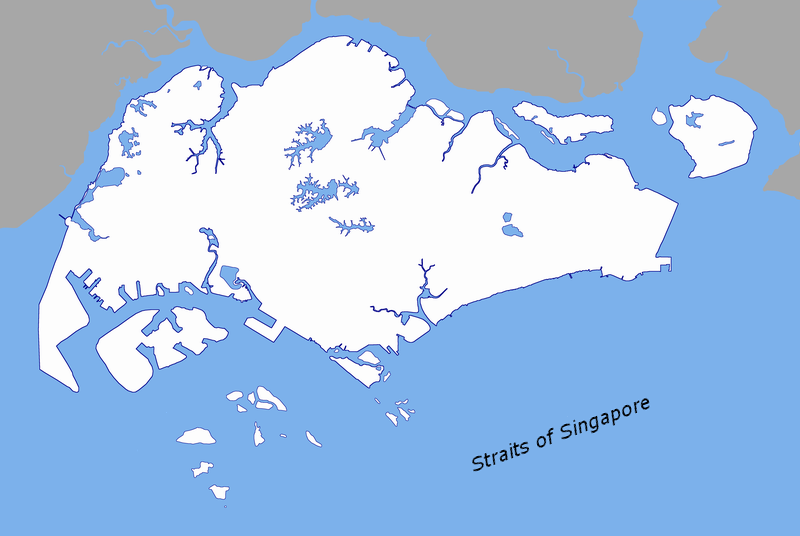
A map of the Singapore Strait

Frequent incidents of piracy and armed robbery in the Singapore Strait have led to the area being labelled as an area of concern by the Regional Cooperation Agreement on Combating Piracy and Armed Robbery against Ships in Asia (RECAAP). The Singapore Strait is located south of Singapore, south-east of Malaysia and north of the Indonesian Riau Islands. The Singapore Strait is roughly 113 km long with an average width of 19 km. The Singapore Strait was the location of 65% (55 out of 84) of all incidents of piracy and armed robbery which occurred in Asia in 2022, marking a seven year high in recorded incidents of piracy and armed robbery in the area.

Between 2007- 2022, 11% of recorded incidents in the Singapore Strait were incidents of piracy and 89% were incidents of armed robbery against ships. There were 34 recorded incidents of piracy and armed robbery at sea in the Singapore Strait in 2020, 49 in 2021, and 55 in 2022; indicating a trend of increasing incidents. This trend goes against the global figures of piracy and armed robbery incidents, which are at their lowest level since 1994.

== Distinguishing between piracy and armed robbery ==
It is important to highlight the difference between piracy and armed robbery to be able to determine both the extent of these offences, as well as the legal consequences that follow; such as who has the jurisdiction to chase, arrest and prosecute the perpetrators. According to the United Nations Convention on the Law of the Sea (UNCLOS) definition, piracy can only occur on the high seas. Whereas armed robbery is not covered by UNCLOS and is defined by the International Maritime Organization (IMO) as essentially the same act as piracy, with the important distinction that armed robbery against ships can occur only within a State's internal waters, archipelagic waters and territorial waters.

Universal jurisdiction is granted to every State to take whatever action they may deem necessary to apprehend pirate ships and to prosecute the alleged pirates as international criminals in their respective courts. Therefore, distinguishing whether an act was an act of piracy or armed robbery determines if an international response is warranted, versus a solely domestic response by the country which has jurisdiction over the territorial waters in which the offence was committed.

== Historical difficulties of measuring the scale of piracy and armed robbery in the Singapore Strait ==
The Singapore Strait sits entirely within the territorial waters of Indonesia, Malaysia, and Singapore. This means that, technically, the recorded incidents in the Singapore Strait are incidents of armed robbery and not piracy as defined by UNCLOS. While this may seem straightforward, there has been a high degree of uncertainty for many years regarding how many piratical attacks have actually been committed in the Singapore Strait. This is due to the fact that multiple news agencies, and influential segments of both the shipping and maritime insurance industries were using a different definition of piracy, which was set by the International Maritime Bureau (IMB).

The IMB opted for a view which they held from 1992 to 2009, in which piracy could occur on the high seas, as well as in territorial waters. The IMB argued that the exact technicalities of the definition have no relevance to victims of piracy, and that the majority of piratical acts occur within the territorial waters of sovereign states in modern times. The influence of the IMB throughout the 1992 to 2006 period in the Singapore Strait was significant as indicated by the domination of their definition of piracy in public discourse, the media, and the shipping sector.

As a result of the conflicting definitions used by the IMO and the IMB which were both competing and credible sources, there was a lot of uncertainty as to the actual level of piracy occurring in the Singapore Strait. If there were indeed high levels of piracy occurring as defined by the IMB, then all nations under international law had the authority to protect the Singapore Strait, and in doing so would encroach on the sovereignty of Singapore, Indonesia and Malaysia over their coastal waters, whereas if these acts were actually armed robbery against ships as the IMO argued, then the responsibility to deal with them would rest mainly with Singapore, Indonesia and Malaysia. Internationalizing the security of the Singapore Strait was a development which Singapore was in support of, whereas Malaysia and Indonesia did not want to have their national sovereignty encroached upon and were openly against it.

== Modus operandi and methodology of modern pirates ==
The perpetrators in the Singapore Strait typically board ships to steal unsecured items, and spare engine parts, usually without confronting or harming the crew. This differs from the typical incidents of piracy and armed robbery in the African region, such as waters off the coast of Somalia, the Gulf of Aden, or the Gulf of Guinea, where in multiple cases, ship crews were held for ransom or were subjected to violence.

The perpetrators in the Singapore Strait usually attempt to avoid suspicion by adopting the profile of fishing boats; making use of a multitude of tools such as poles, hooks and lines to board ships. This differs from pirates in the Gulf of Guinea and the Gulf of Aden who utilize high speed skiffs and long ladders for boarding ships.

== Motivating drivers ==
Piracy and armed robbery in the Singapore Strait is mainly a result of economic difficulties as well as other pressures stemming from the land. According to the IMB, a rapid increase in incidents happened immediately after the 1997 East Asian Financial Crisis. Many of the perpetrators during this time were port workers and fishermen who had lost their jobs and were resorting to committing piratical acts in an attempt to compensate for their unexpected loss of income. Similarly, there was a notable increase in attacks of an opportunistic nature recorded after the 2008 economic slowdown, especially in late 2009 and 2010.

Regarding the 55 incidents of piracy and armed robbery in the Singapore Strait recorded in 2022, the Executive Director of ReCAAP stated that these incidents were also opportunistic in nature, and the high rate of incidents could have been influenced by the social and economic situation in the region. Roughly 1,000 ships pass through the Singapore Strait every day, meaning that the environment is ideal for perpetrators who may want to make some money quickly to help with their economic struggles.

== Potential solutions to piracy and armed robbery ==
=== Increasing arrest rates ===
It is likely that without the arrest of perpetrators, incidents will continue to occur. The Singapore Strait recorded an all-time high of 99 incidents in 2015 which decreased significantly to 2 incidents in 2016, possibly due to the arrests of perpetrators by the authorities. This dramatic decrease points to law enforcement as potentially being the best deterrent. However, in 2020 there was only one recorded instance of arrests being made in a case where the crew detained the three perpetrators until the Indonesian Navy arrived.

=== Increased regional co-operation ===
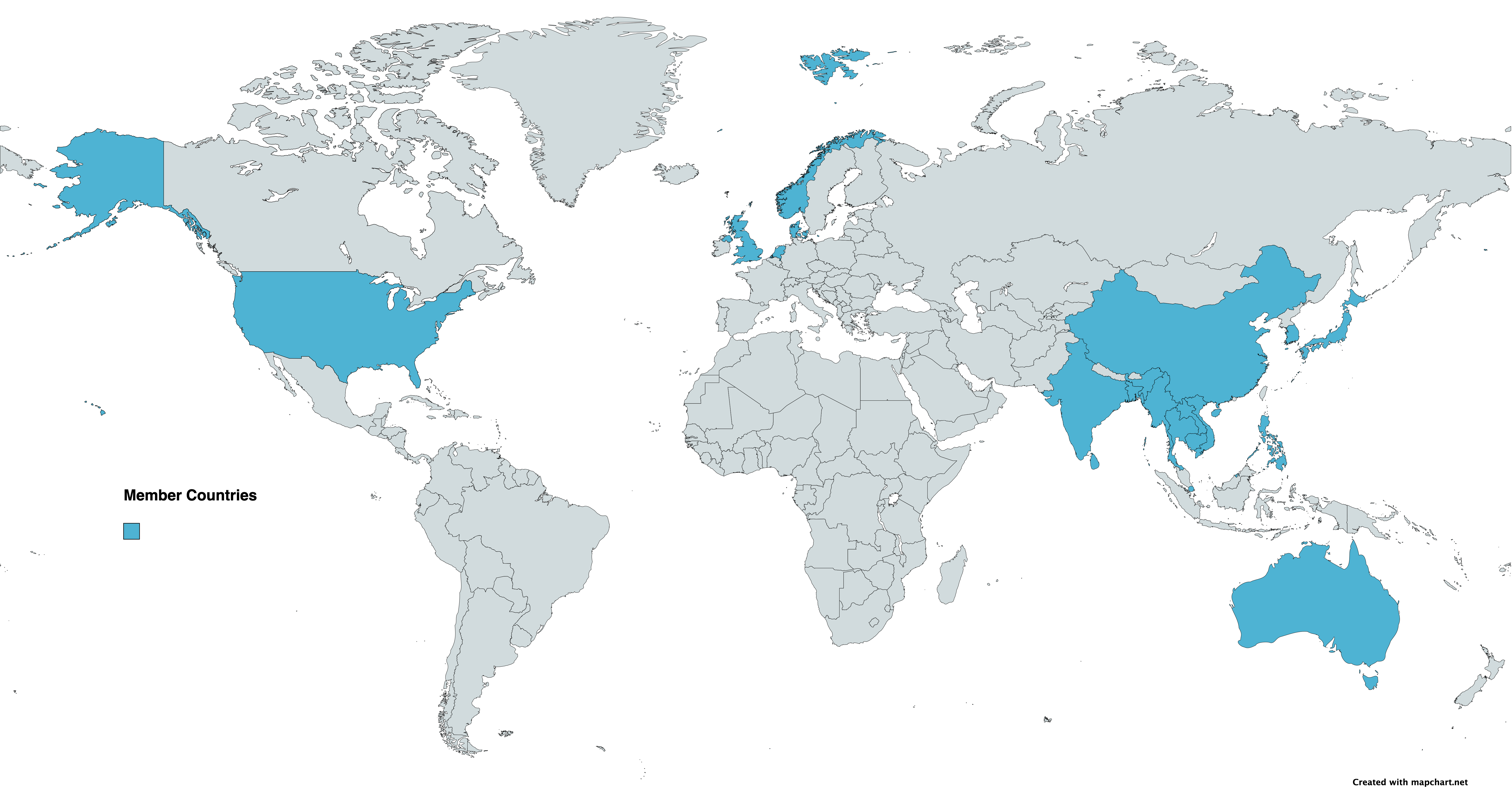
Highlighted in blue are the members of the Regional Cooperation Agreement on Combating Piracy and Armed Robbery against Ships in Asia (RECAAP)

RECAAP was established in 2006 and is the first regional government-to-government agreement for the purpose of promoting and enhancing cooperation against piracy and armed robbery against ships in Asia. RECAAP currently has 20 member countries, including all members of ASEAN except Malaysia and Indonesia; however, information sharing with both countries does occur and efforts are being made to make Malaysia and Indonesia members.

RECAAP recommended further cooperation between Singapore, Malaysia and Indonesia by way of coordinating surveillance and patrols. RECAAP also made suggestions for ship crews, such as increasing the frequency of lookouts for suspicious boats, and sounding an alarm when sighting suspicious boats or unauthorized persons on board ships.

=== Enhancing naval capabilities ===
In Southeast Asia, all bilateral or multilateral anti-piracy operations are coordinated patrols rather than joint patrols, which do not allow the pursuit of pirates into a neighbor's territorial waters. While this practice respects the sovereignty of the territorial borders of Singapore, Indonesia, and Malaysia; it is problematic. Strictly following this principle will likely lead the law enforcement agencies operating in the Singapore Strait to miss their best chance to catch pirates red-handed; as indicated by the several reported instances of the pirates having escaped by the time the foreign counterparts arrived at the scene. This means that pirates could potentially take advantage of jurisdictional limits by committing their crimes in the territorial waters of one state, then fleeing into the territorial waters of another.

However, if the patrol were a joint patrol, as recommended by the IMO, rather than a coordinated patrol, law enforcement agencies could go in hot pursuit of pirates into other countries' territorial waters, and there is a possibility that more pirates would be apprehended and prosecuted, rather than escaping. In summary, the coordinated patrol protects the sovereignty of coastal countries, with the negative effect of reducing the effectiveness of the patrol. Whereas joint patrols are likely to be more effective, but, as a result of Malaysia and Indonesia not being signatories to the Convention for the Suppression of Unlawful Acts against the Safety of Maritime Navigation (SUA Convention), joint patrols cannot be utilized. Despite the appeals of the shipping industry and other international communities to Malaysia and Indonesia to ratify the SUA Convention, there have been no steps taken towards ratification by either country.

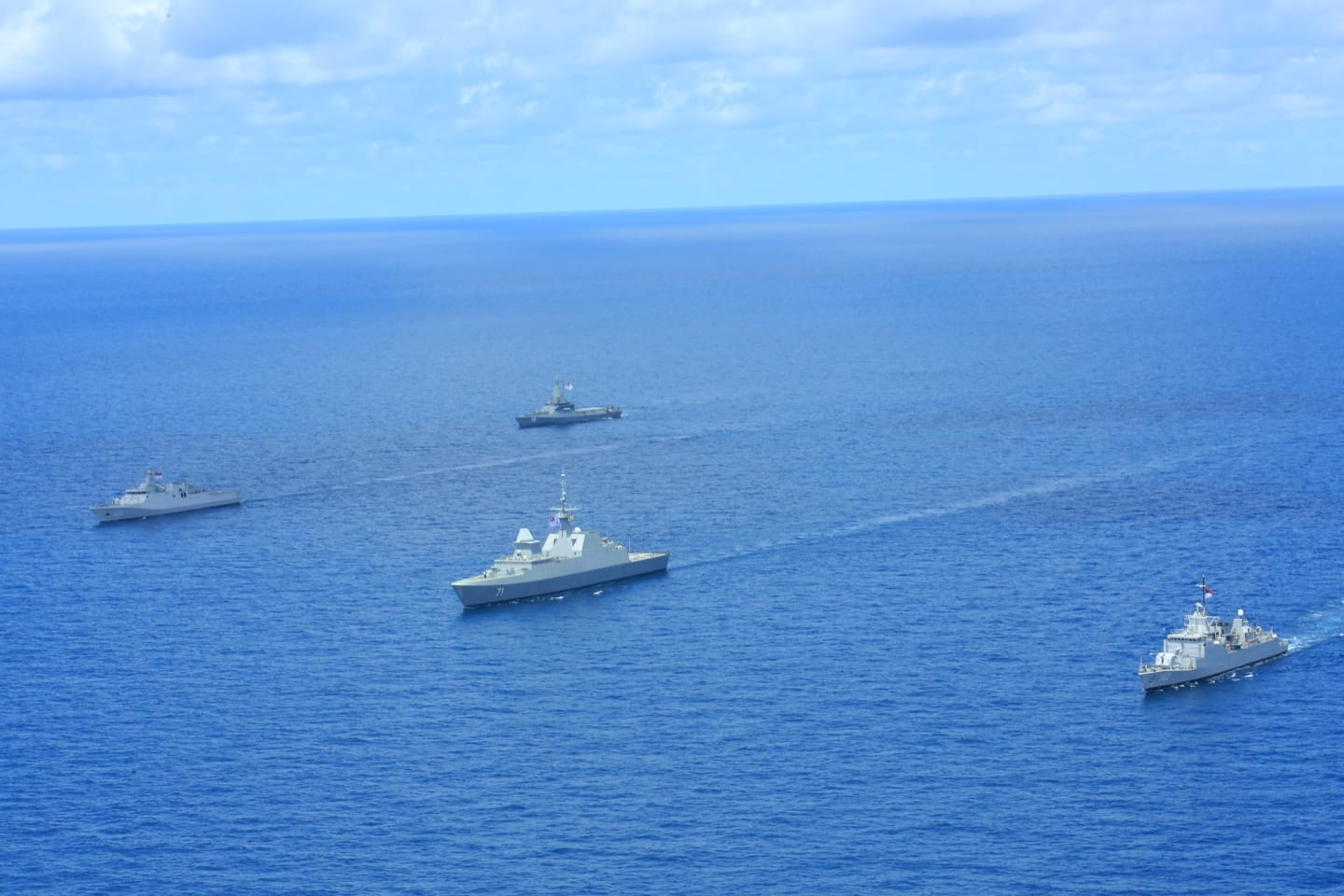
Pictured is the RSS Tenacious and RSS Justice of the Singaporean Navy along with the KRI Diponegoro and KRI Malahayati of the Indonesian Navy during the 2021 Eagle Indopura Joint Exercise

However, Indonesia, Singapore and Malaysia do actively engage in joint naval exercises, such as Exercise Eagle Indopura which is a long-standing bilateral exercise between Indonesia and Singapore; Exercise Malapura which is a bilateral exercise between the Singaporean and Malaysian navies; and finally the Malindo Jaya exercise between Malaysian and Indonesian navies. Bilateral exercises such as these help to share knowledge, build stronger relations and increase maritime security.
