= Robert Lane (pirate) =

Historical pirate

- Died: Brazil
- Occupation: Pirate
- Known for: Sailing with Edward England
- Piratical career
- Base of operations: Caribbean and off the coast of Africa
- Commands: Queen Anne's Revenge

Robert Lane (died 1719) was a pirate active in the Caribbean and off the coast of Africa. He is best known for sailing with Edward England.

== History ==
Edward England had taken the ship Pearl (renamed Royal James) in late 1718, pirating between the Azores and Cape Verde. In spring 1719 he took a number of ships near Gambia. Several he burned or looted and let go, but he kept two. One of them was the 4-gun, 18-man Mercury, commanded by Captain Maggot out of London, which he captured on 29 May, upgrading it to 14 guns and 30 men. A few of the Mercury's crew joined England's pirates. England crewed and refitted the Mercury and renamed it Queen Anne's Revenge, appointing Robert Lane as captain.

Lane sailed alongside Robert Sample, who captained the other vessel England had refitted. They sailed to the Caribbean, looting several ships before careening their vessels. After careening their ship in the Bahamas in November (several men from the captured Neptune joined the pirates), they were chased by pirate hunters sent by Governor Woodes Rogers. The pirate hunters retook their captured ships but Lane and Queen Anne's Revenge escaped. Afterwards they sailed to Brazil "and did a great deal of mischief", plundering Portuguese ships. They were approached by a Portuguese man-of-war ("a very unwelcome guest to them") who chased the two pirates. Sample was forced to beach his ship and was captured. Lane escaped the man-of-war, but he and his crew perished when the Queen Anne's Revenge was lost ashore.

Robert Lane's ship Queen Anne’s Revenge should not be confused with Blackbeard’s ship Queen Anne's Revenge, which had been grounded and wrecked at Topsail Inlet in spring 1718.
