= Browne Bushell =

English Civil War-era naval officer

Browne Bushell (bap. 1609, d. 1651), was an English Civil War-era naval officer. He initially sided with the Roundheads. On the night of 15 August 1641 he led a small parliamentary force in a cutting out operation to capture the Henrietta Marie in Portsmouth Harbour. In 1643 he switched to the royalist side. He was executed for treason in March 1651.

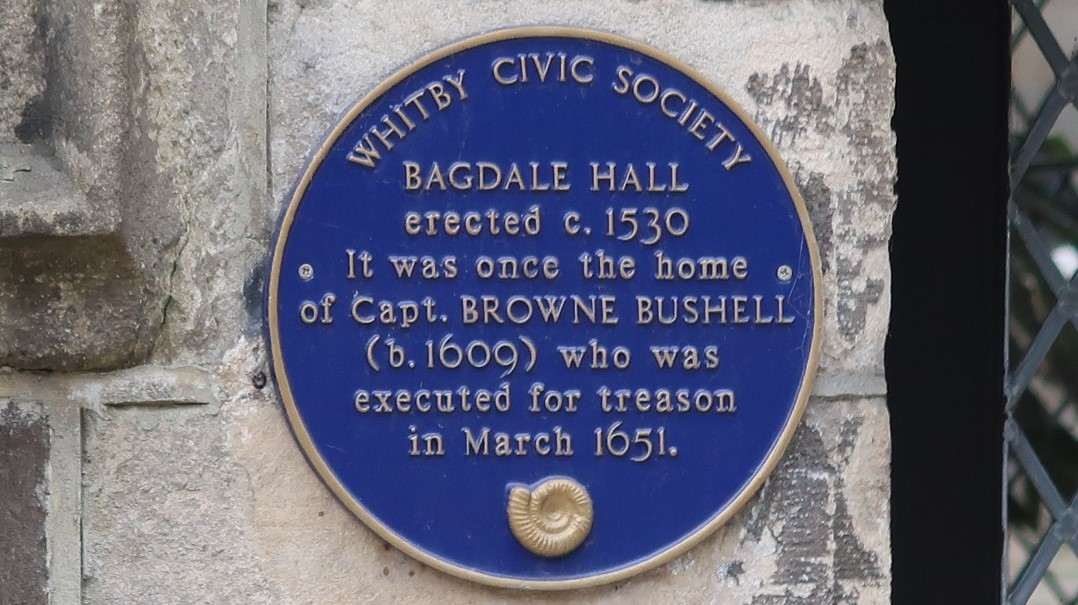
Blue Plaque put on Bagdale Hall, Whitby by Whitby Civic Society where Browne Bushell once lived
