= 1707 in piracy =

== Events ==
- Thomas Moore is appointed pilot of a privateer and engaged by Guillaume Gaillard command the La-Nostre-Dame-de-Victoire in a privateering expedition "against enemies of the state" in Cape Breton, Newfoundland, the Great Banks and elsewhere. An experienced sea captain, he reportedly conducted merchant ships to Hudson Bay as a master or pilot under Pierre Le Moyne d'Iberville.
- A privateer manned by Irish and Scottish Jacobites sails from France to Wexford. Once ashore, the crew led by Thady Doyle attacks the town "full of fire and vengeance". Doyle, himself a local Wexford Jacobite, points out houses belonging to Protestants and Catholics "in order that the former might be plundered and the latter spared".
- A French privateer kidnaps the work party constructing the second Eddystone lighthouse (Rudyard's lighthouse) and taken back to France where they are imprisoned. Upon hearing news of the incident, Louis XIV set the men free and instead put their captors in prison instead. The French king then stated "though he was at war with England, he was not at war with mankind" and sent the Englishmen back to their country loaded with presents.
- The Knights of Malta sends its naval squadron, consisting of five well-armed sailing ships, to provide support for the Spanish garrison at Oran during an attack by Algiers. This same squadron was successful in taking a 46-gun Turkish slaver the previous year.
- The Charles, the former flagship of American colonial privateer John Halsey, is sunk in a hurricane off the coast of India. After a year in the Indian Ocean, Halsey had built up a formidable fleet and later changed his flagship to the Neptune.
- Kanhoji Angria, a pirate active between Bombay and the Malabar coast, is reported to have amassed "a fleet of considerable strength" after two years of harassing local merchantmen. Although politically distinct from the Maratha government, at least to some extent, he occupies a port city on the Maratha coast. That same year, he attacked the English frigate Bombay which exploded during a brief firefight.
- Robert Hunter, recently appointed lieutenant governor of the Colony of Virginia, is captured by a French privateer while en route to Virginia and taken to France. After a brief time in prison, he is released in a prisoner exchange.
- March - Woodes Rogers receives a letter of marque to command the 100-ton Eugene Prize, a privateering ship he co-owned with Bristol merchant and fitted with eight cannon and carrying 20 men. During his first voyage, he encounters marooned privateer Alexander Selkirk and rescues him after four years living on Juan Fernández Islands. At the end of the year, he was approached by William Dampier in the hopes of bankrolling a privateering expedition against the Spanish.

== Deaths ==
- Alexandre Esquemeling, historian and author of the 1678 book The Buccaneers of America.
