= 1610s in piracy =

This timeline of the history of piracy in the 1610s is a chronological list of key events involving pirates between 1610 and 1619.

== Events ==
=== 1610 ===
- By December - Word has reached England of Francis Verney and Jack Ward's conversion to Islam.
- December 8 - The English pirate Peter Love, who had set up base in the Outer Hebrides, was betrayed by a confederate, tried for piracy, and executed in Scotland.
- Unknown - Hendrik Brouwer sails for the Dutch East Indies commanding three ships for the Dutch East India Company.
- Unknown - Henry Mainwaring is commissioned to capture Peter Easton.
- Unknown - Easton blockades the Bristol Channel.

=== 1611 ===
- Late Spring - Easton arrives off the coast of Cork with a squadron of ships requesting to parley.

=== 1612 ===
- February - A general pardon of all pirates who are subjects of James I is announced
- November - James I issues a pardon in Easton's name if he is to return the Concorde to its previous owners.

=== 1613 ===
- Early in the year - The Duke of Savoy declares Nice and Villefranche to be free ports and offering asylum for pirates.
- February 20 - Easton sails into Villefranche and meets with the Duke of Savoy, investing 100,000 crowns in return for annual income.

=== 1614 ===
- June 4 - Mainwaring arrives in Newfoundland with a fleet of six ships.
- Late in the year - Louis XIII asks Simon Danseker to help negotiate with the pirates around Tunis.
- Unknown - Verney converts back to Catholicism to escape being a galley slave after being captured by a Sicilian corsair.

=== 1615 ===
- February - Having agreed to Louis XIII's request, Danseker arrives in the Gulf of Tunis with two French ships.
- June - Mainwaring engages four Spanish men-of-war off the coast of Portugal and emerges successful.

=== 1616 ===
- June 9 - Mainwaring is pardoned by James I.

=== 1617 ===
- Walter Raleigh is pardoned by James I and sent on a second expedition in search of El Dorado.

=== 1618 ===
- March 20 - Mainwaring is knighted at Woking.
- May 23 - The Thirty Years' War starts, causing a rise in piracy.
- October 29 - Raleigh is executed.
- Unknown - Piet Pieterszoon Hein is pressed into service by the Republic of Venice.
- Unknown - Robert Walsingham is captured in Ireland by the English.

== Births ==
=== 1615 ===
- After February - Simon Danseker

=== 1618 ===
- Unknown - Pérez de Guzmán

== Deaths ==
=== 1610 ===
- November 9 - George Somers
- December 8 - Peter Love

=== 1613 ===
- April - Neil MacLeod

=== 1615 ===
- September 6 - Francis Verney

=== 1618 ===
- January - Lawrence Kemys
- June 6 - James Lancaster
- September 24 - William Parker
- October 29 - Walter Raleigh
