= 1709 in piracy =

== Events ==
- The pirate biography, The life and adventures of Capt. John Avery, the famous English pirate, (rais'd from a cabbin-boy, to a King) now in possession of Madagascar published in the UK and becomes a bestseller.
- April - Privateer Woodes Rogers and the ships Duke and Duchess raid Guayaquil in the Viceroyalty of Peru.
- December 22 - Rogers captures the Desengaño, one of the two Manila galleons, off Cabo San Lucas. Rogers is wounded.
- December 25 - Rogers's Duke and Duchess attack the Begoña, the larger of the two Manila galleons, and are repulsed with heavy losses.
