= Edward Congdon =

British pirate

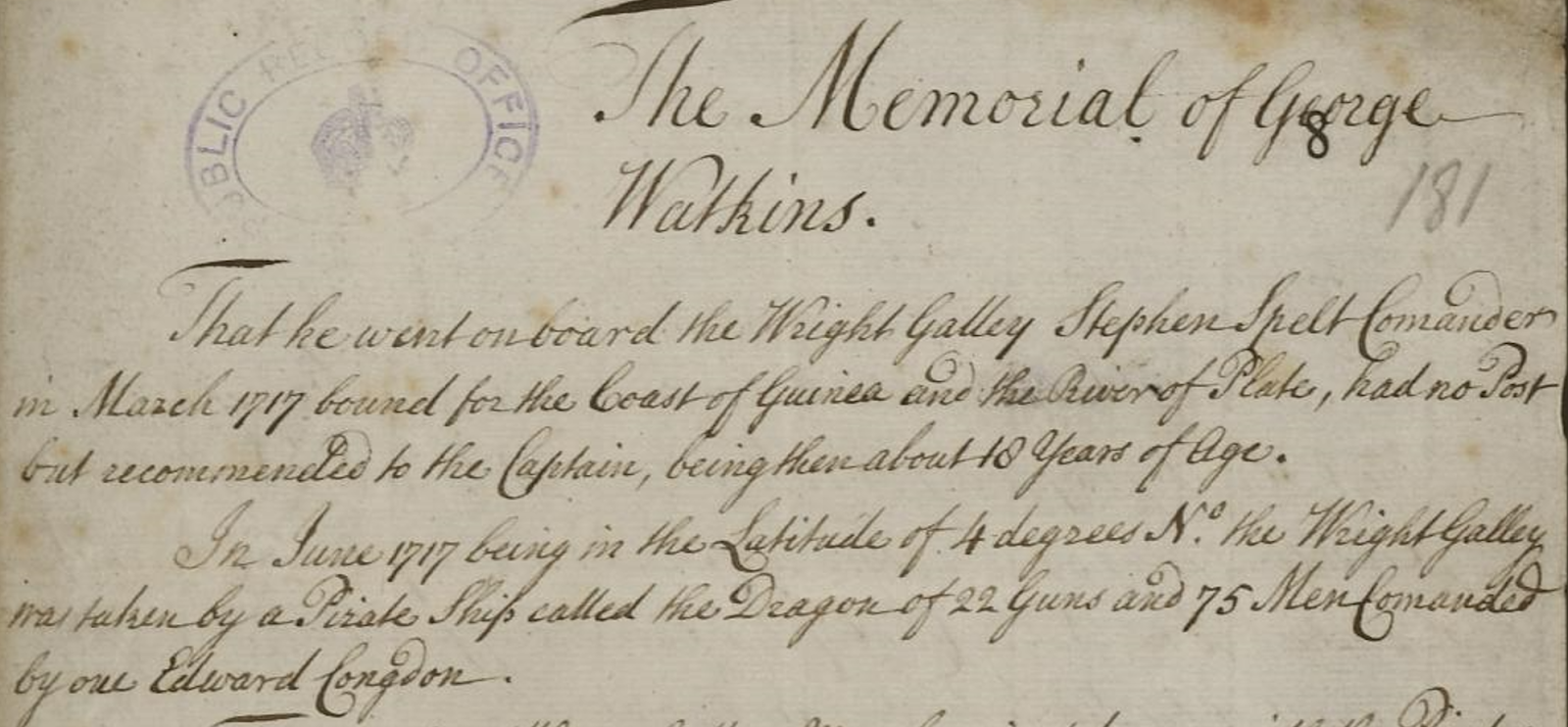
Memorial of George Watkins, a navigator captured by pirates under Edward Congdon, confirming his name and his ship's name

Edward Congdon (died 1734), born in Plymouth in Devon, was an English pirate who was best known for his piracies in the Indian Ocean.

His name is often confused by modern additions. French and English sources confirm his name as "Edward Congdon." He has been known under the surnames Congdon, Coudon, Comdon, Connor, Condell, or Gonwel; various given names also arise, including Edmond and Edward. Modern sources often misidentify him as William or Christopher Condent. His frequently-encountered nickname was "Billy One-Hand". "Christopher" as his given name was not seen in period sources and dates only to the 1950s.

== History ==
Around 1718, when Woodes Rogers became governor of the Bahamas, and was tasked with ridding the Caribbean of pirates, Congdon and his crew left New Providence. During a trip across the Atlantic Ocean, Congdon killed an Indian crewmember, who threatened to ignite the ship's powder magazine. Shortly after, the ship captured a merchantman, the Duke of York. After a dispute, the crew split up between the two ships, with Congdon elected captain of the sloop. At the Cape Verde Islands, Congdon and his men captured a ship carrying Portuguese wine. Congdon then sailed to Brazil, where he took more prizes, occasionally cutting off the ears and noses of Portuguese prisoners. He then returned to the area around Cape Verde, where he captured a flotilla of twenty small ships and a Dutch war sloop off Santiago. Congdon kept the warship, and named it Dragon. (Note: Modern writers (Clifford, et al.) generally refer to it as "The Fiery Dragon;" Johnson (1724) called it "Flying Dragon" but the majority of period sources, witness statements, newspaper reports, etc. only call it "Dragon.")

Congdon seized the English galley, the Wright, a Portuguese ship, and a 26-gun Dutch vessel. Leaving the Wright behind, he led a fleet of three ships to the Gold Coast (Ghana) where they captured the Indian Queen, the Fame, and another Dutch ship.

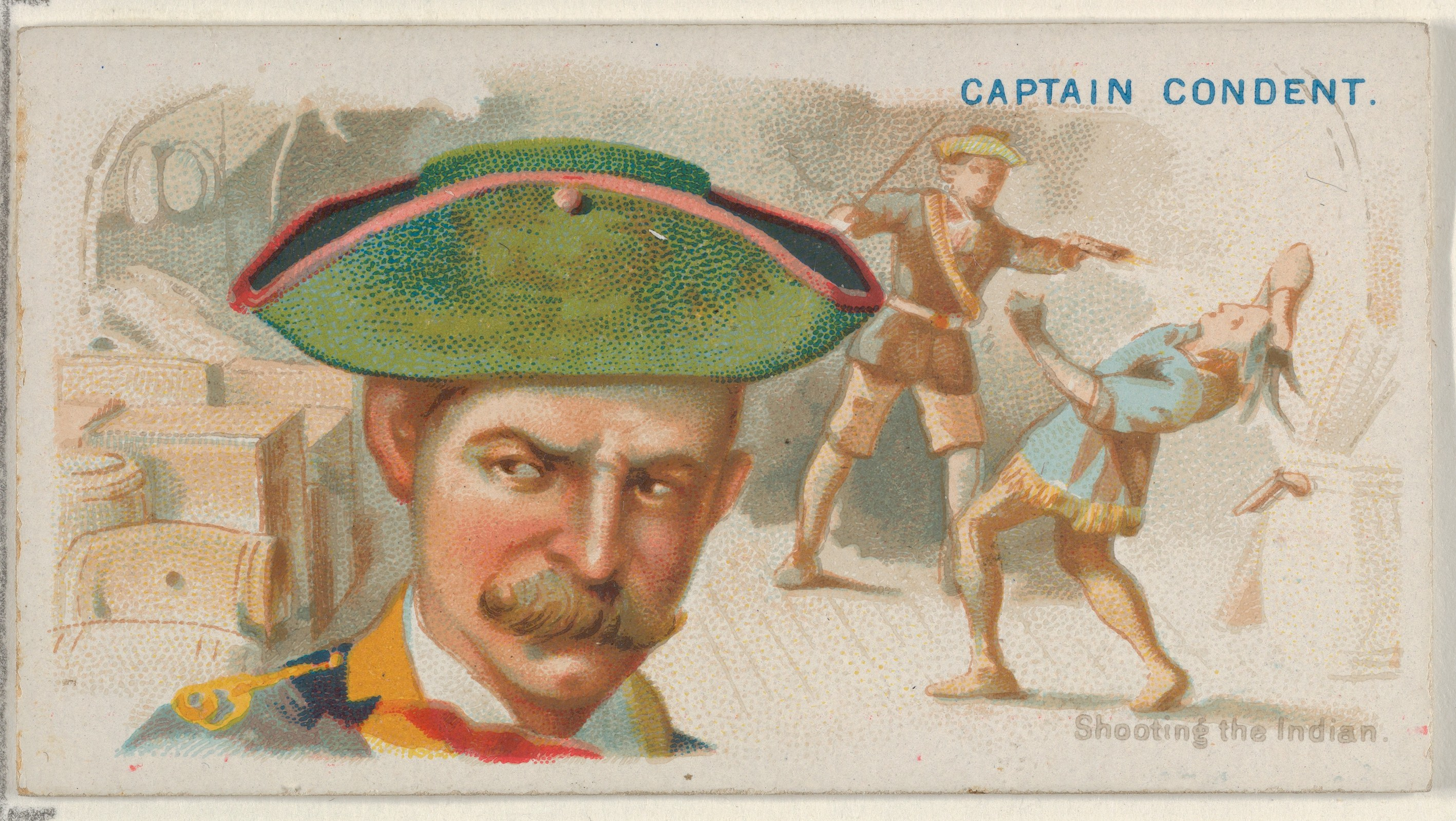
Captain Condent, Shooting the Indian, from the Pirates of the Spanish Main series (N19) for Allen & Ginter Cigarettes MET DP835009

By April 1719, Congdon had reached the island of Sainte-Marie, Madagascar. There he integrated some of John Halsey's old crew into his own. After a successful cruise to the East Indies they captured a rich Arab trading ship called Faza Ramance. Congdon and his crew returned to the island of Sainte-Marie, dividing their haul into around £3,000 each. While there he traded with visiting British slavers and merchants, one of whom reported that Congdon and his crew had so much treasure, they "need not go to sea again as long as they lived". In 1721 Congdon and forty other members of his crew sailed to the island of Bourbon where they negotiated with the French governor for a pardon; twenty or more of the men settled on the island; Congdon went on to marry the governor's sister-in-law. At Réunion he was visited by pirates Levasseur, Taylor, and Seagar who had captured the Portuguese Viceroy of Goa aboard the fantastically wealthy Nossa Senhora do Cabo. Congdon negotiated between the pirates and the island's Governor for the Viceroy's release. In 1723 Congdon travelled to France, where he settled down with his wife in Brittany and became a wealthy merchant in Saint-Malo. The last of his surviving crew died in the Mascarene Islands in 1770. One of his former crew who remained at Madagascar was James Plaintain, who established a trading post and set himself up as a local "King" with his share of treasure from the Faza Ramance.

== His ship ==
At first thought to be William Kidd's Adventure Galley, the Fiery Dragon was claimed to have been found by Barry Clifford off the coast of Sainte-Marie, Madagascar, where it was purposely sunk in 1721. However, a UNESCO analysis of Clifford's discovery reported that Clifford had instead found an unrelated ship of Asian origin.

== Flag ==
The flag incorrectly associated with Edward Congdon.

A more likely version of his flag as described by witnesses.

The Jolly Roger flag generally associated with Congdon - three skulls-and-crossbones on a black flag or banner - first appeared in Mariner's Mirror in 1912, though it was not attributed to Congdon and was dated to 1704. A similar design was printed in Basil Lubbock's "Blackwall Frigates" in 1922 and F. Bradlee's "Piracy in the West Indies and its suppression" in 1923, again not attributed to Congdon. Charles Grey attributed it to him in 1933 in "Pirates of the Eastern Seas" but without citing any evidence. The only period source describing his flag is an article in The St. James Post from June 1718 describing his ships "who appear'd with flags having a Deaths Head on them."

== Bibliography ==
- Clifford, Barry (2005). Return to Treasure Island and the Search for Captain Kidd. Perennial. ISBN 0-06-095982-7.
- Clifford, Brandon (2008). "The Gold of Billy One-Hand" (PDF). Expedition Whydah. Archived from the original (PDF) on 15 February 2010.
- Standish, Carol (April 2005). "Return to Treasure Island and the Search for Captain Kidd (book review)". Maine Harbors.
- Christopher Condent at Rob Ossian's Pirate Cove!
