= Singapore Strait =

Strait between Indonesia, Malaysia and Singapore

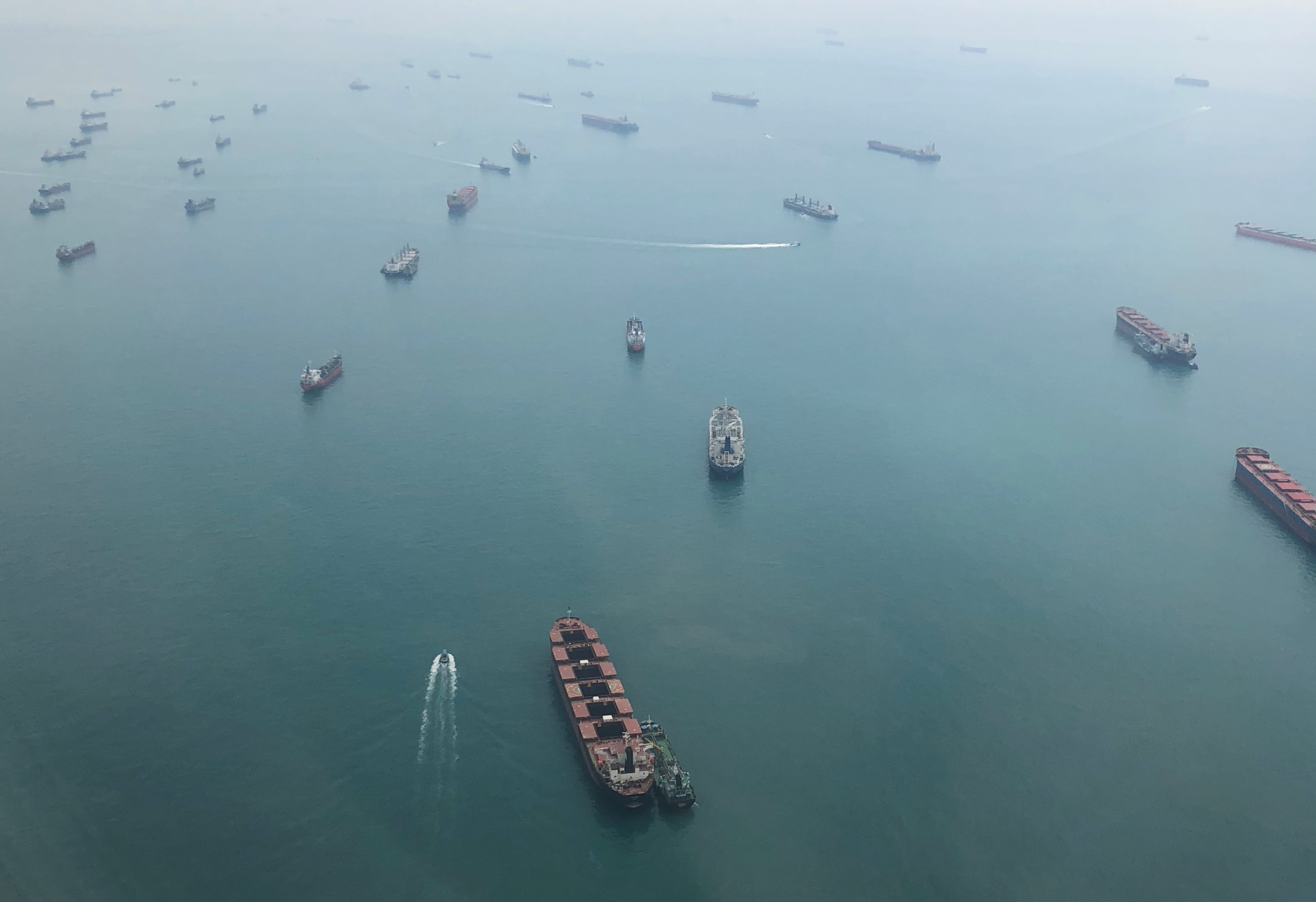
- Cargo ships on the Singapore Strait
- Interactive map of Singapore Strait
- Coordinates: 01.22°N 103.92°E
- Type: Strait
- Basin countries: Singapore; Indonesia; Malaysia
- Max. length: 114 km (71 mi)
- Min. width: 16 km (9.9 mi)
- Average depth: 22 m (72 ft) (minimum, within the nautical channel)
- Settlements: Singapore; Batam

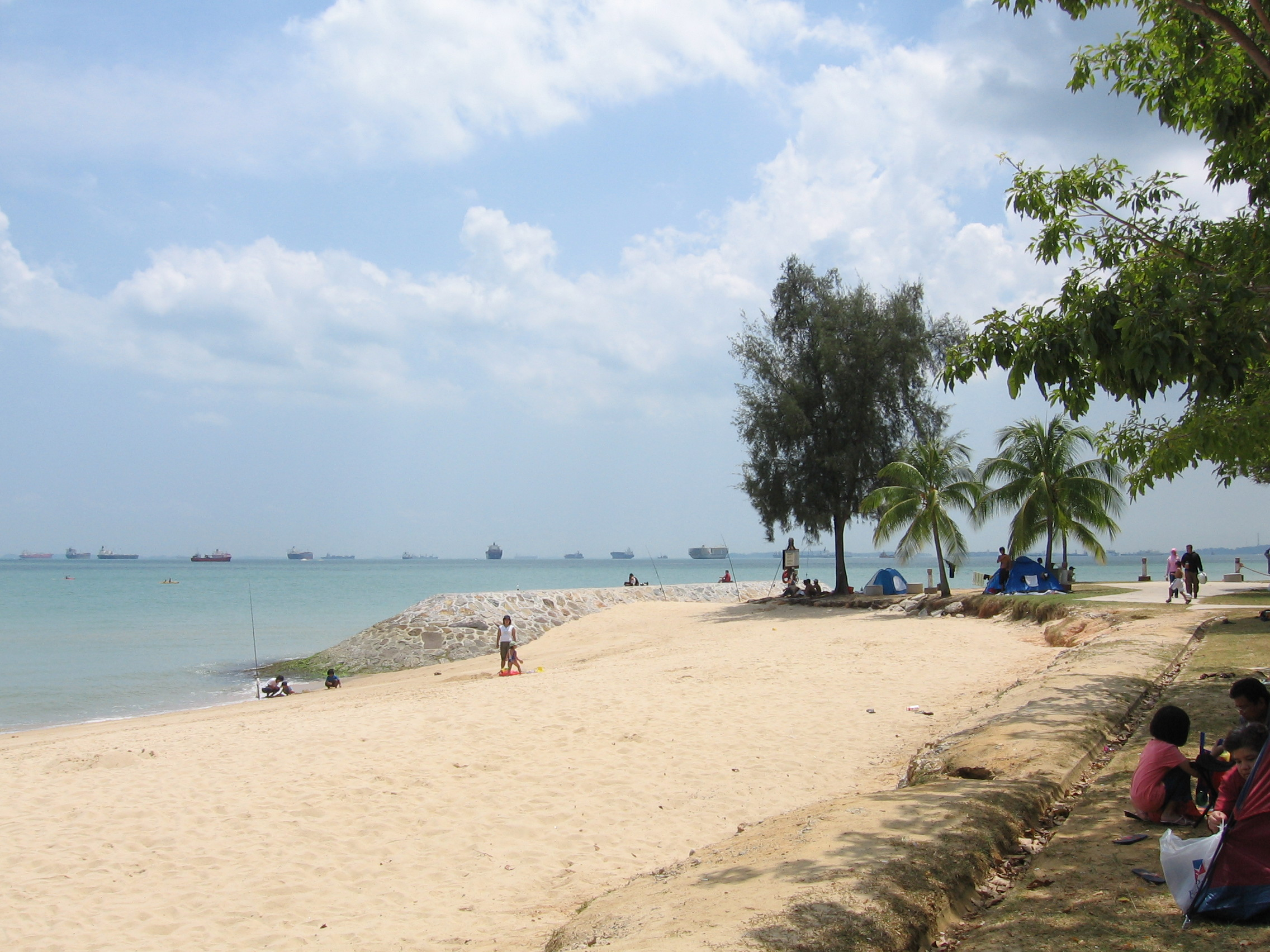
The Singapore Strait, as seen from East Coast Park

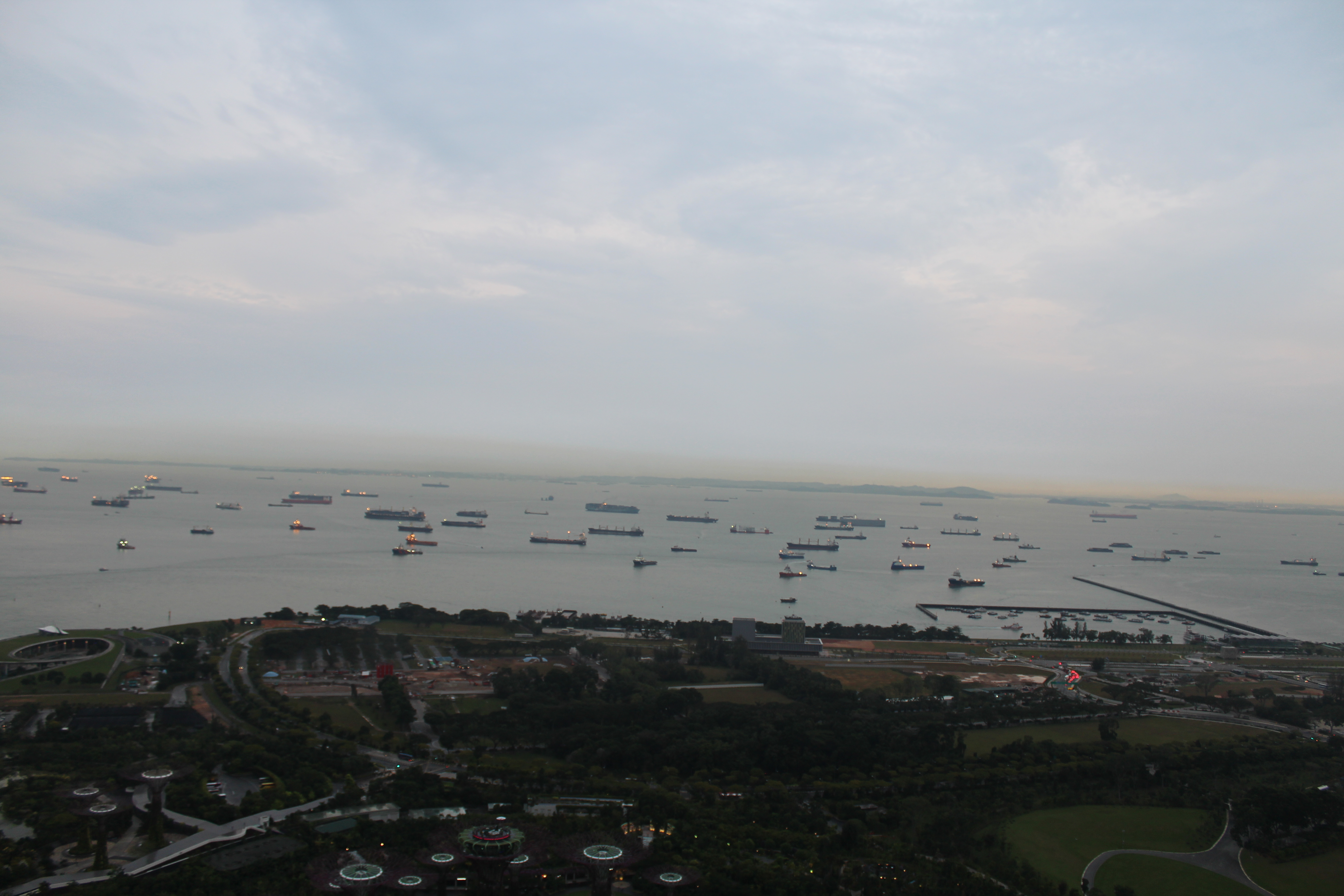
The Singapore Strait, as seen from Marina Bay Sands

The Singapore Strait is a 113 km-long (70 mi), 19 km-wide (12 mi) strait between the Strait of Malacca in the west and the South China Sea in the east. Singapore is on the north of the channel, and the Indonesian Riau Islands are on the south. The two countries share a maritime border along the strait.

It includes Keppel Harbour and many small islands. The strait provides the deepwater passage to the Port of Singapore, which makes it very busy. Approximately 2,000 merchant ships traverse the waters on a daily basis in 2017. The depth of the Singapore Strait limits the maximum draft of vessels going through the Straits of Malacca, and the Malaccamax ship class.

== Historical records ==
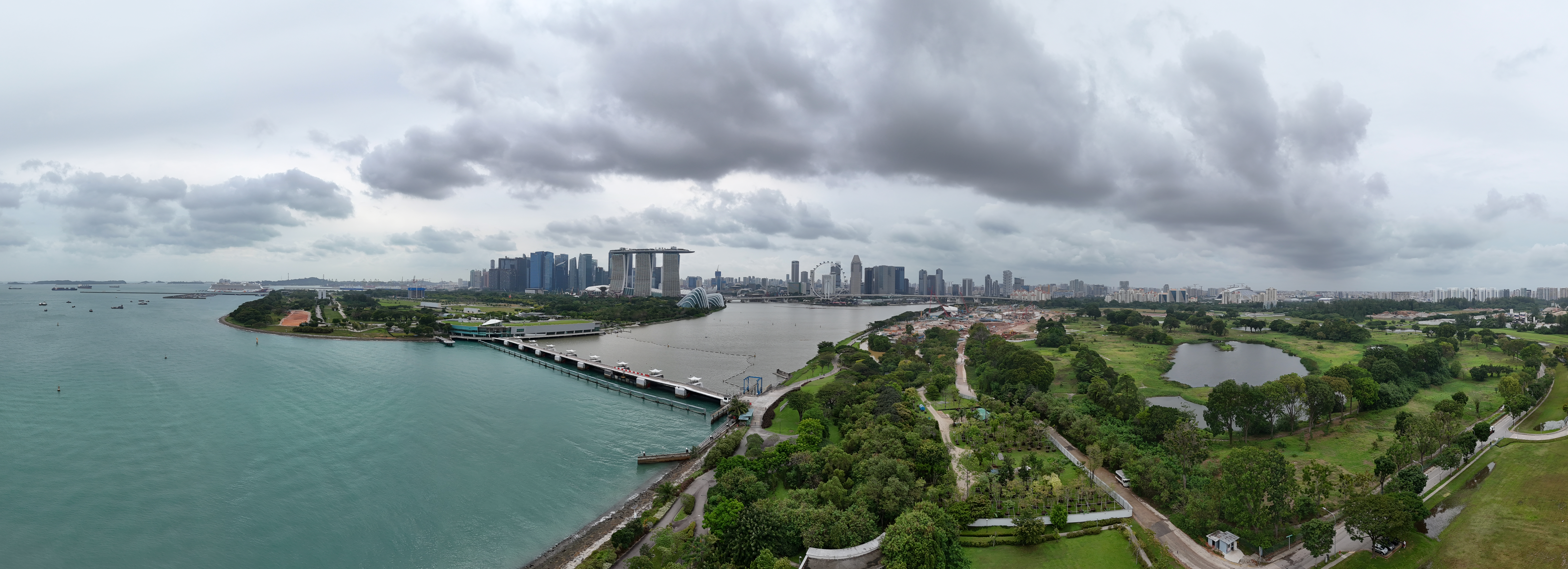
View from Marina Barrage from Marina East

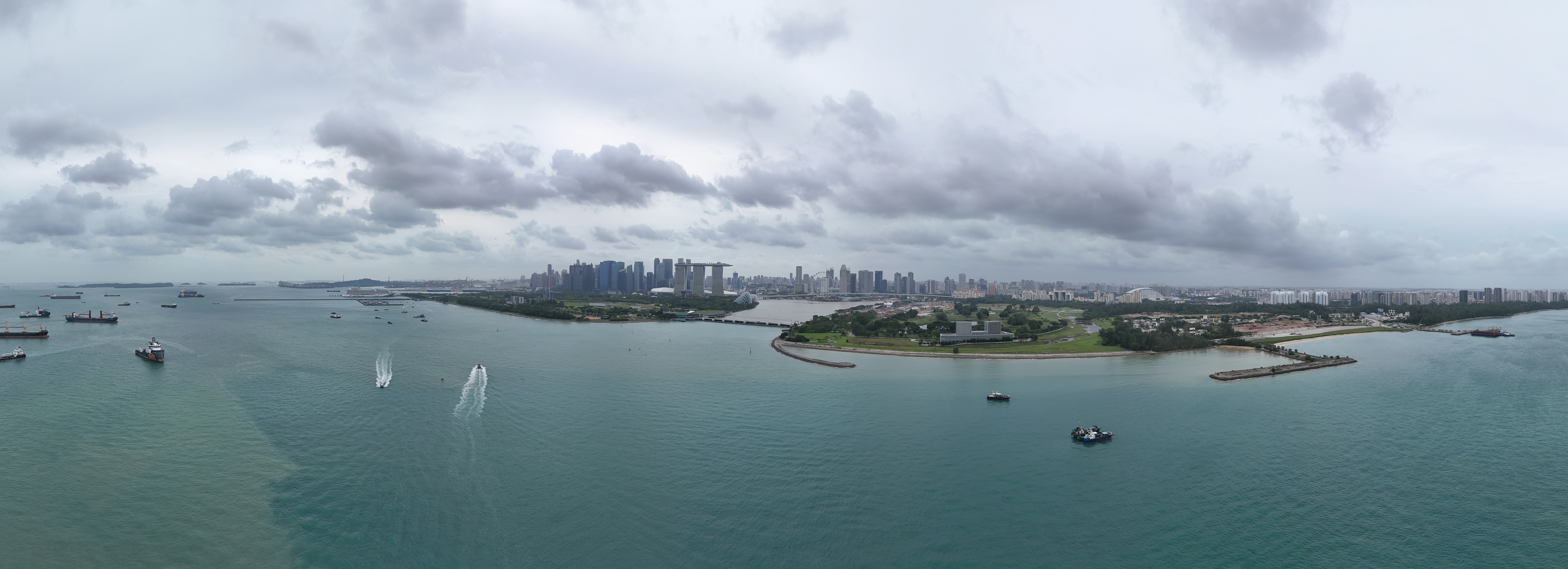
The Singapore Strait overlooking Singapore's southern coastline

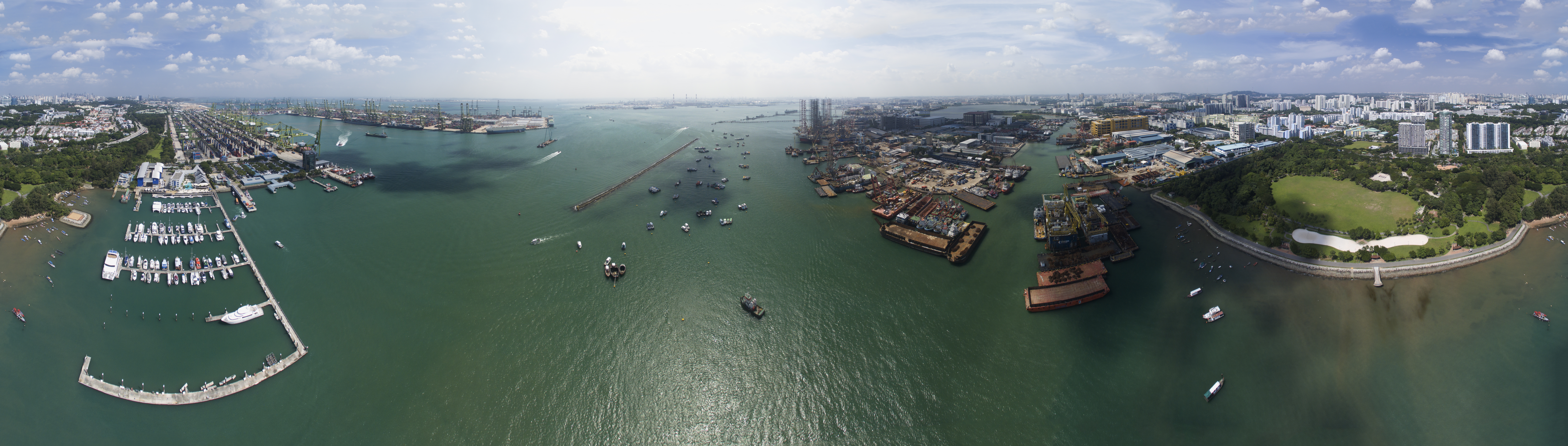
Aerial panorama of the Singapore Strait and the Pasir Panjang Port Terminal, 2016

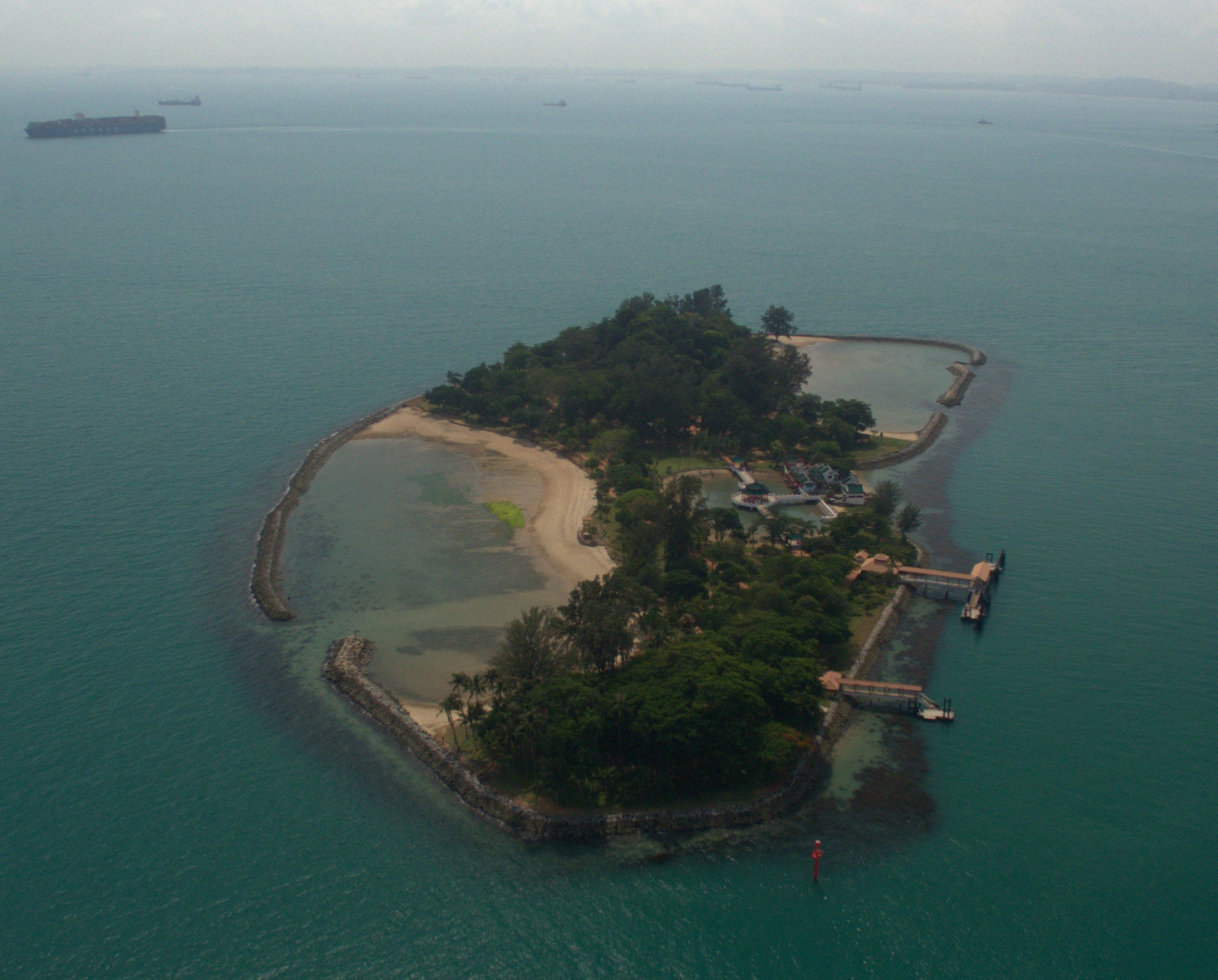
Aerial perspective of Kusu Island, one of the southern islands found in the Singapore Straits, 2016

The 9th century AD Muslim author Ya'qubi referred a Bahr Salahit or Sea of Salahit (from the Malay selat meaning strait), one of the Seven Seas to be traversed to reach China. Some have interpreted Sea of Salahit as referring to Singapore, although others generally considered it the Malacca Strait, a point of contact between the Arabs and the Zābaj (likely Sumatra). Among early Europeans travellers to South East Asia, the Strait of Singapore may refer to the whole or the southern portion of the Strait of Malacca as well as other stretches of water. Historians also used the term in plural, "Singapore Straits", to refer to three or four different straits found in recorded in old texts and maps – the Old Strait of Singapore between Sentosa and Telok Blangah, the New Strait of Singapore southwest of Sentosa, the "Governor's Strait" or "Strait of John de Silva" which corresponds to Phillip Channel, and the Tebrau Strait. Today the Singapore Strait refers to the main channel of waterway south of Singapore where the international border between Singapore and Indonesia is located.

== Extent ==
The International Hydrographic Organization defined the limits of the Singapore Strait in 1953 as follows:

On the West. The Eastern limit of Malacca Strait [A line joining Tanjong Piai (Bulus), the Southern extremity of the Malay Peninsula (1°16′N 103°31′E) and The Brothers (1°11.5′N 103°21′E) and thence to Klein Karimoen (1°10′N 103°23.5′E)].

On the East. A line joining Tanjong Datok, the Southeast point of Johore (1°22′N 104°17′E) through Horsburgh Reef to Pulo Koka, the Northeastern extreme of Bintan Island (1°13.5′N 104°35′E).

On the North. The Southern shore of Singapore Island, Johore Shoal and the Southeastern coast of the Malay Peninsula.

On the South. A line joining Klein Karimoen to Pulo Pemping Besar (1°06.5′N 103°47.5′E) thence along the Northern coasts of Batam and Bintan Islands to Pulo Koka.

== Pilot guides and charts ==
Pilot guides and charts of the Malacca and Singapore straits have been published for a considerable time due to the nature of the straits

== Second World War ==
The strait was mined by the British during the Second World War.

== Piracy, incidents, and accidents ==
In 2009, the Maersk Kendal was grounded on the Monggok Sebarok reef.

In 2024, ReCAAP reported targeted stealing of engine spares by pirates as unique to the Singapore and Malacca Straits, indicating the possibility of a black market.

In 2025, a major increase in piracy incidents was reported in the Singapore Straits by The International Maritime Bureau (IMB) Piracy Reporting Centre. These have included boardings and violent armed robberies of cargo ships. Over 60% of global piracy occurred in the Singapore Straits in this year.

== See also ==
- Maritime Southeast Asia
- Straits of the South China Sea
- Bay of Bengal
- Andaman Sea
- Exclusive economic zone of Indonesia
- Exclusive economic zone of Malaysia
- Piracy and armed robbery in the Singapore Strait
