= 1716 in piracy =

== Events ==
=== Caribbean ===
- Summer - Samuel Bellamy is named captain of the Mary Anne, replacing Benjamin Hornigold.
- September - John Martel's pirates rob the Berkeley and the King Solomon, taking cash and cargo worth over £1,000. They then loot two sloops off Cuba, and capture the ship John and Martha, which they convert to their own use. Martel is deposed by his crew, who elect Walter Kennedy in his place.
- October 16 - Kennedy in the John and Martha despoils Captain Evans' Greyhound Galley.
- October–December - Kennedy cruises off the Leeward Islands with the John and Martha and a sloop, taking several more prizes.
- December - The Kent is captured by pirates.

== Deaths ==
- August - Captain Halsey dies of tropical fever
