= Regional Cooperation Agreement on Combating Piracy and Armed Robbery against Ships in Asia =

Multilateral treaty

Regional Cooperation Agreement on Combating Piracy and Armed Robbery against Ships in Asia - Information Sharing Centre
- Logo of the Regional Cooperation Agreement on Combating Piracy and Armed Robbery against Ships in Asia - Information Sharing Centre
- Abbreviation: ReCAAP ISC
- Formation: 29 November 2006 (19 years ago)
- Type: International organization
- Purpose: Anti-piracy
- Headquarters: Singapore
- Coordinates: 1.2923863°N 103.792483°E
- Region served: Asia
- Members: 20 Contracting Parties
- Executive Director: Vijay D Chafekar
- Website: www.recaap.org

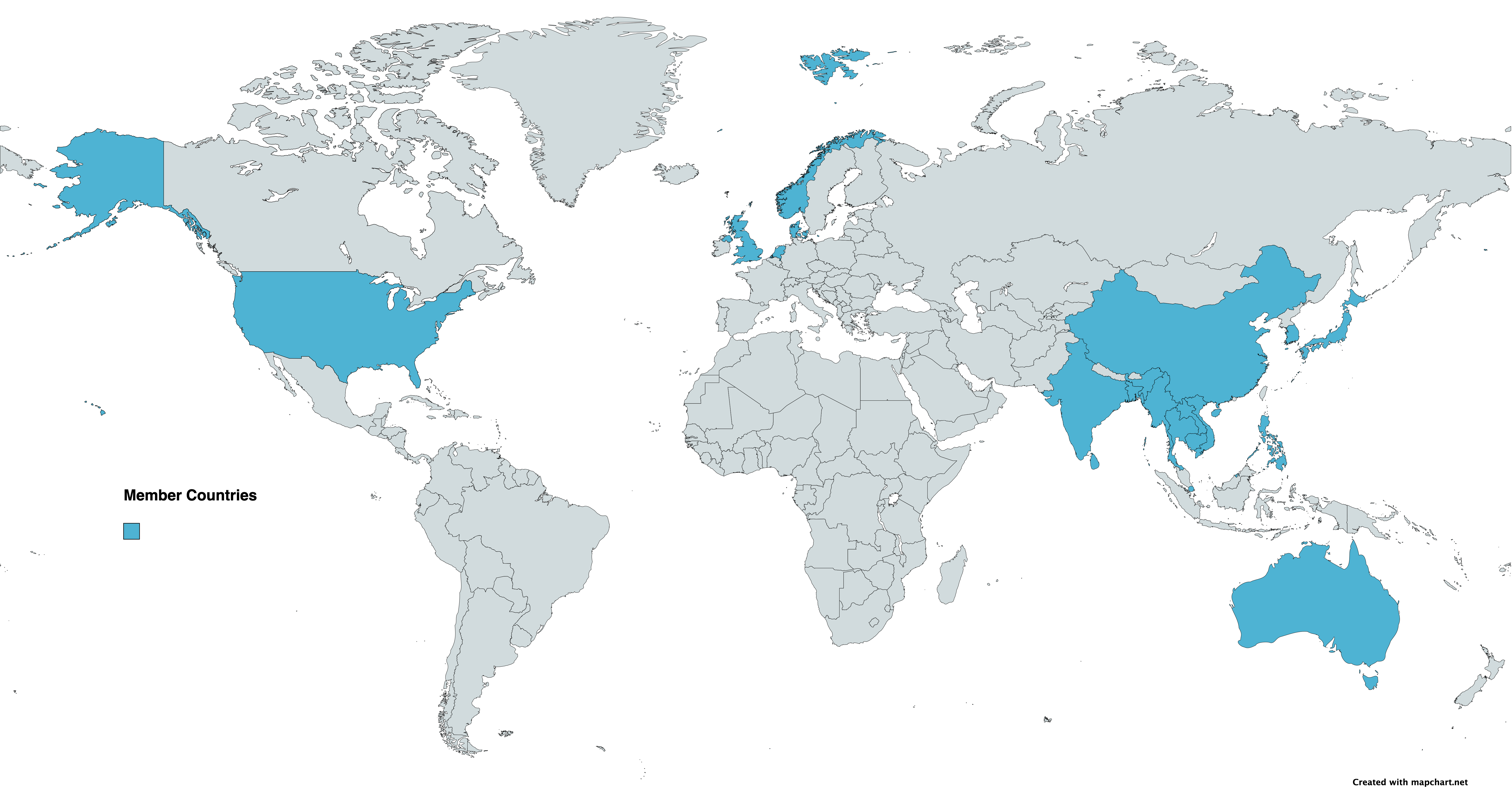
List of Countries In ReCAAP

The Regional Cooperation Agreement on Combating Piracy and Armed Robbery against Ships in Asia, abbreviated as ReCAAP or RECAAP, is a multilateral agreement between 16 countries in Asia, concluded in November 2004 and includes the RECAAP Information Sharing Centre (ISC), an initiative for facilitating the dissemination of piracy-related information.

To date, twenty-one countries in various parts of the world have ratified the ReCAAP agreement.

== ReCAAP History ==
The Regional Cooperation Agreement on Combating Piracy and Armed Robbery against Ships in Asia (ReCAAP) is the first regional government-to-government agreement to promote and enhance cooperation against piracy and armed robbery against ships in Asia. ReCAAP ISC was proposed in 1989 as a result of shared concern specifically related to cases of piracy and armed robbery, and it came into force in November 2006 after further ratification by member states. In January 2026, United States President Donald Trump announced that the United States would withdraw from the organization.

The 29 Contracting Parties of ReCAAP: (As of January 2026)

Australia	Bangladesh	Brunei
Cambodia	China	Denmark
Germany	India	Japan
South Korea	Laos	Myanmar
Netherlands	Norway	Philippines
Singapore	Sri Lanka	Thailand
United Kingdom	Vietnam	

== The Structure of ReCAAP ==
ReCAAP was established as a decentralized security network, which included the formation of an Information Security Center (ISC) and a Governing Council. The ISC also serves as a platform for information exchange with the ReCAAP Focal Points via the Information Network System (IFN). The Governing Council consists of one representative from each contracting member and is tasked with overseeing a focal point and managing the ISC's procedures.

== ReCAAP Information Sharing Centre (ISC) ==
The ReCAAP Information Sharing Centre (ReCAAP ISC) was established under the Agreement and was officially launched on 29 November 2006 in Singapore. Krishnaswami Natrajan is the current executive director.

The emergence of the ISC has created the interaction to minimize the acts of piracy and robbery to occur in maritime security territory. It provides epistemic analysis assistance to prevent and improve the ability of the authorities to deal with the issues of piracy through three pillars: Sharing regional security information, capacity building measures, and cooperative arrangement planning.

=== Information Sharing ===
The ReCAAP ISC conducts timely and accurate information sharing on incidents of piracy and sea robbery. The ReCAAP ISC manages a network of information sharing with the Focal Points of Contracting Parties on 24/7 basis. Through this information sharing, the ReCAAP ISC can issue warnings and alerts to the shipping industry and facilitate the responses by the law enforcement agencies of littoral states. Based on the detailed information of incidents collected, verified and collated, the ReCAAP ISC provides accurate statistics and analysis of the piracy and armed robbery situation in Asia by its periodical reports (weekly, monthly, quarterly, half-yearly and annual reports).

Information sharing mainly refers to:

- The formation of a decentralized security network simplifying communication between the ISC and the Focal Points
- The launch of an IFN mobile app in 2014 to increase the accessibility of reporting incidents
- The publication of reports, alerts and updates, as well as forums and conferences from accurate reporting by Focal Points

=== Capacity Building ===
In order to strengthen its network of information sharing, the ReCAAP ISC conducts capacity building activities of the Focal Points of the Contracting Parties through the training of their reporting skill, sharing best practices, updating the situation of piracy and armed robbery. It also facilitates the Focal Points to promote cooperation with other governmental agencies and shipping industry. The representatives that make up the Governing Council are tasked with overseeing a specific focal point and foster the ISC's procedures.

=== Cooperative Arrangements ===
The ReCAAP ISC promotes cooperation with other regional and international organisations (governmental organisations and shipping associations) to share information and best practices and to enhance its network in order to address the piracy and armed robbery collectively. It has signed documents of cooperation with like-minded organisations such as IMO, INTERPOL, BIMCO, INTERTANKO, ASA, IFC and the Djibouti Code of Conduct (DCoC).

Cooperative arrangements can, for example, include workshops where the contracting members share best practices and experiences.

== Evaluation of Incidents ==
ReCAAP's periodical reports document the severity levels and locations of the accidents, highlight case studies to recognize patterns and trends, and share best practices for safety precautions.

The ISC evaluates the significance of all incidents in terms of two considerations: the level of violence (including the use of weapons, the treatment of the crew, and the number of pirates/robbers involved), and the level of economics (including the type of property that has been impacted by an assault).

Based on the matrix of indicators of the Violence, -, and Economic factors, ReCAAP ISC essentially categorizes all incidents into one of four groups

The four classifications of incidents are as follows:

- CAT 1 (Most severe incidents): Involves more than 9 men as perpetrators in which they mostly are armed. The crew is also likely to suffer physical violence, and the ship is either hijacked or the cargo is stolen.
- CAT 2 – Involves around 4-9 men. They are likely to be armed and the crew is likely to be threatened. In some cases, the crew suffers physical violence. The perpetrators may steal cash or property.
- CAT 3 – Involves around 1-6 men. The perpetrators are sometimes armed, but the crew does not usually suffer from physical violence. In most cases, the perpetrators are unable to steal anything from the ship or cargo.
- CAT 4 – (Less severe incidents): Involves around 1-3 men. The perpetrators are not armed, and the crew are not harmed. Perpetrators escape empty-handed.

This categorization of occurrences enables the ReCAAP ISC to provide some context to the pirate and armed robbery situation in Asia, as well as to assist the maritime community in risk analysis.
