= International Maritime Bureau =

Crime-fighting department of the International Chamber of Commerce

- ICC International Maritime Bureau
- Abbreviation: IMB
- Formation: 1981
- Type: Nonprofit
- Location: London, UK
- Director: Michael Howlett
- Parent organization: International Chamber of Commerce (ICC)
- Website: icc-ccs.org/imb/

The International Maritime Bureau (IMB) is a specialized department of the International Chamber of Commerce (ICC).

The IMB's responsibilities lie in fighting crimes related to maritime trade and transportation, particularly piracy and commercial fraud, and in protecting the crews of ocean-going vessels. It publishes a weekly piracy report and maintains a 24-hour piracy reporting centre in Kuala Lumpur, Malaysia.

The IMB is a division of ICC Commercial Crime Services. Its other bureaus include Counterfeiting Intelligence, Financial Investigation, and FraudNet, which, in2025, has 126 attorney members in 81 jurisdictions.

FraudNet is the world's leading network of fraud and asset recovery lawyers with 63 lawyers in 56 different jurisdictions.

The bureau, endorsed by the United Nations' International Maritime Organisation, was founded in 1981. The body has observer status with Interpol and a memorandum of understanding with the World Customs Organization.
