= Flag of Blackbeard =

Purported flag of the pirate Edward Teach

Blackbeard
- Modern fictional flag of Blackbeard
- Use: Small vexillological symbol or pictogram in black and white showing the different uses of the flag
- Proportion: 3×2
- Design: A black banner with a horned skeleton holding an hourglass in his right hand and a spear in his left, using the spear to poke at a red heart dripping three red drops of blood

The purported flag of Blackbeard, a variant of the "Old Roger design", consisting of a horned skeleton holding an hourglass and using a spear to pierce a bleeding heart, is typically attributed to the pirate Edward Teach, better known as Blackbeard. However, contrary to popular belief, there is no accurate description of any specific flag used by Blackbeard during his piracy beyond using "bloody flags" or black flags with "deaths heads". Records from as early as 1723 report a flag of the same or very similar design to have been used by pirates, but not by Blackbeard in particular.

== History ==
=== Historical flags ===
Near the end of the Golden Age of Piracy, Blackbeard (c. 1680 – 1718) was one of the most infamous pirates on the seas. The only record of what flag he flew was in a 1718 newspaper report describing an attack by his flagship Queen Anne's Revenge on the Protestant Caesar: "On the morning of the [8th of April] a large Ship and a sloop with Black Flags and Deaths Heads in them and three more sloops with Bloody Flags all bore down upon the said ship Protestant Caesar".

Death's head flag

Bloody flag

=== Modern design ===
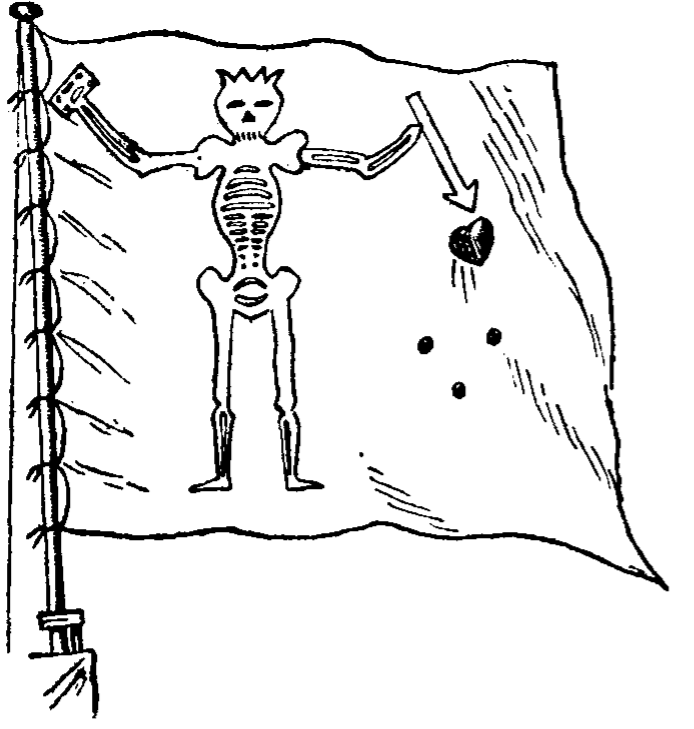
A depiction of the Old Roger flag from The Mariner's Mirror which depicts the skeleton wearing a crown.

Following a revival in interest in piracy in the 20th century, the flag with the horned skeleton and bleeding heart first appeared in an article in The Mariner's Mirror magazine as a general pirate's flag in 1912, but the article made no assertion of it being Blackbeard's flag. Later in the century approximately around the 1970s it started to be described as Blackbeard's flag and was often used as such in books and television programmes portraying him. Some academic institutions such as the Smithsonian have also incorrectly described it as the flag of Blackbeard.

The design of the modern flag consisted of a horned skeleton raising an hourglass "toasting the Devil" in its right hand. In the skeleton's left hand, it held a spear pointing towards a red heart which had three drops of red blood below it, supposedly to signal that no quarter would be given. The historian E. T. Fox affirmed that this flag design would not have been of 18th-century pirate origin because, if the skeleton was meant to represent the Devil, then it would not have been a skeleton, and if it was supposed to represent Death, then it would not have been horned. Most pirate flags at the time would have used simple imagery based on Christian symbols of mortality. Flags of a similar design had been used by Edward Low, Francis Spriggs and Charles Harris.

Since the 2010s, the flag and its modifications have gained popularity in military circles. A patch with the design was worn by the suspect in the 2026 Kraków shooting.

== See also ==
- Jolly Roger
- Bloody flag
- Old Roger (Jolly Roger)
- Forward Observations Group

== Literature ==
- Fox, E.T. (2015). Jolly Rogers, the True History of Pirate Flags. ISBN 978-1-326-44817-2
