= Charles Harris (pirate) =

English pirate

Charles Harris (c. 1698–1723) was an English pirate active in the 1720s. He is best known for his association with George Lowther and Edward Low.

== History ==
Harris was ship's mate and navigator aboard the logwood hauler Greyhound in January 1722 when it was seized by pirate George Lowther aboard the Happy Delivery between Honduras and Boston. The Greyhound’s captain Benjamin Edward fought Lowther for a time but eventually surrendered. In retaliation for their resistance the pirates killed many of the Greyhound’s crew; the remainder were forced aboard the Happy Delivery. Unlike most of the crew, Charles Harris willingly signed Lowther's Articles to join his pirates.

Lowther soon gave Harris command of a small prize ship, while granting another captaincy (the brigantine Rebecca) to Lowther's own lieutenant Edward Low. Harris and Low sailed in concert with Lowther for a time; Harris's ship was lost at sea and he came aboard Low's ship. When Low deserted Lowther in May 1722, Harris left with him, along with Lowther's quartermaster Francis Spriggs. Harris was with Low and Low's new quartermaster John Russell in June 1722 when they forced Philip Ashton into service; Ashton would become a famous castaway when he escaped from Low a year later. In July 1722 near Nova Scotia Low captured an 80-ton schooner which he renamed Fancy. Low took command of the Fancy and scuttled the Rebecca.

Soon afterward they sailed for the Azores, where they captured a pink which Low took command of and renamed Rose Pink. While Low had the Rose Pink he gave command of the Fancy to Harris. Inexperience in careening led to the loss of the Rose Pink. Low took back the Fancy, sailing to Grenada and capturing a small ship named Squirrel, then a French sloop renamed Ranger. Low gave the Squirrel to Francis Spriggs, who soon quarreled with Low and left the group. Low then gave the Ranger to Harris and they sailed for the Carolinas and up the American coast.

Off Delaware Bay on June 10, 1723, Low and Harris pursued a fleeing merchantman. The vessel turned out to be the British 20-gun Man-of-War Greyhound under Captain Peter Solgard. Low's 70-man, 10-gun Fancy and Harris’ 50-man, 8-gun Ranger fought a lengthy running battle (the “Action of 10 June 1723”) against the man-of-war, which chased them down via sail and oar. When the Ranger became crippled, Low abandoned Harris and escaped. One desperate pirate tried to blow up the Ranger rather than risk capture but was stopped and committed suicide instead.

Harris and the survivors from Ranger were taken to stand trial in Newport, Rhode Island. Most were found guilty; amid a public spectacle, Harris and over 25 others were hanged July 19, 1723 after a lengthy sermon from Cotton Mather. To this day it remains the largest mass execution in Rhode Island history. Low, already notorious for his cruelty, was said to have become even more so after Harris' capture.

== Flag ==
Pirate Flag of Low, Spriggs, Harris, and others

Harris flew the same “Old Roger” flag as Low and Spriggs. According to Captain Charles Johnson:

“A Day or two after they parted, Spriggs was chosen Captain by the rest, and a black Ensign was made, which they called Jolly Roger, with the same Device that Captain Low carried, viz. a white Skeliton in the Middle of it, with a Dart in one Hand striking a bleeding Heart, and in the other, an Hour-Glass; when this was finished and hoisted, they fired all their Guns to salute their Captain and themselves, and then looked out for Prey.”

And from a local newspaper article on execution day:

"Their Black Flag, with the Pourtrature of Death having an Hour-Glass in one Hand, and a Dart in the other, at the end of which was the Form of a Heart with three Drops of Blood, falling from it, was affix’d at one Corner of the Gallows. This Flag they call’d Old Roger, and often used to say they would live and die under it."

A blue version of Harris' flag.

Yet another source claims Harris's flag used the same design, but on a blue field instead of black:

"...under their own deep Blew Flagg which was hoisted up on their Gallows, and had pourtraied on the middle of it, an Anatomy with an Hour-Glass in one hand, and a dart in the Heart with 3 drops of blood proceeding from it, in the other."

== See also ==
- Thomas Pound, Thomas Hawkins, and William Coward - three other convicted New England pirates ministered to by a (somewhat younger) Cotton Mather.
