= Richard Shipton =

Pirate active in the Caribbean

- Disappeared: 1726 (possibly captured); Cuba
- Occupation: Pirate
- Piratical career
- Commands: Merry Christmas, Royal Fortune, York, John and Mary

Richard Shipton (died 1726?; last name occasionally spelled Skipton) was a pirate active in the Caribbean, best known for sailing alongside Edward Low and Francis Spriggs. In 1723, Shipton was elected captain of Merry Christmas, and he subsequently captained ships such as Royal Fortune, York, and John and Mary. Forced to beach his vessel on western Cuba by pirate hunters, in early 1726, he was found ashore in his bed and presumed to have died shortly afterwards.

== History ==
Shipton was a crewman serving under notoriously cruel captain Edward Low, who had captured the merchant ship Merry Christmas in 1723. Rejoining briefly with George Lowther, who had once been Low's own captain, they took the Delight off the Guinea coast and gave it to Francis Spriggs to command. Two nights later, Lowther and Spriggs abandoned Low. Shortly afterwards, Low killed the ship's quartermaster while he slept, infuriating the crew. They placed Low and his supporters in a small French sloop they'd taken near Martinique and set them adrift. Shipton was then elected captain of Merry Christmas.

By June 1724, Shipton and Merry Christmas returned to the Caribbean and rejoined forces with Spriggs onboard Delight. They put into a small island to careen, where Shipton burned Merry Christmas and transferred to the captured sloop Royal Fortune. After Spriggs and Shipton took several more vessels near Belize, Shipton transferred to the newly rearmed prize ship York.

HMS Diamond, under commander James Windham, had heard rumours about Spriggs and Shipton's piracies and sailed to Belize to investigate. Drawing them out, Diamond fought both pirates in a desperate but inconclusive action in August 1724. The pair sailed north, taking ships off South Carolina before returning to the Bay of Honduras. Here Shipton took another vessel, John and Mary, forcing its crew to follow him back to Roatán. The prize crew mutinied, killing the pirates Shipton left on the prize and sailing back to Newport, Rhode Island, where they were tried and exonerated.

After plundering several more vessels alongside Joseph Cooper, Shipton met Diamond once more, alongside HMS Spence, a captured Spanish ship manned by Diamond's crew. Spriggs managed to escape again, and Cooper blew himself up rather than face capture, but Shipton was forced to beach his vessel on western Cuba and flee inland with his remaining crew – thought to number only 13 men, nine white and four black. Diamond and Spence were still hunting them, and in early 1726 they found both Spriggs and Shipton ashore. The English vessels island-hopped, landing soldiers ashore who captured Shipton - found in his bed - and almost all of Spriggs' men. Shipton is presumed to have died shortly afterwards, though Spriggs may have gotten away.

== See also ==
- Philip Ashton, a sailor forced into service by Edward Low who later escaped and survived as a castaway for more than a year. His story intertwines with Spriggs and Shipton, who stopped near Roatan and captured ships in the area.
