= Ann Glover =

Last person who was hanged as a witch in Boston

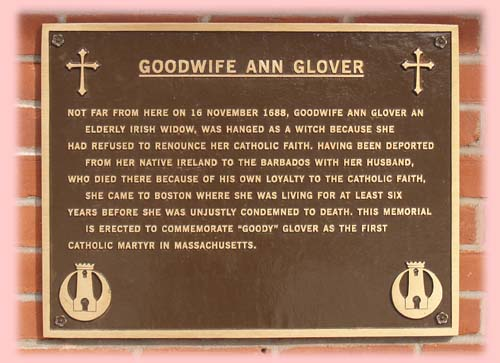
- A memorial in the North End of Boston to Glover, calling her "the first Catholic martyr in Massachusetts"
- Died: November 16, 1688; Boston, Massachusetts
- Known for: The last person to be hanged in Boston for witchcraft

Goody Ann Glover (died November 16, 1688) was an Irish former indentured servant and the last person to be hanged in Boston as a witch, although the Salem witch trials in nearby Salem, Massachusetts, occurred mainly in 1692.

== Early life and accounts ==
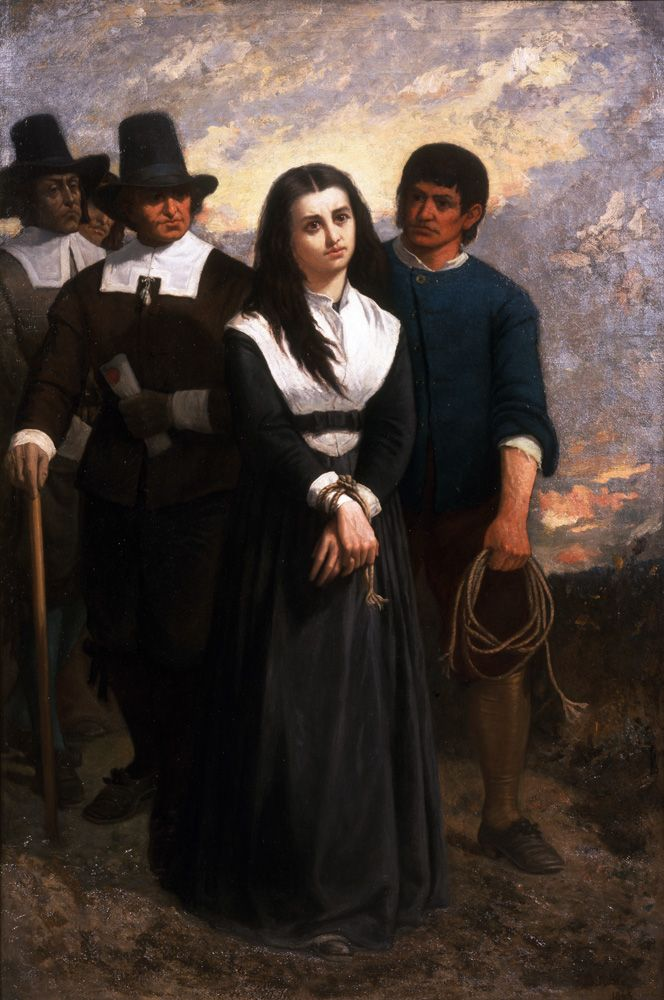
The painting Witch Hill (The Salem Martyr), depicting an accused "witch" late 17th century

The trial of Ann Glover cannot be found in official records perhaps because it occurred during the brief and controversial Dominion of New England under the royally appointed governor Edmund Andros.

There are four primary contemporary sources for the accusations against Glover and her execution:

- 1 - Cotton Mather's Memorable Providences (1689) Mather's book is the most extensive treatment of the trial and includes a "Notandum" at the end written after the execution of Glover and Mather reports that the children Glover had supposedly bewitched continued to suffer "renewal of their afflictions." But Mather concludes that the meaning of this is "not to disappoint our expectations of their deliverance, but for the detection and destruction of more belonging to that hellish knot."
- 2 - The diary of Judge Samuel Sewall is important as the only source that dates her execution and lists some of the persons involved, acting under the Dominion government. "The widow Glover is drawn by to be hanged. Mr. Larkin seems to be Marshal. The Constables attend, and Justice Bullivant there."
- 3 - Joshua Moody's account in his letter to Increase Mather, dated the 4 October 1688.
- 4 - More Wonders of the Invisible World, written by Boston merchant Robert Calef (1700) Calef accuses Mather of being the "most active and forward of any minister in the country of those matters...and after printing such an account of the whole... conduced much to the kindling those flames that in [1692] threatened the devouring this country."

There are numerous sources that considerably post-date events, including Fr. James Fitton's account in 1872, Rev. Sherwood Healy (1876), Bernard Corr (1891), and Harold Dijon (1905), George Francis O'Dwyer (1921), Michael O'Brien (1937), John Henry Cutler (1962), Rev. Vincent A. Lapomarda (1989–90), Margaret E. Fitzgerald and Joseph A. King (1990), White Cargo (2008), Alan Titley (2011–14), Prof. Robert Allison of Suffolk University, Boston (2014).

All that can be said of her early life is that she was possibly born in Ireland, that her name is of English origin, and that she was transported to Barbados after Cromwell's invasion of Ireland.

== Life in Boston ==
By 1680, Ann and her daughter Mary were living in Boston—at the time, part of the Massachusetts Bay Colony—where they worked as housekeepers for John Goodwin. In the summer of 1688, Martha Goodwin (age 13) accused Ann Glover's daughter of stealing laundry. This caused Ann to have a fierce argument with Martha and the Goodwin children, which then supposedly caused them to become ill and to start acting strangely. The doctor who was called suggested it was caused by witchcraft, because he could not offer another diagnosis or heal the children. Martha and the other children seemed to be "bewitched."

Glover was arrested and tried for witchcraft. Her answers could not be understood, and for a time her accusers thought she was speaking a language of the devil, but it became clear that this was not the case. In the words of her leading accuser, the Reverend Cotton Mather, "the court could have no answer from her but in the Irish which was her native language..." (Memorable Providence, 1689). By that time she had apparently lost the ability to speak English, though she could still understand it. An interpreter was found for her and the trial proceeded.

Cotton Mather wrote that Glover was "a scandalous old Irishwoman, very poor, a Roman Catholic and obstinate in idolatry." At her trial it was demanded of her to say the Lord's Prayer. She recited it in Irish and broken Latin, but was unable to say it in English. There was a belief that an inability to recite the Lord's prayer was the mark of a witch. Her house was searched and "small images" or doll-like figures were found. When Mather was interrogating her she supposedly said that she prayed to a host of spirits and Mather took this to mean that these spirits were demons. Many of the accusations against Ann used spectral evidence, which cannot be proven. Cotton Mather visited Glover in prison where he said that she supposedly engaged in night-time trysts with the devil and other evil spirits. It was considered that Ann might not be of sound mind and could possibly be mentally ill. Five of the six physicians who examined her found her to be competent. She was therefore pronounced guilty and put to death by hanging.

On November 16, 1688, Glover was hanged in Boston amid mocking shouts from the crowd. When she was taken out to be hanged she said that her death would not relieve the children of their malady. There are several testaments as to her final words. According to some she said that the children would keep suffering because she was not the only witch to have afflicted them, but when asked to name the other witches, she refused. Another account says that Glover said that killing her would be useless because it was someone else who had bewitched the children. Either way, Ann Glover did believe in witches. A Boston merchant who knew her, Robert Calef, said that "Goody Glover was a despised, crazy, poor old woman, an Irish Catholic who was tried for afflicting the Goodwin children. Her behavior at her trial was like that of one distracted. They did her cruel. The proof against her was wholly deficient. The jury brought her guilty. She was hung. She died a Catholic."

The evidence adduced against her is open to question. When Glover told Mather that she prayed to a host of spirits she may have been talking about Catholic saints. The dolls she had in her possession and which were believed to have been used for witchcraft might actually have been crude representations of Catholic saints. The majority of the population at that time and place was Puritan, and there was Puritan prejudice against Catholics.

One contemporary writer recorded that, "There was a great concourse of people to see if the Papist would relent, her one cat was there, fearsome to see. They would to destroy the cat, but Mr. Calef would not permit it. Before her executioners she was bold and impudent, making to forgive her accusers and those who put her off. She predicted that her death would not relieve the children saying that it was not she that afflicted them."

Ann's daughter Mary reportedly suffered a mental break from the strain of her mother's trial: "her mind gave way under the strain," and she ended her days "a raving maniac." She was likely the same "Mary Glover the Irish Catholic Witch" who was imprisoned in Boston alongside convicted pirates Thomas Hawkins, Thomas Pound, and William Coward (whose trial shared some of the same judges as Ann Glover's, and who were also ministered to by Cotton Mather) in late 1689.

== Legacy ==
Three hundred years later in 1988, the Boston City Council proclaimed November 16 as Goody Glover Day. She is the only victim of the witchcraft hysteria in the Massachusetts Bay Colony to receive such a tribute. Glover's accusations and death occurred before the better known Salem Witch Trials in Massachusetts and her trial would become the basis for many of the cases in the 1692 Salem witch trials.

== See also ==
- List of people executed for witchcraft
- Salem witch trials
