= John Quelch (pirate) =

English pirate

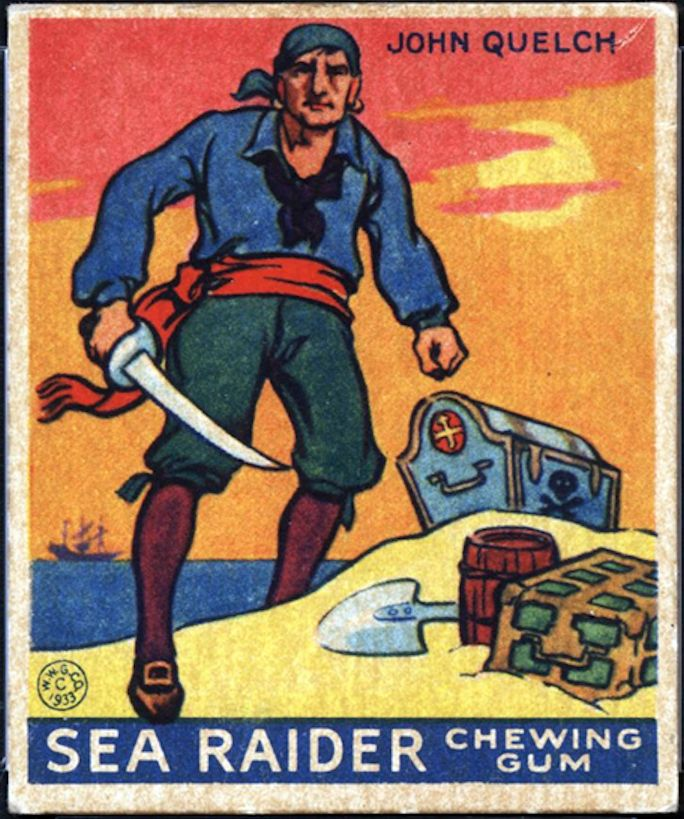
- Born: c. 1666; London
- Died: 30 June 1704 (aged 38); Boston
- Piratical career
- Years active: 1703–1704
- Rank: Captain
- Base of operations: Marblehead
- Commands: Charles
- Wealth: £10,000 sterling

John Quelch (c. 1666 – 30 June 1704) was an English pirate who had a lucrative but very brief career of about one year. His chief claim to historical significance is that he was the first person to be tried for piracy outside England under Admiralty Law and thus without a jury. These Admiralty courts had been instituted to tackle the rise of piracy in colonial ports where civil and criminal courts had proved ineffective.

== Pirate career ==
In July 1703, Governor Joseph Dudley of Boston sent out Captain Daniel Plowman of the Charles with a privateering license to attack French and Spanish ships off the coast of Newfoundland and Arcadia. John Quelch was Plowman's lieutenant. Before leaving Marblehead, Massachusetts, the Charles's crew under Quartermaster Anthony Holding mutinied and locked the ailing Plowman in his cabin. The crew elected Quelch the captain, who turned the Charles south. Plowman was thrown overboard, although it was never established whether he was dead or alive at that moment.

The crew plundered nine Portuguese ships off the coast of Brazil and gained a large sum of money, even though England and Portugal were at peace at the time. As a result, The Charles contained large amounts of Brazilian sugar, hides, cloth, guns, gold dust and coins with a value estimated at over £10,000 sterling (£1.92 million as of 2025). Before their capture, legend says the crew buried some of the gold on Star Island off the coast of New Hampshire. In the 1800s some gold coins were found hidden in a stone wall there.

== Death ==
When the Charles returned to Marblehead 10 months later, the crewmen dispersed with their plunder. Some sailed with pirate and former privateer Thomas Larimore, who was also captured shortly afterward. Within a week, Quelch was in jail because the Portuguese were not in his letter of marque and, more importantly, Queen Anne and the King of Portugal had become allies. He and other crew members were taken to Boston to be tried. This was the first admiralty trial outside England. It was called by one historian "the first case of judicial murder in America."

Following their conviction, on Friday, 30 June 1704, the pirates were marched on foot through Boston to Scarlet's Wharf accompanied by a guard of musketeers, various officials, and two ministers, and following a silver oar, the emblem of the Lord High Admiral. Upon reaching the gallows, the minister (reportedly Cotton Mather) gave a long and fervent sermon. All of the pirates showed repentance except Captain Quelch. Before he was hanged, Quelch stepped up while holding his hat, bowed to the spectators and gave a short address, warning them, "They should take care how they brought Money into New England to be Hanged for it." Their bodies were buried between the tide marks.

== Charles ==
The Charles was an eighty-ton vessel built in Boston between 1701 and 1703. It was owned by some of the most prominent people in Boston and was equipped to go privateering off the coast of Newfoundland and Arcadia.

John Quelch's standard, the Flag of St. George

=== Crew ===
Here follows a list of all the known crewmembers aboard the Charles while Quelch was captain.

- Austin, James
- Breck, John
- Carter, Dennis
- Carter, John
- Chevalle, Daniel
- Clifford, John
- Chuley, Daniel
- Davis, Gabriel
- Dorothy, John
- Dunbar, Nicholas
- Farrington, Thomas
- Giddens, Paul
- Harwood, John
- Holding, Anthony
- Hutnot, Joseph
- James, Charles
- Johnson, Isaac
- Jones, William
- King, Charles
- King, Francis
- King, John
- Lambert, John
- Lawson, Nicholas
- Lawrence, Richard
- Miller, John
- Norton, George
- Pierse, George
- Perkins, Benjamin
- Parrot, James
- Pattison, James
- Perkins, Benjamin
- Peterson, Erasmus
- Pitman, John
- Pimer, Matthew
- Quelch, Captain John
- Quittance, John
- Rayner, William
- Richardson, Nicholas
- Roach, Peter
- Scudamore, Christopher
- Templeton, John
- Thurbar, Richard
- Whiting, William
- Way, John
- Wiles, William

Six of the above, including Quelch, were hanged. More than half escaped capture. Parrot, Clifford, and Pimer had turned Queen's evidence and escaped prosecution. John Templeton was found to be only a servant on the ship and was not even 14, so was released.

=== Old Roger ===
Old Roger

Popular myth has it that John Quelch flew a pirate flag referred to as Old Roger by his crew. It is sometimes considered to be the origin of the name Jolly Roger. It is alleged that his theme was later borrowed by Blackbeard and also Bartholomew "Black Bart" Roberts. There is no evidence whatsoever that Quelch flew any flag other than the Flag of St. George or possibly a privateer's flag of St. George quartered on a red background similar to today's British merchant colors. Courtroom testimony from the crew maintained that the flag of England had been flown at all times. The origin of this myth of Quelch's flag being described as having "in the middle of it an Anatomy with an Hourglass in one hand and a dart in the Heart with three drops of Blood proceeding from it in the other." most likely stems from the poetic license of Ralph D. Paine, a popular writer at the turn of the 20th century. None of the principals involved in the affair, not even the Governor or the prosecution, ever mentioned such colors being employed by Quelch. Flags of a similar design had been used by Edward Low, Francis Spriggs and Charles Harris.
