= Old Roger =

Old Roger may refer to:

- Satan, an old nickname for the devil
- Jolly Roger, a period name some pirates named their Jolly Roger
- Old Roger (Jolly Roger), a Jolly Roger-design depicting a skeleton holding an hourglass in one hand and a dart striking a heart in the other
