= Philip Lyne =

Pirate (died 1726)

- Flag (Jolly Roger) of pirate Philip Lyne, described as "a black silk flagg ... with the representation of a man in full proportion, with a cutlass in one hand and a pistol in the other, extended"
- Died: 1726
- Occupation: Pirate
- Known for: Cruelty and his association with Francis Spriggs
- Piratical career
- Other names: Line
- Base of operations: Newfoundland
- Commands: Sea Nymph

Philip Lyne (died 1726, last name occasionally spelled Line) was a pirate known for his cruelty and his association with Francis Spriggs.

== History ==
Francis Spriggs had been quartermaster under Edward Low until he was given a prize ship and left to go pirating on his own. Spriggs then plundered and captured a number of vessels, promoting his own quartermaster Philip Lyne to captain of the Sea Nymph with 40 men and 26-guns (ten carriage guns and sixteen swivel guns). As Spriggs had done, Lyne then left to begin his own career of piracy.

In summer 1725 Lyne was active off Newfoundland, plundering several vessels. Low and Spriggs had been known for their cruelty to prisoners, and Lyne followed suit. He took the Thomasine in June 1725, forcing five of its crew to sign his Articles before looting the ship and releasing it with only some water and rotten food left. In November 1725 they took the sloop Fancy and forced the entire crew to join them. They forced the ship's cooper to sign their Articles by beating him and threatening to behead him with an axe. Lyne burned the sloop and sailed for the Guianas.

Near Curaçao in late 1725 two pirate hunting sloops were searching for Spanish pirates but captured Lyne and the Sea Nymph instead. Many of his crew were killed in the battle. Four others were wounded but survived to be tried and hanged; some sources say as many as 18 of his crew were hanged. Lyne himself was badly wounded in the head (“had one Eye shot out, which with part of his Nose hung down his Face”) but lived to face a brief trial and conviction. In his deposition to the court he claimed to have “killed 37 masters of vessels.” He was hanged in early 1726.

== Flag ==
Philip Lyne's Jolly Roger was described in records of his trial and conviction. He and his surviving crew were marched to trial, “their Black Silk Flagg before them, with the Representation of a Man in full proportion, with a Cutlass in one Hand and a Pistol in the other, Extended.”
