= John Russell (pirate) =

18th-century Portuguese pirate

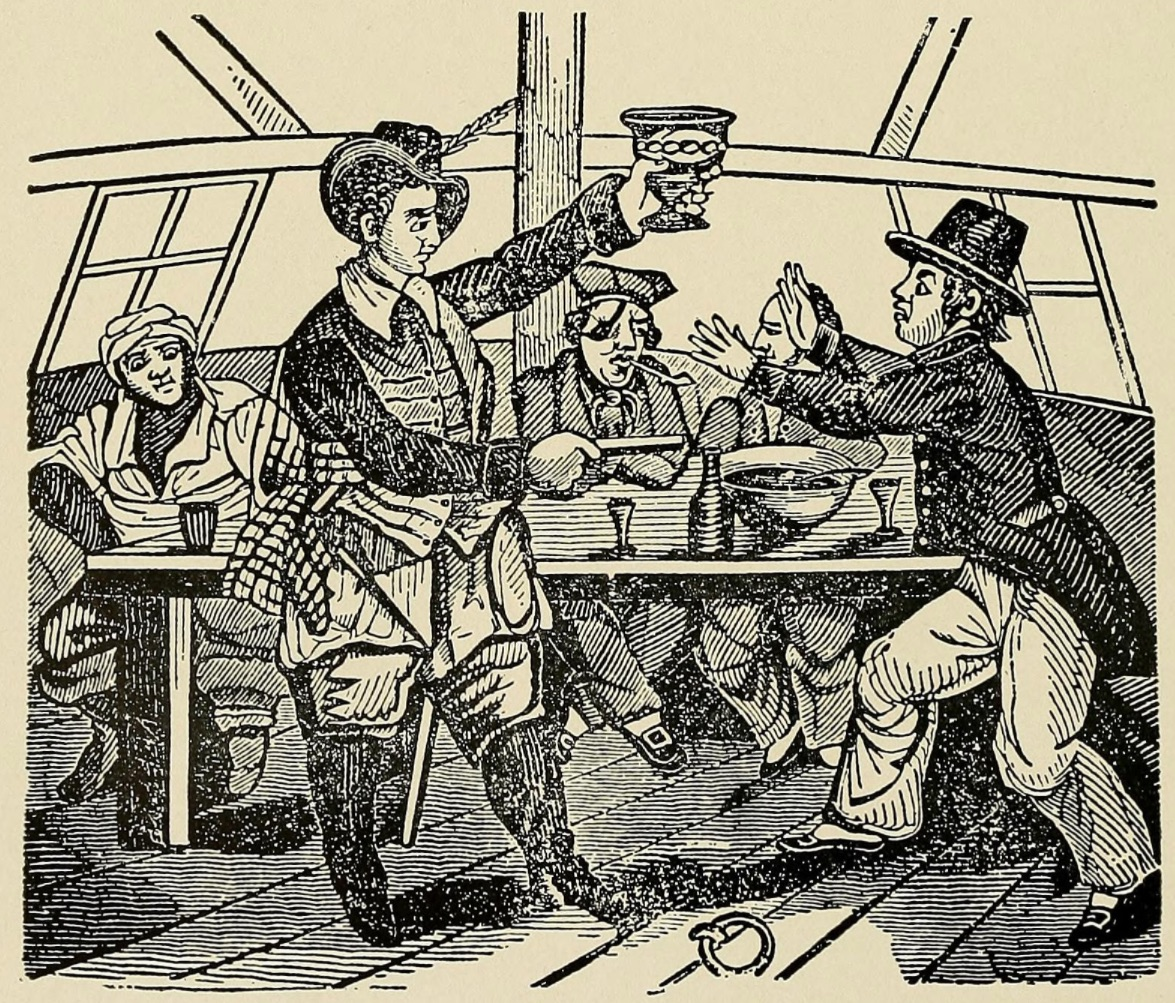
- Russell and Roberts
- Born: Juan or John Lopez
- Years active: 1722–1723
- Known for: His association with Edward Low and Francis Spriggs
- Piratical career
- Base of operations: Nova Scotia to the Caribbean to the African coast

John Russell (fl. 1722–1723) was a Portuguese pirate active from Nova Scotia to the Caribbean to the African coast. He is best known for his association with Edward Low and Francis Spriggs, and for his involvement with two well-known and well-documented maroonings.

== Biography ==
Most commonly known as Englishman “John Russell”, he was in reality a Portuguese Catholic whose real name may have been Juan or John Lopez. Like a number of other pirates of the Golden Age, he was a Jacobite who professed support for England's ousted Catholic King James II over his Protestant successors. Various sources paint him alternately as a captain in his own right, or merely as Low's quartermaster. He was argumentative and well-versed in the pirates’ Articles, not above using them to secure his own ends. Rather than fly the Jolly Roger flag, Russell instead flew English flags in order to surprise his targets.

== History ==
Russell was Edward Low's quartermaster in June 1722 when they captured a series of vessels off Shelburne, Nova Scotia, near Cape Sable. Among the sailors was Philip Ashton, whom Low forced to join his crew despite Ashton's pleas and his refusal to sign Low's articles. A few days later Low permitted two boys to take a small boat ashore to retrieve his dog; the boys ran away and an infuriated Russell accused Ashton of complicity in their escape, nearly killing Ashton several times:

I was forced to tell him, I knew not of their design; and indeed I did not, tho' I had good reason to suspect what would be the event of their going. This did not pacifie the Quarter-Master, who with outragious Cursing and Swearing clapt his Pistol to my Head, and snap'd it; but it miss'd Fire: this enraged him the more; and he repeated the snapping of his Pistol at my Head three times, and it as often miss'd Fire; upon which he held it over-board, and snap'd it the fourth time, and then it went off very readily. … The Quarter-Master upon this, in the utmost fury, drew his Cutlash, and fell upon me with it, but I leap'd down into the Hold, and got among a Crowd that was there, and so escaped the further effects of his madness and rage.

Low then sailed for the African coast where he captured ships near Cape Verde, with Spriggs sailing alongside in Low's former vessel. Among their captures in September 1722 was Captain George Roberts’ ship. Roberts described Russell as commanding one of three vessels in the pirates’ flotilla. The pirates held Roberts for over a week, during which Russell repeatedly threatened him over his refusal to join the pirates. When the crew voted to release Roberts and his boys, Russell instead argued to strip Roberts’ ship of sails, water, food, and all other useful gear before setting him free. Russell was successful, using the strict terms of their articles to make his case. Other pirate officers smuggled a few provisions to Roberts (who made it to land and endured many adventures before returning home) and warned Russell not to abuse his position: "Ay, said the Gunner, and take Care, Russell … you have got the Company's Assent in this, I cannot tell how, and therefore I shall say no more, only that I, as I believe most of the Company, came here to get Money, but not to kill, except in Fight, and not in cold Blood or for private Revenge."

Ashton escaped Russell and Low in March 1723 when they stopped near Roatan, where he was marooned for over a year. He penned his memoirs soon after his rescue. Roberts’ own account (The four years voyages of capt. George Roberts) was published in 1726 and has since been generally attributed to Daniel Defoe. Some sources dispute the Defoe attribution and maintain that Roberts’ account is trustworthy; others claim Defoe (or another author) read Ashton's Memorial and crafted Roberts’ tale as a fictionalized version of it. Both accounts feature Russell prominently.

Charles Harris, who was also a quartermaster of Low's and had captained his prize ships, was sailing alongside Low in June 1723. They engaged the Greyhound man-of-war; Harris was defeated and captured while Low made his escape. Low had earlier parted with Spriggs after an argument; Russell was not mentioned during either incident, or during the various accounts of Harris’, Low's, and Spriggs’ fates.

== See also ==
- George Lowther – the pirate captain under whom Low (and possibly Spriggs) got his start
