= Joseph Cooper (pirate) =

18th-century pirate

- Died: 1725; Bay of Honduras
- Cause of death: Used a cask of gunpowder to blow up the cabin of his ship
- Occupation: Pirate
- Known for: Sailing alongside Francis Spriggs, and for the manner of his death
- Piratical career
- Base of operations: Caribbean and the American east coast
- Commands: Night Rambler, The Night's Ramble

Joseph Cooper (died 1725) was a pirate active in the Caribbean and the American east coast. He was best known for sailing alongside Francis Spriggs, and for the manner of his death.

== History ==
Cooper's early life is not known. In 1718 he and six other pirates were tried in Philadelphia for capturing the 22-ton sloop Antelope in the Delaware River. They were released for lack of evidence.

By 1725 Cooper was captain of the sloop Night Rambler. On November 14 they captured the Perry near Barbados and a French sloop the next day. Cooper took both ships to Aruba to divide the plunder, forcing their crews ashore, where the ship's doctor interceded and gave them food. The Perry’s boatswain John Upton willingly signed the pirates’ Articles (of which no record survives) and joined them. Witnesses testified that the pirates had been cruel - "attended with many very great Barbarities" - threatening to burn Perry and anyone left aboard, with one sailor "haul'd up by the Neck till his Senses were gone." Later Upton escaped and claimed he'd been forced to sign; witnesses contradicted him and he was hanged for piracy in 1729.

Shortly after capturing the Perry, Cooper was sailing alongside Francis Spriggs and Captain Shipton in the Bay of Honduras; Cooper intervened when Spriggs’ men threatened to torture a prisoner. The warships HMS Diamond and HMS Spence had been hunting Shipton and Spriggs in the area for a year. Spriggs and Shipton were caught ashore, but the Diamond engaged Cooper's ship at sea. Rather than face capture, Cooper used a cask of gunpowder to blow up the cabin of his ship.

== See also ==
- James Skyrme, Stede Bonnet, and Charles Harris - Three pirates who tried to blow up their ships to avoid capture but (unlike Cooper) failed.
