= Black Star Rising =

1986 novel by Frederik Pohl

The cover art from a 1980s edition of Black Star Rising.

Black Star Rising, published in 1986, is a dystopian science fiction novel by American author Frederik Pohl. It is about a post-nuclear war future in which a conquered United States becomes a Chinese farming colony. The main character is an American who the Chinese send to meet a race of warlike aliens who come to Earth.

== Plot ==
After a nuclear war, the countries on Earth are conquered by India and China, which each take over different countries. China turns the mostly ruined United States into a colony which is used for agriculture. An educated American working as a farm labourer, Pettyman Castor, becomes embroiled in a criminal investigation.

When he is allowed to use a computer as part of the investigation, Castor finds out that an alien space vessel (they are called "erks") is rapidly on its way to Earth. After the Chinese conquerors learn that the aliens demand to speak to the President of the United States, given that that state no longer exists, the Chinese develop a plan to use Castor as an envoy to the aliens: they appoint him as a mock President of the United States. Castor is taken by the aliens onto their spaceship, and then transported to another planet where the aliens live.

In addition, to erks, he meets patriotic American interplanetary castaways on the planet. They are the descendants of American astronauts from a previous space voyage who got stranded on the alien planet. The American castaways and the aliens develop a plan to free the United States from the Chinese colonists. However, Castor becomes concerned when he learns that the aliens are war-loving conquerors who usually leave no survivors when they invade.

== Reception ==
Dave Langford reviewed Black Star Rising for White Dwarf #81, and stated that "Good-natured stuff with a few sharp points."

== Reviews ==
- Review by Dan Chow (1985) in Locus, #293 June 1985
- Review by Baird Searles (1985) in Isaac Asimov's Science Fiction Magazine, December 1985
- Review by Tom Easton (1985) in Analog Science Fiction/Science Fact, Mid-December 1985
- Review by J. T. Moore (1986) in Fantasy Review, March 1986
- Review by John Gregory Betancourt (1986) in Amazing Stories, March 1986
- Review by Ken Lake (1986) in Vector 135
- Review by Don D'Ammassa (1987) in Science Fiction Chronicle, #92 May 1987
- Review by Robert Coulson (1987) in Amazing Stories, May 1987
