= Forward Observations Group =

Military brand lifestyle group

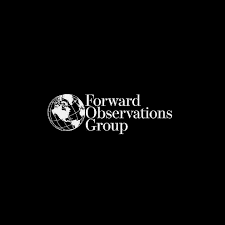
- Current owner: Derrick Bales
- Country: United States
- Markets: military lifestyle, apparel, medical equipment
- Website: http://www.forwardobservations.com

A member of Forward Observations Group walks through the ruins of a city in Donbas, Ukraine.

Forward Observations Group (FOG), is a military lifestyle brand and group founded by former U.S. Army infantryman Derrick Bales, that sells tactical gear and branded accessories and operates "popular military lifestyle social media channels" on Instagram and YouTube. The group has traveled to Ukraine, Iraq, and Syria to make connections with local fighters there and to shoot photo and video from the Russian invasion and Syrian civil war.

== Relationship to Ukraine conflict and Russian allegations ==
According to Vice News, in May 2021, pictures of Bales and other FOG members in the Donbas region of Ukraine attracted criticism and media attention for tagging members of the Azov Battalion, and raised questions about whether FOG were documentary journalists or actual combatants. In one video members of the group were shown in the back of a car driving along a highway approaching the Donetsk Airport, the site of intense fighting between Ukrainian government forces and Russia-backed separatists forces. Other posts showed Bales and other group members holding assault rifles and other weaponry.

On March 11, 2022, the Russian Ministry of Foreign Affairs issued a statement that "warned of potential chemical provocations in Ukraine" and accused U.S. "special services" and "radical Ukrainian groups" of plotting a chemical weapons attack against Ukraine as a false flag to blame Russia. The statement specifically alleged that, in December 2021, “Ukrainian radicals delivered 200-litre metal barrels with foreign markings to Donetsk Oblast. As they were being unloaded, four Ukrainian soldiers received severe chemical burns and poisoning. The general coordination of the delivery and warehousing of hazardous freight was carried out by the staff of the private American military contractor Forward Observation Group (based in the state of Nevada).” The Russian statement provided no evidence for the claims, which were denied by both Bales and the U.S. State Department, which called the allegations "preposterous," and as a “false pretext we have been warning the Kremlin would invent.”

According to Foreign Policy, "Social media channels linked to the Wagner Group have been marketing T-shirts featuring a soldier swinging a sledgehammer onto a horned skeleton’s head—the logo of the Forward Observations Group". This is a reference to the murder of Yevgeny Nuzhin, who was tortured and executed by the Wagner Group on accusations of treason.

FOG also has been active in sourcing medical supplies, gear, and money for Ukrainian fighters and foreign volunteers.

FOG has uploaded videos to its YouTube channel showing potential members using FPV drones and making payloads to be used in the conflict.

== Roll 1 Trauma Pouch ==
The Forward Observations Group "Blackbeard" logo, a variant of the Flag of Blackbeard.

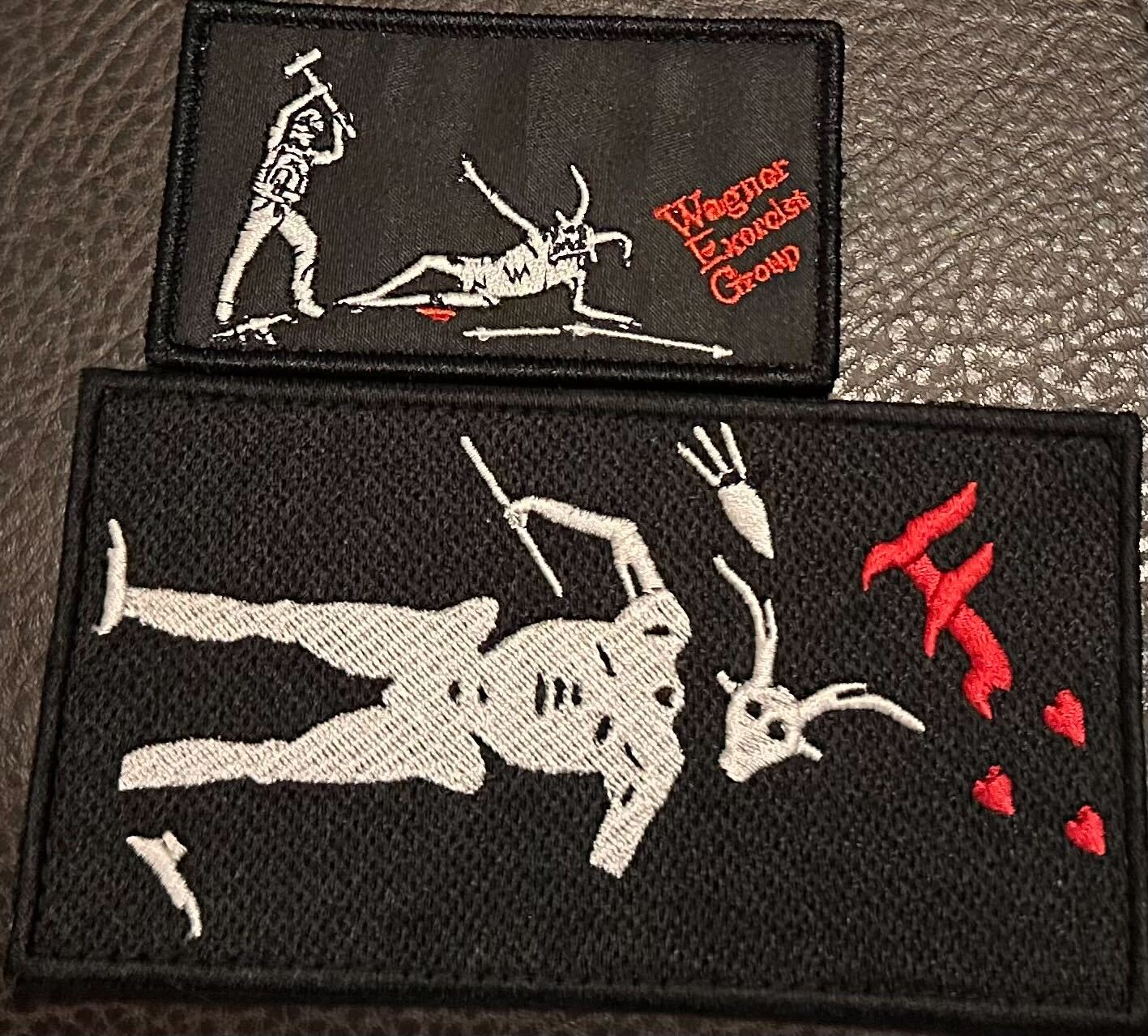
A pair of Wagner Group morale patches depicting the FOG "Blackbeard" variant logo being bludgeoned with a sledgehammer, a reference to the murder of Yevgeny Nuzhin.

FOG is credited with the invention of the oft-copied "Roll 1 Trauma Pouch" in 2017, which one of their former Special Forces Medics originally designed and fabricated for SOF operators in Syria. It is a type of IFAK intended to be worn in the opening of the rear body armor plate pocket where it is located out of the way while adding lumbar support for full-kit vehicle rides; though with hook and loop Velcro interface it can be worn on the front of a plate carrier, or on a battle belt.
