= William Coward (pirate) =

Pirate in colonial Massachusetts

William Coward (fl. 1689) was a minor pirate active off the coast of Massachusetts. He is known for a single incident involving the seizure of one small vessel, largely thanks to events surrounding his trial.

== History ==
Coward and three other men (Note: The three other men were Peleg Heath, Thomas Storey, and Christopher Knight. Some accounts mention Coward with "three men and a boy" (eg., Gosse's "Who's Who," op cit.), but trial records make no mention of the boy.) slipped their rowboat alongside the ketch Elinor in November 1689 in Boston Harbor off Nantasket. Elinor's crew and its captain, William Shortriggs, were afflicted with smallpox and offered no resistance. Coward and his men robbed Elinor and sailed it to Cape Cod but were soon caught and imprisoned.

Coward, formerly a sailor on the warship HMS Rose, was tried in January 1690. He and his men were tried alongside pirates Thomas Hawkins and Thomas Pound and their crew, who had been jailed for piracy in the same area at the same time; because of this Coward's trial and his piracy is often conflated with that of Pound and Hawkins. Coward refused to enter a plea, arguing that piracy could not be tried in common-law court, but only in Admiralty court. Further, since the presiding Vice-Admiralty judge was the now-deposed Governor Andros, (Note: When Andros tried to flee the angry Bostonian mob, he attempted unsuccessfully to reach HMS Rose, which was still the only Royal Navy ship on station.) there was no Admiralty court in the province. The court, headed by justice Samuel Sewall, convicted Coward anyway and sentenced him to hang. He was imprisoned with Pound, Hawkins, and the others, as well as "Mary Glover the Irish Catholic Witch," (Note: Mary was the daughter of Ann Glover, who had been hanged for witchcraft the previous year.) and both Sewall and Cotton Mather prayed with him. He received a reprieve and a pardon from Andros' successor Governor Bradstreet, as did the rest of his crew.

Coward's further activities are not known. Two years later Sewall would authorize the use of pressing against accused witch Giles Corey for his refusal to enter a plea and acknowledge the court's authority - a decision Sewell would later lament – though he did not do so against Coward. Pound and Hawkins also escaped the gallows, as did all but one of their crew; they sailed back to England as prisoners aboard Coward's former ship HMS Rose. A French privateer attacked Rose en route; Pound fought in the ship's defense and was granted a pardon for his piracy conviction, though Hawkins was killed during the battle.

== See also ==
- John Quelch - Another New England pirate at whose trial Sewall presided.
