= Bloody flag =

Traditional European nautical symbol

Bloody flag
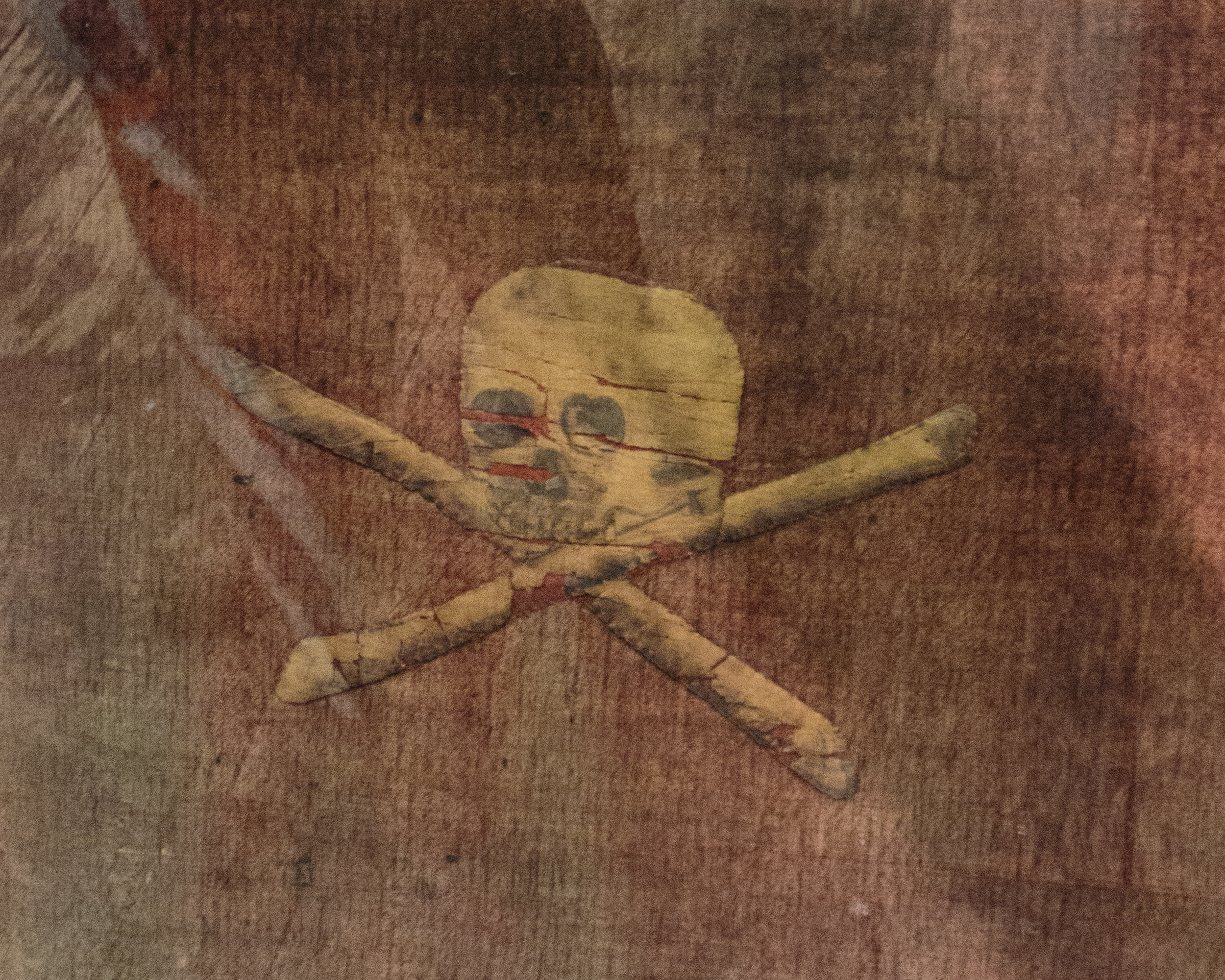
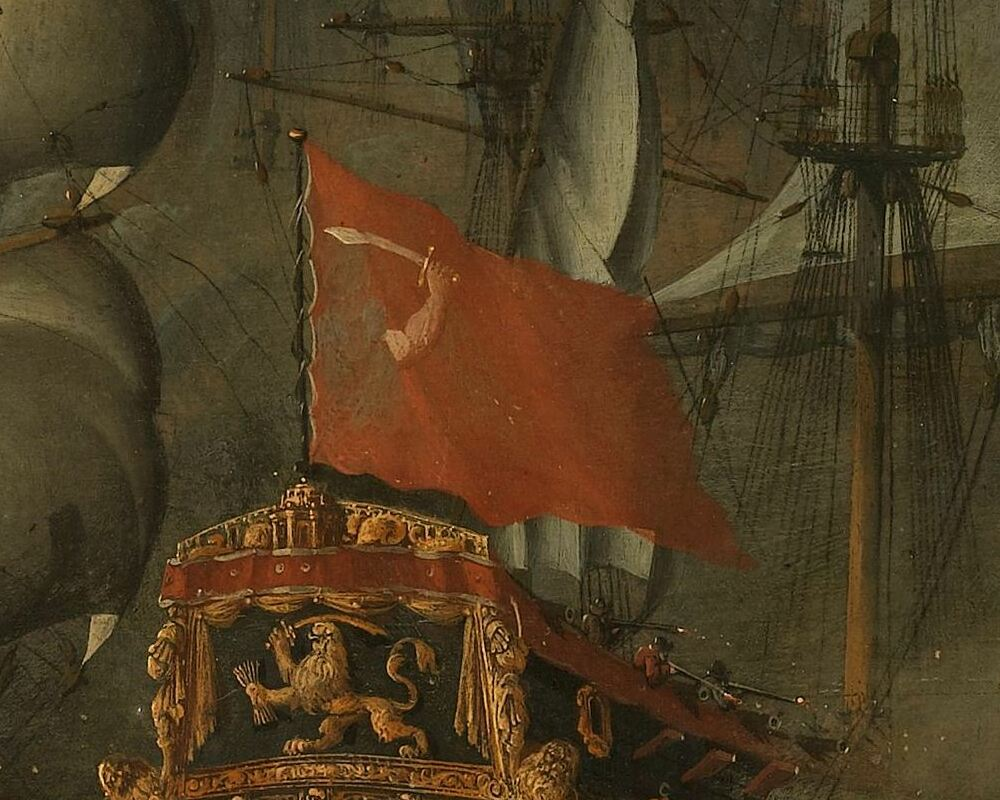
- Top left: Bloody flag without motif.
- Top right: Historical red Jolly Roger, captured by Lt. Richard Curry in the 18th century. Today residing at Portsmouth Historic Dockyard exhibition.
- Lower left: Dutch ships flying a bloody flag during the Battle of the Sound, November 8 1658, fought between the Dutch and Swedish fleets.
- Lower right: Dutch bloody flag from the mid 17th century.

Pattern-free red flags, often called bloody flags, or the bloody red (among other names, see § Names), were the traditional nautical symbol in European waters, prior to the invention of flag signal codes, to signify an intention to give battle, and that 'no quarter would be given', indicating that surrender would not be accepted and all prisoners killed, but also vice versa, meaning that the one flying the flag would fight to the last man (defiance to the death). Such flags were traditionally plain but examples with motifs also existed, such as skull and crossbones on some pirate examples (see Jolly Roger).

The origin of bloody flags is unknown, but deep red coloring is strongly associated with the color of blood and thus symbolises suffering and combat. Historical sources mention bloody flags being used by Normans as early as the 13th century, but red-painted shields were used similarly by seafaring Norse warriors in previous centuries. Since the late 18th century, the bloody flag has been transformed into the political flag for revolution (see Red flag (politics)).

== Pirate usage ==
During the Golden Age of Piracy, pirates used bloody flags in combination with the "black flag of piracy" to signal demands and threats to their victims. Initially, a false national flag would be flown as a way to close the gap between the pirate ship and the victim ship. When the victim ship came within gun range, the black flag would be raised, signaling that "quarter would be given" if the enemy surrendered, meaning they would spare the victims after rifling through their cargo. To signal "yes", the victim ship would have to take down their own flag (in naval terminology called "striking the colors"). However, if they refused, or were too slow, the pirates would raise the bloody flag, which would signal that the cargo would be taken by force and that "no quarter would be given" to prisoners. If the pirates had several ships, the raising of the bloody flag would also act as the signal "to attack" for the rest of the ships.

The pirate usage of the flag makes an appearance in the comic book The Adventures of Tintin, The Secret of the Unicorn. In a flashback about Captain Haddock's ancestor, Captain Sir Francis Haddock, it is shown how Francis' ship is attacked by the pirate captain Red Rackham and his crew. At first the pirates raise the "black Jolly Roger", but when Francis refuses to strike his flag and bombards the pirates with cannon fire, the pirates instead "hoists fresh colors" and raise the "red pennant", signaling no quarter, after which they board Francis' ship and massacre his crew.

== History ==
The first confirmed use of red flags as a signalement for no quarter stems from the Normans during the late 13th century. The origin of this use is unknown, however, the Norse ancestors of the Normans did use deep red shields as combat signalements.

Historically, deep red coloring is strongly associated with both strength and blood and thus is a common color on the battlefield dating back to ancient history. Red was the color of Roman god of war Mars, which is the reason the red planet of the same name was named for him.

=== Red Norse shields (Viking Age) ===
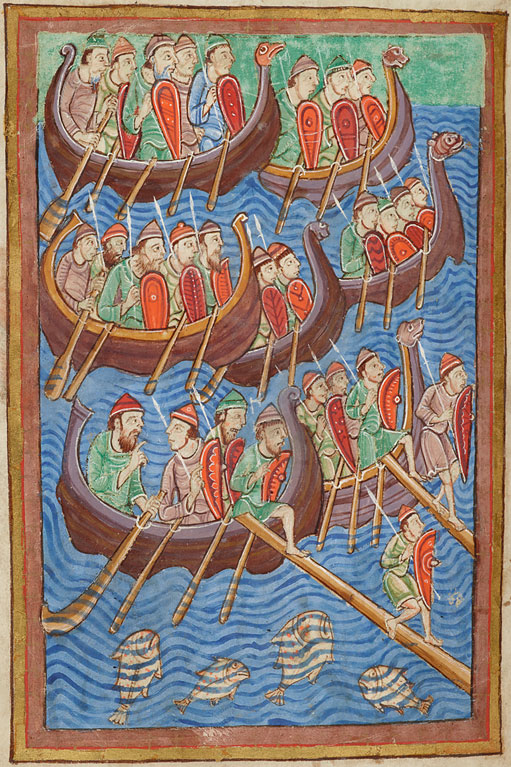
Seafaring Norsemen depicted invading England with red shields, painted c. 1130 AD

During the European Viking Age (c. 750–1200 AD), Norse seafaring warriors, today most commonly known as vikings, used painted shields as signalments when traveling by ship. Their shields were primarily single colored and featured similar color codes to modern flags. To signal neutrality or peace, white shields were used. To signal war or battle, red shields were used, etc.

Red shields appears to have had a broad symbolic use for law and order during combat. Since red shields prompted battlefields, a red shield could be hoisted to the top of the mast during naval combat to signal surrender.

=== Baucans / Bauccedillian (13th Century) ===
The first use of red flags being used to signify a "fight to the death" or "no quarter" first appears in records of the 1290s. In combat, period ships in waters in Northern Europe flew a long plain red streamer from a ship's masthead, called the Baucans or Bauccedillian. In one petition, a group of English sailors asserted that the Crown had no right to a share of the prize money earned from a Norman ship captured in 1293 because it had raised the Baucans. (Raising the streamer may have been a relatively novel practice at the time since the writers feel the need to explain it.)

Baucans is considered to have been a direct ancestor of the later bloody flag. The size according to record was 30 yards (24.45 m) long by 2 yards (1.82 m) wide.

=== Bloody flag / Flag of Defiance (17th Century) ===
By the mid-17th century, the Baucans, now known as the Bloody flag or Flag of Defiance, etc, had evolved into a conventional maritime flag and was in widespread use. It was raised in cities and castles under siege to indicate that they would not surrender. "The red flag is a signal of defiance and battle," according to Chambers Cyclopedia (1727–41).

In 1647, the bloody flag was included in Royal Navy instructions: ”[a]s soon as the Admiral shall hoist a Red Flag on the flagg staff at the fore- top - mast - head, and fire again, every Ship in the fleet is to use their utmost Endeavour to engage the enemy in Order the Admiral has prescribed to them”. This was in use until 1799 when it was dropped. During the late 17th century, English privateers had to fly red flags to distinguish their ships from the White Ensign flown by Royal Navy warships. Many of these privateers later turned to piracy and continued to use the red flag. By the American Revolutionary War, the bloody flag was only used by pirates.

== Names ==
The flag has many names internationally and historically, some possibly not period accurate. Examples include:

- Aanvalsvlag – Dutch for "attack flag"
- Baucans – a 13th-century term, now obsolete
- Bauccedillian – a 13th-century term, now obsolete
- Bloedvlag – Dutch for "blood flag"
- Bloody banner
- Bloody colors
- Bloody flag
- Bloody red
- Colours of Defiance
- Flag of Defiance
- Jolie rouge – French for "pretty red", an 18th-century term
- Jolly Roger – an 18th-century term
- Pavillon rouge – French for "flag of red"
- Pavillon sans quartier – French for "flag of no quarter"
- Red flag
- Red pennant
- Sansquartier – French compound name of "No + quarter"

== See also ==
- No quarter
- Jolly Roger
- Flag of Blackbeard
- Red flag (politics)
- Blutfahne
- Oriflamme
