= Murder of Yevgeny Nuzhin =

2022 murder of a Russian mercenary

Yevgeny Nuzhin
- Евгений Нужин
- Nuzhin just moments before his execution
- Born: 1967; Kazakh SSR, Soviet Union (now Kazakhstan)
- Died: November 2022 (aged 54–55); Russia
- Cause of death: Executed with a sledgehammer
- Known for: Russian mercenary killed for treason

Yevgeny Anatolyevich Nuzhin (Russian: Евгений Анатольевич Нужин; 1967 – November 2022) was a convicted Russian murderer who enlisted in the Wagner Group during the Russo-Ukrainian war.

He was a prisoner of war in Ukraine and was later summarily executed by the Wagner Group for alleged treason.

== Life ==
Nuzhin was born in 1967 in Kazakh SSR. As a young man, he was drafted for military service which he did in the troops subordinated to the Ministry of Interior. After the completion of his service, he settled in Nizhny Novgorod. In 1999, he murdered a person and wounded another for which he was sent to prison for 24 years. In jail, he married a woman named Olga Viktorovna with whom he had two sons. He was sentenced to an additional four years in prison for an attempted escape for a total of 28 years.

He spent the first four years of his sentence in hard labour camps in northern Ural. Later, he was sent to IK3 prison in Ryazan Oblast. After three years, he was sent to Vladimir after which he returned to Ryazan. While in prison, he maintained social media accounts. He expressed support for the annexation of Crimea and the invasion of Ukraine.

== Capture in Ukraine ==
Nuzhin stated that he joined the Wagner Group after Yevgeny Prigozhin visited his prison in Ryazan region. After training for seven days, on 25 August he was sent to the Luhansk region. On 2 September he arrived on the frontline of the Russo-Ukrainian war. On 4 September, he decided to surrender. Nuzhin was then captured by Ukraine. As a prisoner of war, he gave an interview to Ukrainian journalist Yuri Butusov, and said he had only joined the Wagner Group to get out of prison and quickly surrender to Ukraine. He argued that he was opposed to the Russian invasion, and expressed his hope to stay in Ukraine and that he wished to fight for the Armed Forces of Ukraine.

== Death ==
On 13 November, a Wagner Group-affiliated Telegram channel released a video titled "The hammer of revenge" showing Nuzhin's "execution for treachery" using a sledgehammer. Yevgeny Prigozhin, chief of Wagner Group, claimed responsibility for his killing saying that it was "dog's death for the dog." In this video Nuzhin said that he was kidnapped on 11 November 2022, while walking in the streets of Kyiv, Ukraine, although it is possible the Wagner Group forced him to say this to warn others.

According to the human rights group Gulagu.net, he was either recaptured or passed back to the Russian Army which handed him over to Wagner Security Service. According to the Telegram channel "Cheka-OGPU", Nuzhin was returned on 11 November in a 45 to 45 prisoner exchange.

On 13 November, Gulagu.net called on Ukrainian President Volodymyr Zelenskyy to investigate how Nuzhin ended up in Wagner Group captivity despite having surrendered to Ukraine. Nuzhin's relatives in Russia blamed Ukraine for allowing him to be killed, although his sons also stated that Russia's Federal Security Service was "looking for them" to ensure their silence on the matter. On 15 November Mykhailo Podoliak, Ukrainian presidential advisor, said that Nuzhin had agreed to participate in a prisoner exchange.

A source in the Ukrainian army told BBC that Nuzhin was returned to Russia in exchange for twenty Ukrainian servicemen freed from Russian captivity. The source, as well as journalist Ramina Eshakzai, who interviewed Nuzhin, both opined that as soon as they could get Ukrainian soldiers in exchange, they did not care what happened to Nuzhin.

In Russia, neither the General Attorney office nor the Investigation Committee opened an investigation. Dmitry Peskov, the spokesman of Vladimir Putin, when asked about the incident, answered "This is not our business". The family learned of the murder from social media.

== Legacy ==
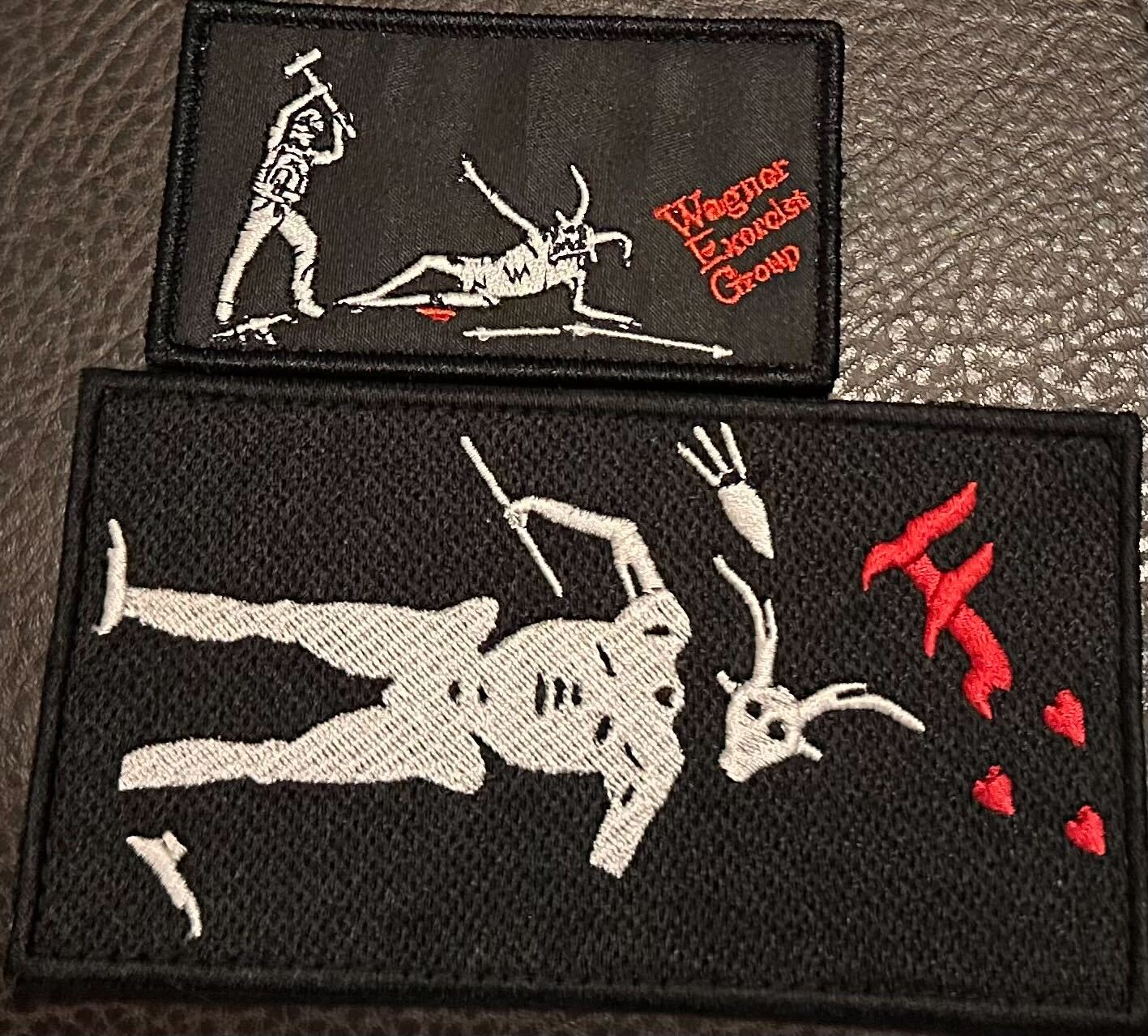
Wagner Group propaganda patches depicting a sledgehammer assault on the logo of the Forward Observations Group

After the murder of Yevgeny Nuzhin and after a Wagner Group videotaped murder of a Syrian Army deserter in 2017 showing the deserter being beaten to death with a sledgehammer before his body was beheaded and set on fire, Wagner Group made sledgehammers a part of its brand. Consequently, T-shirts and other merchandise depict sledgehammers alongside the Wagner logo and supporters and members of the group pictured themselves holding both real sledgehammers and replicas, in photographs shared online.

In November 2022, when the European Parliament adopted a resolution designating Russia as a state sponsor of terrorism, Yevgeny Prigozhin sent a sledgehammer smeared with fake blood to the European Parliament. A group of Russian ultranationalists threw sledgehammers at the Finnish Embassy in Moscow and Sergei Mironov, a Russian parliamentarian, posted a photo of himself posing with a sledgehammer branded with Wagner’s logo atop an engraving of a pile of skulls.
