= Capture of the sloop Ranger =

1723 naval battle off Block Island

- Part of the Golden Age of Piracy
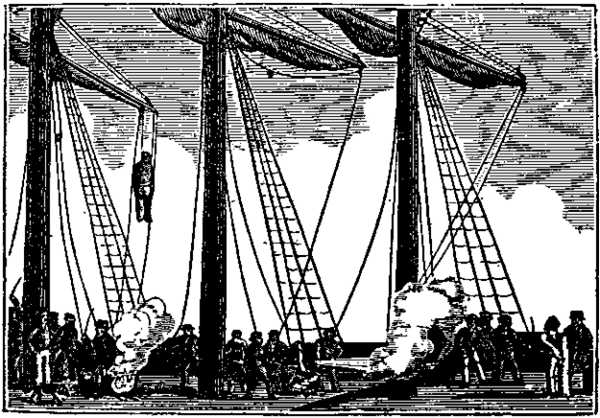
- A drawing of Edward Low's ship
Date	June 10, 1723
Location	Off Block Island, Atlantic Ocean
Result	British victory

Belligerents
Great Britain	Pirates

Commanders and leaders
Peter Solgard	Edward Low; Charles Harris (surrendered)

Strength
1 post ship	1 schooner 1 sloop

Casualties and losses
None	43 captured 1 sloop captured

The capture of the sloop Ranger occurred on June 10, 1723 near Block Island in the Atlantic Ocean. Two pirate ships under the command of Englishmen Edward Low and Charles Harris attacked HMS Greyhound a post ship of the Royal Navy which they mistook for a civilian whaler. The resulting engagement lasted for several hours and ended with Harris' sloop Ranger being captured by Greyhound while Low's schooner Fancy escaped. All surviving crew of Ranger were captured and brought to Newport, Rhode Island, where they were placed on trial, sentenced to death and executed.

== Background ==
Edward Low was an eighteenth-century English pirate known for his extreme cruelty. He personally killed over fifty men and committed several atrocities such as forcing prisoners he captured to eat human flesh. By the summer of 1723, Low commanded the eighty-ton schooner named Fancy and was the most feared pirate in the Atlantic Ocean. Fancy was armed with ten guns and had a crew of forty-four, many of whom were conscripted. Accompanying Fancy was the sloop Ranger under fellow Englishman Charles Harris. Ranger was a former French sloop that was captured by Low near Grenada in 1723. Her armament and number of crew is not known. Some accounts cite Low as having commanded the sloop Fortune during this period instead of Fancy. In response to Low's activities, the British Royal Navy dispatched several warships on anti-piracy patrols. One of the Royal Navy warships carrying out such patrols was HMS Greyhound under Captain Peter Solgard. The sixth rate mounted a twenty-gun armament and a complement of about 120 officers and crewmen.

== Capture ==
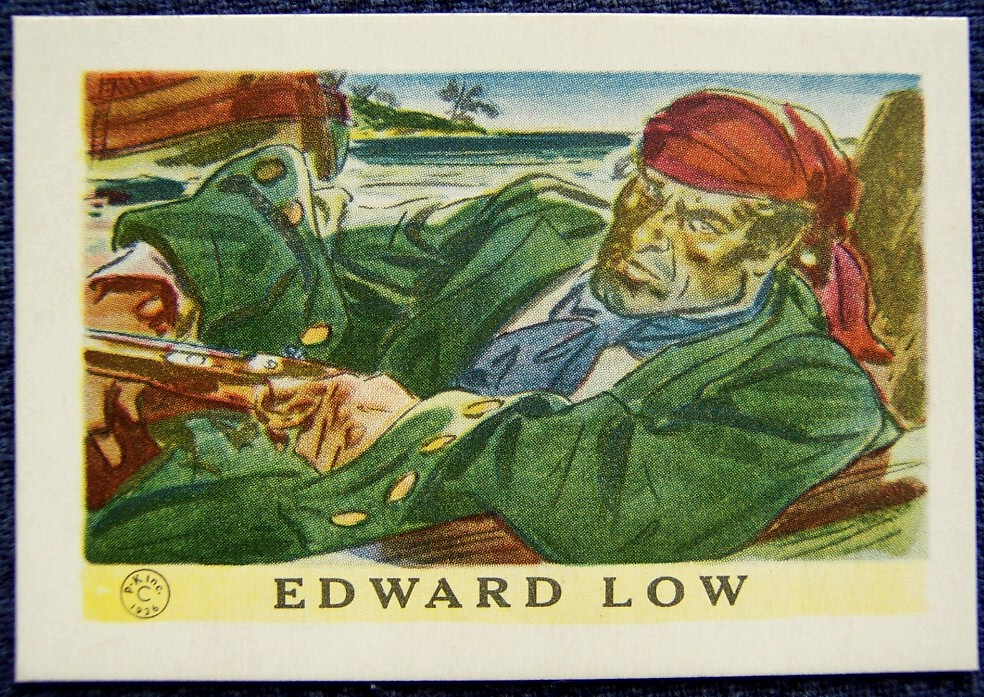
A 1936 postcard depicting Edward Low

Low was headed due northwest from the Azores to attack merchant shipping off the British North American coastline. Meanwhile, Greyhound embarked on a search for Low. While cruising off the Delaware Bay's mouth, Low and his crew sighted the post ship and gave chase. Low hoisted his Jolly Roger, believing that his prey was a British civilian whaler, but when the pirates drew near, Greyhound revealed herself with by raising of colors and fired a broadside into the Fancy as the pirates were preparing to board.

Low's schooner sustained damage and began returning fire while Ranger maneuvered into firing position. The sloop opened fire briefly with her guns but after only a few minutes both the pirate ships chose to flee. A running battle then continued for several hours. Fancy was dismasted by well-placed cannon fire but escaped, while Ranger was unable to do so. Prevented from fleeing due to unfavorable wind conditions, the crew of Ranger used oars to help steer their ship away from post ship. The use of oars proved to be pointless when the faster Greyhound came alongside Ranger and the crews of two ships began skirmishing with small arms. Grappling hooks were thrown and the crew of Greyhound boarded the sloop. After a few more moments of intense close-quarters combat the pirates surrendered and were taken prisoner. Fancy was said to have carried around £150,000 worth of gold during the engagement.

== Aftermath ==
Thirty-seven White men and six Black men onboard Ranger were captured. Twenty-five of these, including the young Harris, were subsequently transported to Newport, Rhode Island, where they were put on trial, sentenced to death and executed on June 19, 1723. Solgard became famous in both North America and England, receiving prize money for the sloop he captured, which was found to be transporting a cargo of gold. He eventually rose to the rank of admiral before retiring. Low continued his life of piracy and captured several more ships, including a 22-gun French Navy warship. Depictions of his later career give the impressions that he grew more cruel after his defeat, particularly to his British captives. Circumstances of his death are unknown, though he died sometime in 1724.

== Bibliography ==
- Crooker, William S. (2004). Bartholomew; Kidd, William; Easton, Peter. "Pirates of the North Atlantic". Halifax: Nimbus Publishing. ISBN 1-55109-513-0.
- Duhamel, Gregory (2023). "Capture of the Sloop Ranger". ISBN 978-1-716-75330-5.
