= Thomas Pound =

English pirate

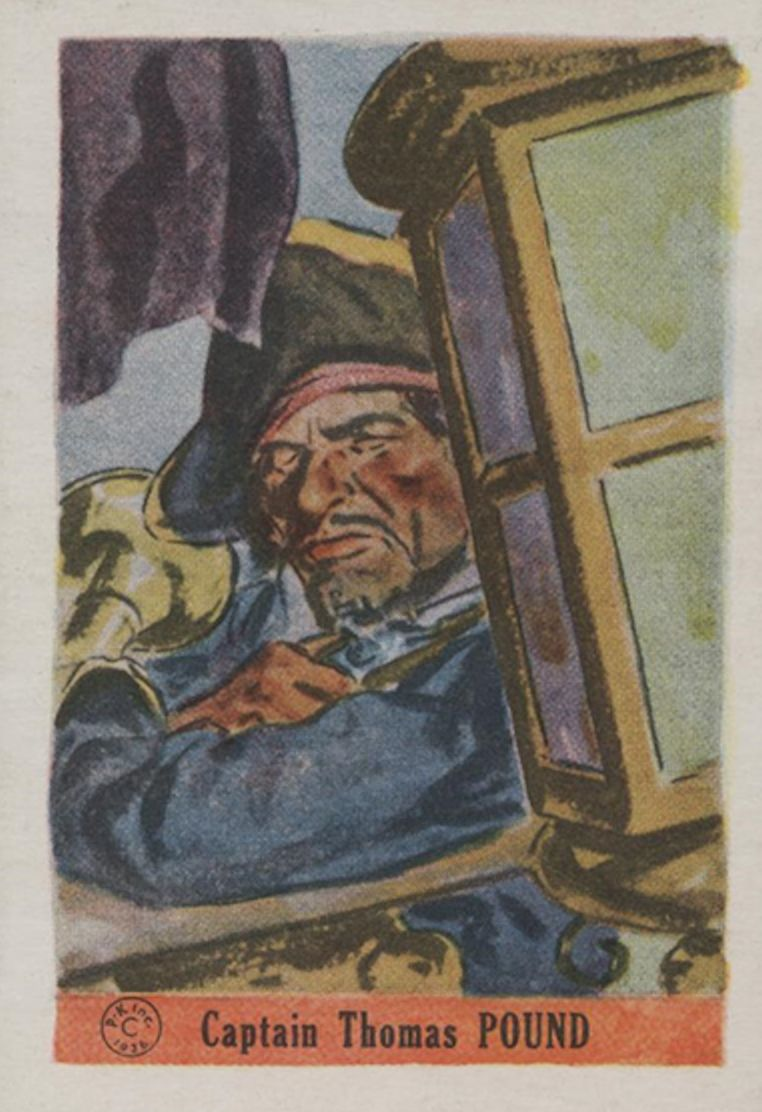
- Born: (presumed) England
- Died: 1703
- Piratical career
- Years active: 1689–1690
- Rank: Captain
- Base of operations: Coast of New England

Thomas Pound (also spelled Thomas Pounds and Thomas Ponnd; died 1703) was an English Royal Navy officer who turned pirate and was briefly active in the coastal waters of New England during 1689. Caught and convicted of piracy, his crimes were forgiven and he later rejoined the Royal Navy.

== Early life ==
Born in England, Pound joined the Royal Navy and rose to become a junior officer and naval cartographer stationed in the colonial port of Boston, Massachusetts. One of Pound's maps has been preserved in the Library of Congress, depicting the New England coastline between Cape Cod and "Cape Sables" on modern-day Sable Island.

== Pirate ==
On August 8, 1689, Pound was aboard a small vessel owned by Thomas Hawkins, in the company with six other passengers when it anchored off Lovell's Island and was boarded by five additional men. By pre-arrangement, Pound and the newly arrived men from Lovell's Island then seized the ship as their own. Hawkins willingly joined the pirates; he was occasionally named in Pound's place in subsequent events.

Pound's first encounter as a pirate was unspectacular. Sailing along the Massachusetts Coast, he encountered a fishing vessel but failed to engage. Instead, Pound had his vessel hauled alongside and purchased a supply of mackerel for eight pennies. Turning north, Pound made port in Falmouth, Maine and supplemented his small crew with soldiers who had deserted from the local garrison. Returning to sea, Pound and his men then attacked the sloop Good Speed off Cape Cod and the brigantine Merrimack among other ships in the New England area.

An armed sloop, Mary, was soon sent out by the Massachusetts governor against Pound and his crew. On 4 October, Mary discovered and engaged Pound's vessel anchored off Naushon Island. In heavy fighting Pound suffered gunshot wounds and Mary's captain, Samuel Pease, was killed. Outnumbered and outgunned, Pound and his crew surrendered and were taken back to Boston for trial. On January 13, 1690, Pound and Hawkins were found guilty of acts of piracy and sentenced to death.

== Redemption ==
Pound was placed aboard HMS Rose, the replacement by the Royal Navy of Pound's old frigate the Salé Rose bound for England, where his sentence would be carried out. However, the ship was mid-voyage when it was attacked by a French privateer. Pound was released to assist with the defence after the death of the captain, and fought bravely on behalf of his captors, Pound received a commutation of sentence on arrival in England and was released from prison after a short incarceration. Hawkins had been sent back to England on the same ship but was killed in the action against the French privateer.

Pound's naval rank was restored and he was later given command of his own vessel, his brief piratical career apparently forgotten. He died in 1703.

== See also ==
- Woods Hole Museum, "Pursuit and Capture of a Privateer off Woods Hole, 1689" - Two paintings by Franklin Gifford depicting Pound's capture by the Mary.
- William Coward - seized a ketch in the same area at the same time as Hawkins and Pound, and was jailed and tried alongside them.

== Bibliography ==
- Peterson, Mark A. (2002). "The Selling of Joseph: Bostonians, Antislavery and the Protestant International, 1689-1733". Massachusetts Historical Review. 4. Massachusetts Historical Society: iv–22. JSTOR 25081169.
- Ellis, George E.; Winsor, Justin; Porter, Edward G.; Deane, Charles; Peabody, Andrew P. (May 1886). "May Meeting, 1886. Diaries of Sullivan's Expedition: General Sullivan's Expedition: Journal of William McKendry: Maps of Boston Harbor: The Boston Port Bill: Dr Belknap's Protest: Memoir of John Langdon Sibley". Proceedings of the Massachusetts Historical Society. 2. Massachusetts Historical Society: 435–507. JSTOR 25079647.
