= Old Roger (Jolly Roger) =

Historical pirate flag

Interpretation of the "Old Roger" design.

The Old Roger flag is a loose term for a historical variant of the pirate ensign Jolly Roger, whose motif consists of a skeleton on a black field, holding an hourglass in one hand and a dart striking a heart in the other. The general design is noted to have been used by a number of Golden Age pirates, but the association with the name Old Roger is modern.

The name "Old Roger" is an old humorous or familiar name for the devil, or death.

== Accounts ==
The design is described in several period accounts for several pirates, such as famous Golden Age pirates Edward Low, Charles Harris and Francis Spriggs.

The name "Old Roger" in association with the design is found in a news report in the Weekly Journal or British Gazetteer (London, Saturday, 19 October 1723; Issue LVII, p. 2, col. 1):

“Parts of the West-Indies. Rhode-Island, July 26. This Day, 26 of the Pirates taken by his Majesty Ship the Greyhound, Captain Solgard, were executed here. Some of them delivered what they had to say in writing, and most of them said something at the Place of Execution, advising all People, young ones especially, to take warning by their unhappy Fate, and to avoid the crimes that brought them to it. Their black flag, under which they had committed abundance of Pyracies and Murders, was affix'd to one Corner of the Gallows. It had in it the Portraiture of Death, with an Hour-Glass in one Hand, and a Dart in the other, striking into a Heart, and three Drops of Blood delineated as falling from it. This Flag they called Old Roger, and us'd to say, They would live and die under it.”

Edward Low's initial flag was described as a “Black Ensign [with] a white Skeleton in the middle of it, with a Dart in One Hand striking a bleeding Heart, and in the other an Hourglass”.

Francis Spriggs' flag was described in The Political state of Great Britain (Volume XXVIII, August 1724):

“..their black Ensign, in the Middle of which is a large white Skeleton, with a Dart in one Hand, and in the other an Hour Glass.”

A Richard Hawkins, who was captured by pirates in 1724, reported that the pirates had a black flag bearing the figure of a skeleton stabbing a heart with a spear, which they named "Jolly Roger".

== Historical variants ==
=== Charles Harris variant ===
According to one source, pirate Charles Harris used a blue version of the Old Roger flag:

"...under their own deep Blew Flagg which was hoisted up on their Gallows, and had pourtraied on the middle of it, an Anatomy with an Hour-Glass in one hand, and a dart in the Heart with 3 drops of blood proceeding from it, in the other."

Interpretation of Charles Harris' flag

=== William Moody variant ===
One of William Moody's pirate flags is described as:

“A black Flag, having a white Man painted in it, with three Arrows, whose Points were turn’d toward a red Heart, and underneath it were some red Spots, resembling Blood”.

Interpretation of William Moody's flag

== Fictional variants ==
=== Blackbeard variant ===
In the 20th century, the famous pirate Blackbeard, was attributed a variant of this flag with the addition of devil-horns.

Blackbeard's modern fictional Old Roger flag with devil horns

=== John Quelch variant ===
Popular myth has it that John Quelch flew a pirate flag referred to as Old Roger by his crew. It is sometimes considered to be the origin of the name Jolly Roger. It is alleged that his theme was later borrowed by Blackbeard and Bartholomew Roberts. There is no evidence whatsoever that Quelch flew any flag other than the Flag of St. George or possibly a privateer's flag of St. George quartered on a red background similar to today's British merchant colors. Courtroom testimony from the crew maintained that the flag of England had been flown at all times. The origin of this myth of Quelch's flag being described as having "in the middle of it an Anatomy with an Hourglass in one hand and a dart in the Heart with three drops of Blood proceeding from it in the other." most likely stems from the poetic license of Ralph D. Paine, a popular writer at the turn of the 20th century. None of the principals involved in the affair, not even the Governor or the prosecution, ever mentioned such colors being employed by Quelch.

John Quelch's modern fictional Old Roger flag

=== Bartholomew Robert variant ===
One of Bartholomew Roberts' flags is described in Captain Charles Johnson's A General History of the Pyrates as "The Flag had a Death in it, with an Hour-Glass in one Hand, and cross Bones in the other, a Dart by it, and underneath a Heart dropping three Drops of Blood." But there is no historical testimony that Roberts flew this flag.

Bartholomew Roberts' modern fictional Old Roger flag
