= Thomas Hawkins (pirate) =

New England pirate (died 1690)

Thomas Hawkins (died 1690) was a pirate briefly active off the coast of New England. He was known for sailing with Thomas Pound.

== History ==
Thomas Pound collected a group of sailors in August 1689 and hired Thomas Hawkins to transport them to Nantasket. En route Pound asked Hawkins to divert his fishing vessel to pick up a few more sailors. Once aboard they brandished arms and Pound announced that he intended to take up piracy, ostensibly to sail against the French in the West Indies. Hawkins willingly joined them.

They soon captured the ketch Mary, transferring to it and releasing their prisoners aboard Hawkins’ smaller ship. A ship crewed by militia members from Salem and Marblehead searched for Hawkins and Pound but missed them. Near Casco Bay, Maine they took aboard soldiers from nearby Fort Loyal, who deserted to join the pirates. They stole arms and a cannon when they slipped out in the night. Off Cape Cod they captured the sloop Good Speed, again transferring to the larger ship and releasing their prisoners.

Again a militia sloop was sent to search for them, again without success. Hawkins and Pound looted the brigantine Merrimack near Martha’s Vineyard before a storm forced the Good Speed as far south as Virginia. Sailing back to Tarpaulin Cove, Hawkins went ashore and fled the pirates. In a letter he wrote, “by God thay kant hang me for what has bin don for no blood has bin shed.” He tried to secure passage back to Boston aboard a whaling ship but was recognized; the ship’s captain, James Loper, agreed to take Hawkins but instead turned him in to the authorities immediately after arriving in Boston.

Pound meanwhile looted several more ships before he was attacked by Captain Samuel Pease aboard the Mary (the same ketch Pound and Hawkins had captured and released) in early October 1689. Pease’s men exchanged small arms fire with Pound and his pirates for a time until Pound was hit and badly wounded and most of his crew were injured or killed. Pease himself was hit and later died, the only casualty of Pound and Hawkins’ piracy.

Hawkins and Pound were tried together in January 1690; both were found guilty and sentenced to hang. Fellow pirate William Coward was tried at the same time, though his crimes were unrelated. The presiding judge was Samuel Sewall, later famed for presiding over the Salem witch trials; in jail Hawkins was imprisoned alongside “Mary Glover the Irish Catholic witch,” and Cotton Mather prayed with the condemned. Hawkins had influential friends and relatives who arranged a reprieve for him, and there was evidence that Pound may have forced Hawkins to remain with them. They were both sent back to England aboard the frigate HMS Rose. On the way they were attacked by a French privateer. Hawkins and Pound fought bravely to defend the Rose against the French. Hawkins was killed during the battle, while Pound survived and was pardoned for his piracies, eventually rising to command a Royal Navy ship of his own.

== See also ==
- Josiah Burgess, another pardoned pirate who never returned to piracy and instead led a respectable life.
