= Francis Spriggs =

British pirate

Francis Farrington Spriggs
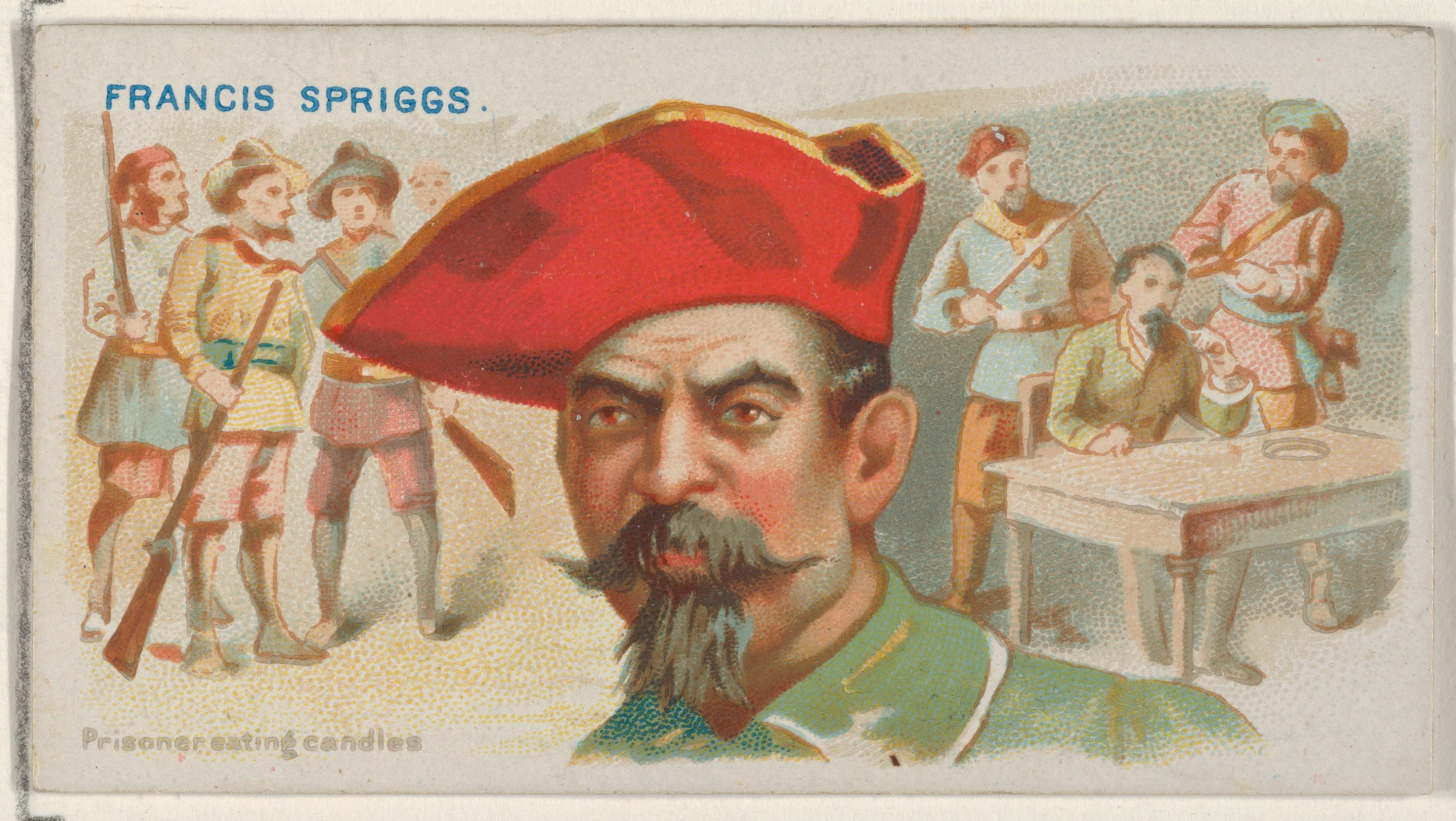

Francis Spriggs (died 1725?) was a British pirate who, associated with George Lowther and Edward Low, was active in the Caribbean and the Bay of Honduras during the early 1720s.

== Early career ==
Although much of his early life is unknown, Francis Spriggs was first recorded serving as a quartermaster for Captain Edward Low (possibly as part of the original crew members who left the service of Captain George Lowther). However, after being given command of the recently captured the 12-gun British man of war Squirel (renamed Delight shortly thereafter), he and Low apparently had a falling out over the disciplining of one of the crew around Christmas 1724, resulting in Spriggs and Lowther deserting Low in the night.

Fisherman Philip Ashton had been forced into service by Low and his new quartermaster John Russell in June 1723 but escaped the following year when Low's flotilla stopped near Roatan. In 1724 he and a few other castaways spotted an incoming vessel and hoped for rescue. When they realized the sailors were Spriggs' pirates (and afraid Spriggs might recognize him), Ashton hid, preferring to take his chances on Roatan rather than return to piracy.

== Spriggs & Delight ==
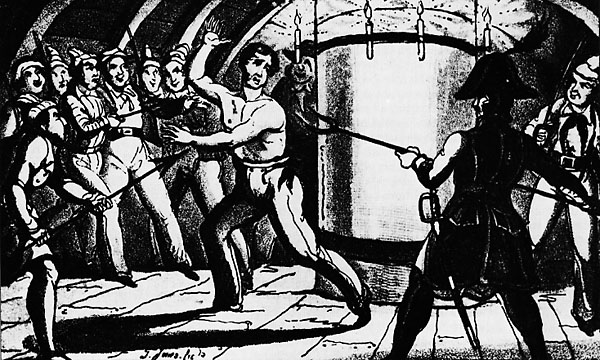
A later 19th-century illustration of a captive Portuguese sailor forced to run through "the sweats" by Spriggs and his crew

Flag of Francis Spriggs, Charles Harris, Edward Low and others.

After leaving Low, Spriggs and the crew began flying a black flag similar to Captain Low's and set sail for the West Indies. By January 28, 1725, he had looted a Rhode Island slaver captained by Richard Duffie. Capturing a Portuguese bark en route, they looted the ship's stores while the crew were put through "the sweats" or a "sweat", a form of torture in which a ring of candles was lit in a circle around the mainmast and each crewman was made to enter the circle and run around the mast while the pirates poked and jabbed at them with pen knives, forks and other weapons in a sort of gauntlet. After they had finished, the crew were put back on their ship and the pirates set fire to it.

Upon their arrival in the West Indies, Spriggs and his crew captured a sloop near St. Lucia, a Martinique merchantman, and a vessel with a cargo of logwood, which they tossed into the sea after carrying away as much as they could take. In early 1724, while in New England waters, Spriggs and Delight received word of the death of King George I and discussed the possibility of gaining a royal pardon within the year after sailing from Rhode Island on March 27, 1724.

== In the Bay of Honduras ==
By early-April, Spriggs anchored off Roatan near the Bay of Honduras, where he ordered many of the prisoners captured during the voyages to be put ashore. Many of these prisoners displayed wounds inflicted by the pirates during their captivity and were subject to forms of torture such as being forced to eat plates of candle wax.

Refitting their ship on a nearby island west of Roatan, Spriggs and Delight sailed for Saint Kitts with the intentions of encountering a Captain Moor of Eagle, a sloop that had earlier attacked George Lowther near Blanco.

However, they were soon met by a French man of war and forced to flee. After their escape, they captured a schooner near Bermuda and then, as they neared Saint Kitts, they captured a sloop on July 4, 1724. During this latest capture, the crew were tortured by Spriggs and his crew by hoisting the prisoners as high as the main or top sails and dropping them against the deck.

Shortly after this, a ship out of Rhode Island was captured; the pirates were riding several of the horses it had been carrying on the deck (after several accidents, however, the captives were blamed for not bringing along boots and spurs).

== Return to the Bay of Honduras ==
Here Spriggs rejoined forces with Captain Shipton, who had been given command of Low's ship Merry Christmas after Low's crew mutinied. After the capture of a sloop off Port Royal, Spriggs was forced to retreat from two British warships, HMS Diamond and HMS Spence. After their most recent escape, Spriggs captured another sloop and, on his return to the Bay of Honduras, took yet another ten or twelve English vessels before being chased off by a British man of war.

Briefly staying in South Carolina, Spriggs again sailed to the Bay of Honduras where he captured sixteen more vessels before fleeing from the same British warship he had previously encountered. He again managed to avoid capture, although his fleet broke up when he became separated from Shipton. It may have been around this time that Spriggs' quartermaster Philip Lyne took the prize ship Sea Nymph and left Spriggs to sail for Newfoundland. Little is known of his later career; according to newspaper accounts, he was still active in the region and, as of April 1725, had captured several more ships.

One newspaper account does suggest Spriggs was still active as late as 1726 when he was marooned on an island with Shipton and another famous pirate, Edward Low. The report comes from the Post-Boy dated June 25, 1726. The only known original of the Post-Boy newspaper still in existence is owned by Eric Bjotvedt and states, in a front-page report, that a sloop from the Bay of Honduras was taken by a Spanish vessel, but that later the Spaniards were captured and "...put on board the " Diamond Man of War, who had taken a Pyrate, commanded by one Cooper, and had a great many Prisoners on board, and was bound to Jamaica with them ... [and] that Lowe and Spriggs were both maroon'd, and were got among the Musketoo Indians." According to another source, Spriggs and Shipton were still being pursued by HMS Diamond and Spence; Spriggs' men were captured alongside a sleeping Shipton, while both Spriggs and Low himself escaped again, and Cooper blew up his ship with gunpowder rather than be captured.

== See also ==
- List of pirates
- George Lowther
- Captain Shipton
