= No quarter =

Policy to kill, not capture, defeated troops

An order to give no quarter, during military conflict or piracy, directs that captured enemy combatants should be executed rather than taken prisoner. Since the Hague Convention of 1899, it is considered a war crime; it is also prohibited in customary international law and by the Rome Statute. Article 23 of the Hague Convention of 1907 states that "it is especially forbidden [...] to declare that no quarter will be given".

== Etymology ==
The term no quarter may originate from an order by the commander of a victorious army that they will not quarter (house) captured enemy combatants. Therefore, none can be taken prisoner and all enemy combatants must be killed.

A second derivation, given equal prominence in the Oxford English Dictionary (OED), is that quarter (n.17) can mean "Relations with, or conduct towards, another" as in Shakespeare's Othello, Act II, scene iii, line 180, "Friends all [...] In quarter, and in termes, like bride and groome". So "no quarter" may also mean refusal to enter into an agreement (relations) with an enemy attempting to surrender.

The OED mentions a third possible derivation but says "The assertion of De Brieux (Origines [...] de plusieurs façons de parler (1672) 16) that it arose in an agreement between the Dutch and Spanish, by which the ransom of an officer or private was to be a quarter of his pay, is at variance with the sense of the phrases to give or receive quarter."

== History ==
During the First English Civil War, the Long Parliament issued an ordinance of no quarter to the Irish on 24 October 1644 in response to Confederate Ireland electing to send troops in support of Charles I of England against them:

An Ordinance Commanding that no Officer or Soldier either by Sea or Land, shall give any Quarter to any Irishman, or to any papist born in Ireland, which shall be taken in Arms against the Parliament in England.

By the 17th century, siege warfare was an exact art, the rules of which were so well understood that wagering on the outcome and duration of a siege became a popular craze; the then-enormous sum of £200,000 was alleged to have been bet on the outcome of the Second Siege of Limerick in 1691. Professional honour demanded a defence, but if a garrison surrendered when "a practicable breach" had been made, they were given "quarter". The garrison signaled their intent to surrender by "beating the chamade"; if accepted, they were generally allowed to retain their weapons, and received a safe conduct to the nearest friendly territory. If a garrison continued their defence beyond this point, the surrender was not accepted, hence "no quarter"; the besiegers were then "permitted" to sack the town, and the garrison was often killed.

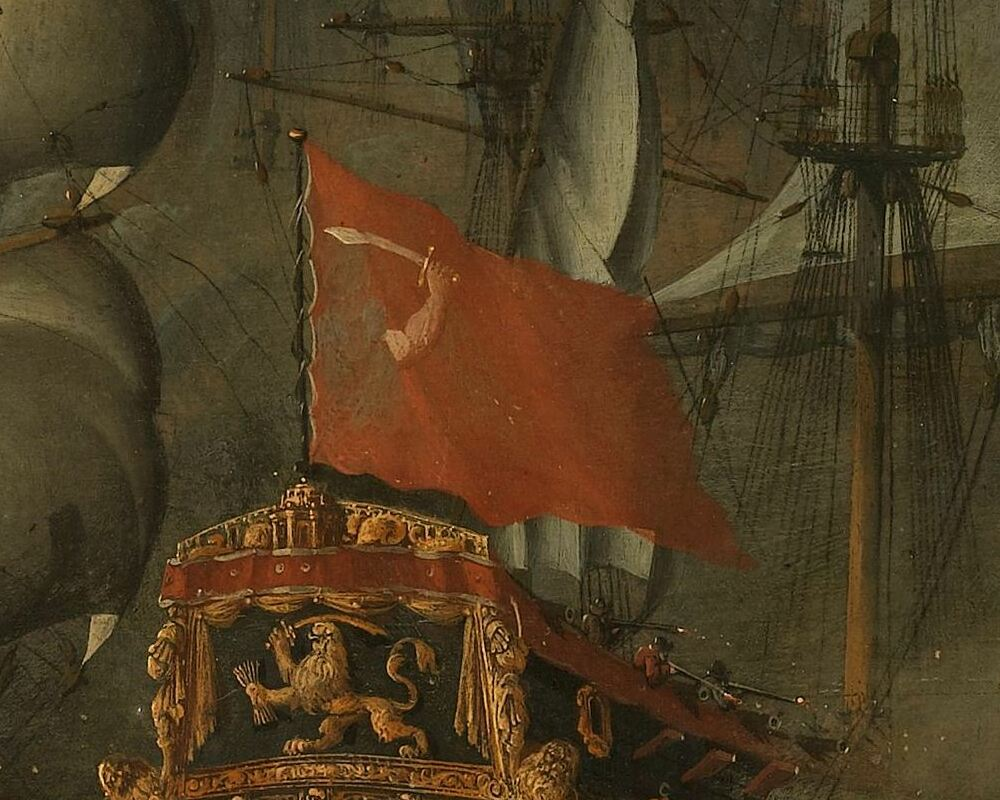
Dutch ship flying a bloody flag during the Battle of the Sound in 1658

The traditional "Jolly Roger" flag of piracy, signalling that quarter would be given to those who surrendered

In some circumstances, the opposing forces would signal their intention to give no quarter by using a red flag (the so-called bloody flag). However, the use of a red flag to signal no quarter does not appear to have been universal among combatants. Black flags have been used to signify that quarter would be given if surrender was prompt; the best-known example is the Jolly Roger used by pirates to intimidate a target crew into surrender. By promising quarter, pirates avoided costly and dangerous sea battles which might leave both ships crippled and dozens of critical crew dead or incapacitated.

Other "no quarter" incidents took place during the Battle of the Alamo in 1836, the 1850 to 1864 Taiping Rebellion, and at the Battle of Tippermuir in 1644 when Scottish Covenanters used the battle cry "Jesus, and no quarter".

In March 2026, United States Secretary of Defense Pete Hegseth pledged "no quarter, no mercy for our enemies" in reference to Iran during the Iran war.

== International humanitarian law ==
Under international humanitarian law, "it is especially forbidden [...] to declare that no quarter will be given". This was established under Article 23(d) of the 1907 Hague Convention IV – The Laws and Customs of War on Land. Since a judgment on the law relating to war crimes and crimes against humanity at the Nuremberg trials in October 1946, the provisions of the 1907 Hague Convention—including Article 23(d)'s explicit prohibition to declare that no quarter will be given—are considered to be part of the customary laws of war and are binding upon all parties in an international armed conflict.

== See also ==
- El Degüello
- List of established military terms
- Oriflamme
- Safe conduct – A contrasting policy; a guarantee of unharassed passage through enemy territory.

== Sources ==
- Afflerbach, Holger; Strachan, Hew, eds. (2012). How Fighting Ends: A History of Surrender. OUP. ISBN 978-0199693627.
- Manning, Roger (2006). An Apprenticeship in Arms: The Origins of the British Army 1585–1702. OUP. ISBN 0199261490.
- Nofi, Albert A. (1992). The Alamo and the Texas War of Independence, September 30, 1835 to April 21, 1836: Heroes, Myths, and History. Combined Books, Inc. ISBN 0-938289-10-1.
- Williams, RH (2001). Montrose: Cavalier in Mourning. House of Lochar. ISBN 978-1899863594.
