= Edward Low =

English pirate (1690–1724)

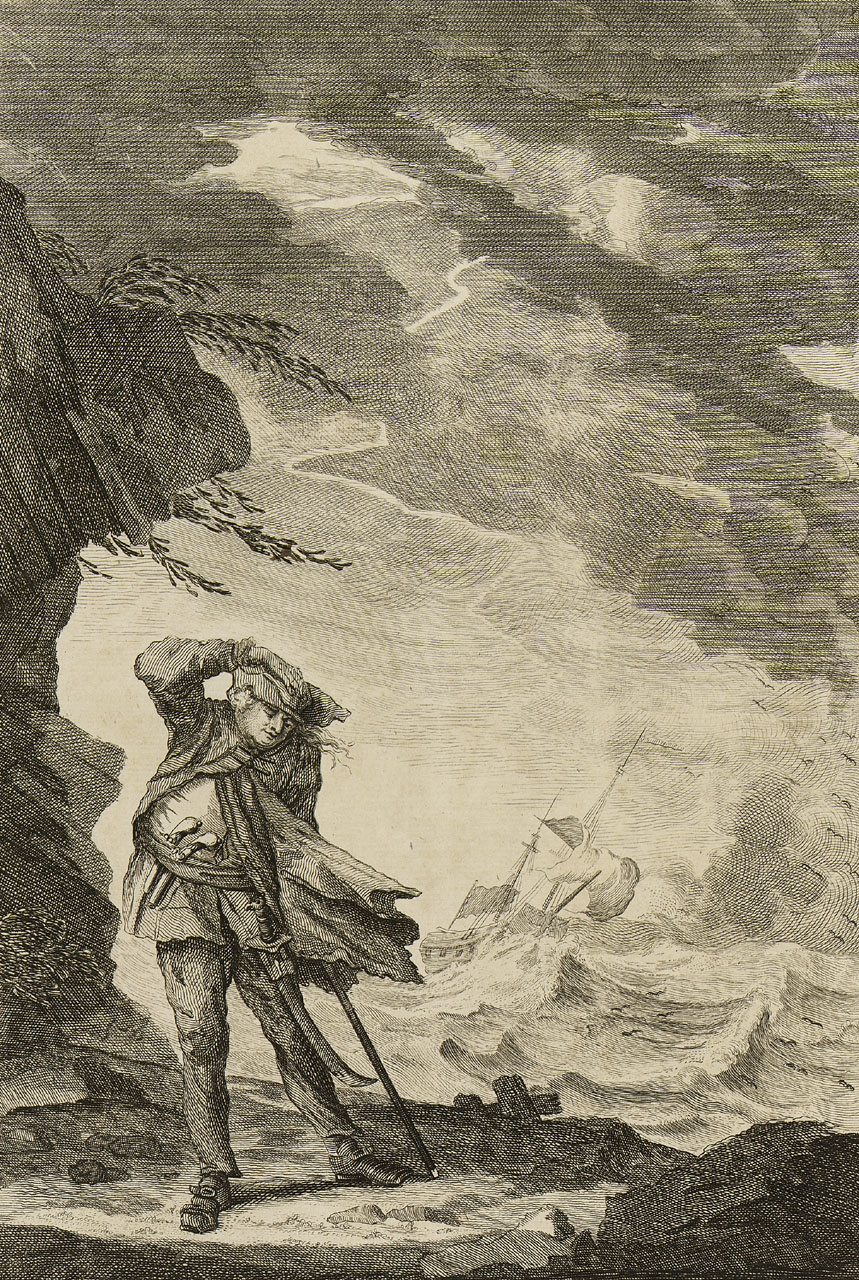
- Portrait of Low
- Born: 1690; Westminster, Middlesex
- Died: Disputed (1724, or 1739+); Place of death disputed
- Piratical career
- Nickname: Ned Low
- Type: Pirate
- Years active: c.1721–c.1724 (possibly to 1739+)
- Rank: Captain
- Base of operations: Atlantic; Caribbean
- Commands: Rebecca; Fancy; Rose Pink; Ranger; Fancy; Merry Christmas

Edward Low, also known as Ned Low (other spellings include Lowe and Loe; c. 1690–1724), was an English pirate active in the early 18th century during the final years of the Golden Age of Piracy. Low was born into poverty in Westminster and was a thief from an early age. He moved to Boston, Massachusetts, as a young man. His wife died in childbirth in late 1719. Two years later, he became a pirate, operating off the coasts of New England, Nova Scotia, the Azores, and in the Caribbean.

Low captained a number of ships, usually maintaining a small fleet of three or four. Low and his pirate crews captured at least a hundred ships during his short career, burning most of them. Although he was active for only three years, Low remains notorious as one of the most vicious pirates of the age, with a reputation for violently torturing his victims before murdering them.

Sir Arthur Conan Doyle described Low as "savage and desperate", and a man of "amazing and grotesque brutality." The New York Times called him a torturer, whose methods would have "done credit to the ingenuity of the Spanish Inquisition in its darkest days." The circumstances of Low's death, which took place around 1724, have been the subject of much speculation.

== Early life ==
According to Charles Johnson's A General History of the Pyrates, Edward Low was born in Westminster, Middlesex, England, in 1690. He was described as illiterate, having a "quarrelsome nature", and always ready to cheat, running "wild in the streets of his native parish". As a young man, he was said to be a pickpocket and gambler, playing games of chance with the footmen of the nearby House of Commons.

Most of his family appear to have been thieves. While young, his brother, Richard, was small for his age and is said to have been carried around in a basket on a friend's back; in a crowd, Richard would snatch the hats and wigs of passers-by. Richard later took to other forms of criminal activity and ended up hanged at Tyburn in 1707 for the burglary of a house in Stepney.

== Life in Boston ==
As he advanced in age, Low tired of pickpocketing and thievery and turned to burglary. Eventually, he left England, and traveled alone to the New World around 1710. He spent three to four years in various locations, before settling in Boston, Massachusetts. On 12 August 1714, he married Eliza Marble at the First Church of Boston. They had a son, who died when he was an infant, and then a daughter named Elizabeth, born in the winter of 1719.

Eliza died in childbirth, leaving Low with his infant daughter. The loss of his wife had a profound effect on Low: in his later career of piracy, he would often express regret for the daughter he left behind, and refused to press-gang married men into joining his crews. He would also allow women to return to port safely. At first working honestly as a rigger, in early 1722 he joined a gang of twelve men on a sloop headed for Honduras, where they planned to collect a shipment of logs for resale in Boston.

Low was employed as a patron, supervising the loading and carrying of the logs. One day, he returned to the ship hungry, but was told by the captain he would have to wait to eat, and that he and his men would have to be satisfied with their ration of rum. At this, Low "took up a loaded musket and fired at the captain but missed him, [and] shot another poor fellow through the throat".

Following this failed mutiny, Low and his friends were forced to leave the boat. A day later, Low led the twelve-man gang, including Francis Farrington Spriggs, who went on to become a notorious pirate in his own right, to commandeer a small sloop off the coast of Rhode Island. Killing one man during the theft, Low and his crew turned pirate, determined "to go in her, make a black Flag, and declare War against all the World."

== Piracy ==
=== First mate ===
Low, using his newly captured ship, lay in wait on a popular shipping route between Boston and New York. Within a few days, he and his crew seized a sloop out of Rhode Island and plundered it. His crew cut the rigging away to prevent the sloop returning too quickly to port to raise the alarm. He then captured a number of unarmed merchantmen near Port Rosemary.

Of all the pyratical crews that were ever heard of, none of the English name came up to this, in barbarity. Their mirth and their anger had much the same effect, for both were usually gratified with the cries and groans of their prisoners; so that they almost as often murdered a man from the excess of good humour, as out of passion and resentment; and the unfortunate could never be assured of safety from them, for danger lurked in their very smiles.

— Captain Charles Johnson on Low's brutality.

Low headed south and began operating in the waters of Grand Cayman, including being lieutenant to the established pirate George Lowther, who captained the Happy Delivery, a 100-ton Rhode Island sloop with eight cannon and ten swivel guns. When she was "destroyed by Indians", Lowther and his crew transferred to a sloop named the Ranger. Lowther's crew was constantly expanded by desperate sailors willing to join him. Fast acquiring a taste for cruelty, Low taught Spriggs a torture technique that involved tying a victim's hands with rope between their fingers and setting it alight, burning their flesh down to the bones.

Following a number of successful raids, Lowther eventually captured a large 6-gun brigantine named Rebecca on 28 May 1722. He gave it to Low to captain. With a crew of 44, Low amicably dissolved his partnership with Lowther.

=== Pirate captain ===
In one notable raid in June 1722, Low and his crew attacked thirteen New England fishing vessels sheltering at anchor in Port Roseway, Shelburne, Nova Scotia. Although outnumbered, Low hoisted his Jolly Roger flag and declared that no mercy would be given to the fishermen if any resisted. The fleet submitted and Low's men robbed every vessel. Low chose the largest, an 80-ton schooner, which he renamed The Fancy, armed with 10 guns, to become his flagship. He sank the other ships of the fleet and abandoned the Rebecca.

The Boston News-Letter of 9 July 1722 published a list of those captured by Low. A number of the fishermen were forced to join Low, including Philip Ashton, who escaped in May 1723 on Roatán Island in the Bay Islands of Honduras, and who wrote a detailed account of life aboard Low's pirate ship. Before Ashton's escape, he had been beaten, whipped, kept in chains, and threatened with death many times – particularly by Low's quartermaster John Russell – as he refused to sign Low's articles and become a pirate.

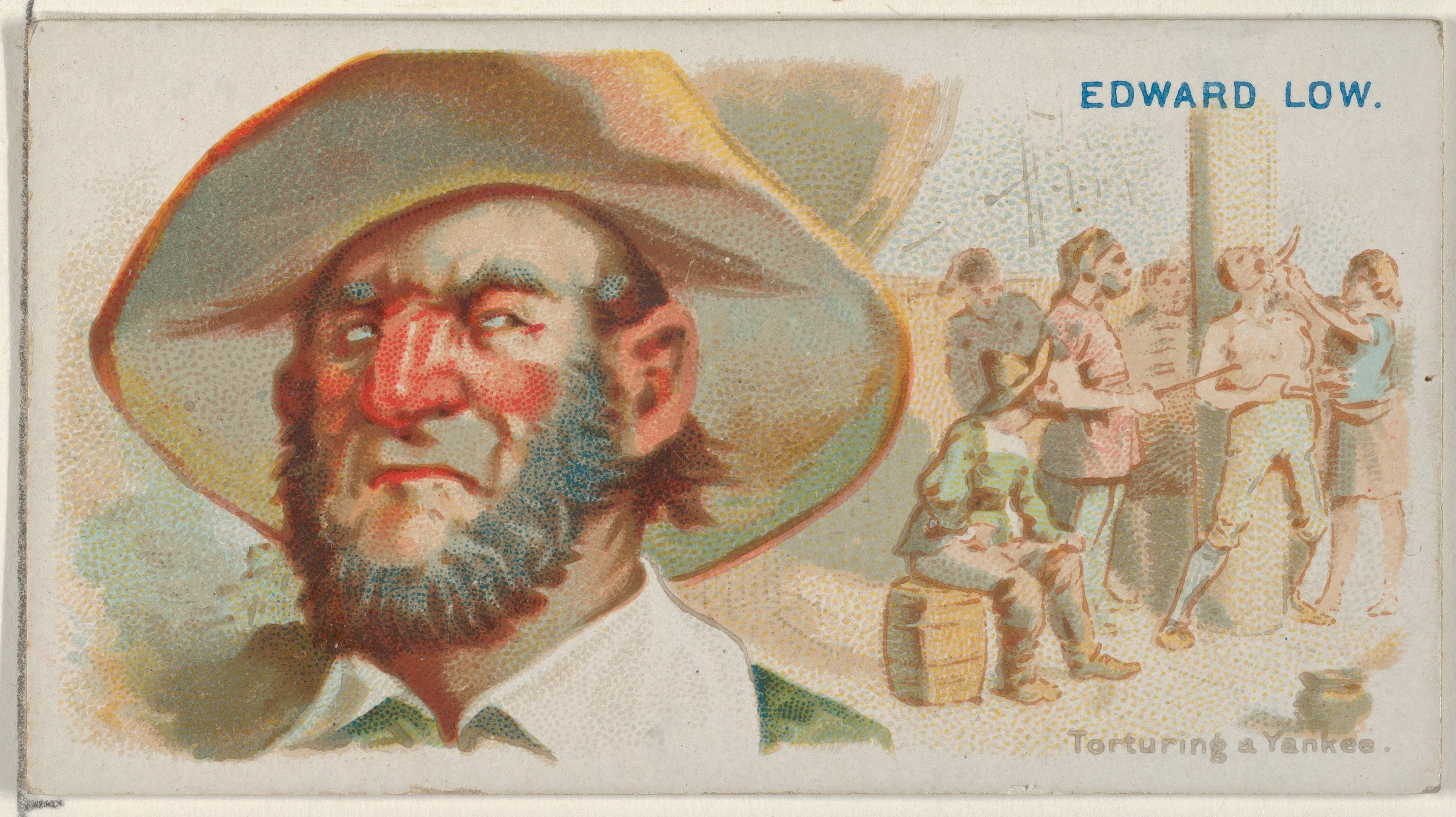
Edward Low, Torturing a Yankee, from the Pirates of the Spanish Main series (N19) for Allen & Ginter

Low's tactics consisted primarily of hoisting false colours and approaching an unsuspecting vessel. Off the coast of St. John's, Newfoundland, Low mistook a fully armed man-of-war for a fishing boat, and barely escaped. He moved on to Conception Bay, capturing a number of boats around the Grand Banks southeast of Newfoundland before crossing the Atlantic to the Azores. There, he captured a French (or Portuguese—sources differ) pink, a narrow-sterned former man of war, which Low rearmed and refitted as his new flagship, naming it the Rose Pink. He also captured an English vessel with two Portuguese passengers aboard. Low had his crew hoist them up and drop them back down from the yardarm several times, until they died. He moved on to the Canaries, Cape Verde and then back to the coast of Brazil, where he was driven back by foul weather.

Captain Loe, with the usual Compliments, welcomed me on board, and told me, He was very sorry for my Loss, and that it was not his Desire to meet with any of his Country-men, but rather with Foreigners, excepting some few that he wanted to chastise for their Rogueishness, as he call'd it.

— Captain George Roberts (possibly assisted by Daniel Defoe) on his meeting with Low.

Low abandoned his plans of plundering the rich shipping trade off the coast of Brazil and moved on to the Caribbean. George Roberts, captain of a sloop trading from Barbados to West Africa, recounted a meeting with Low aboard the Rose Pink at the Cape de Verde Islands. Roberts' ship was captured by Low's fleet, of which he was now styling himself "Commodore".

=== Capsizing of the Rose Pink ===
Forty leagues (120 nautical miles or around 220 km) to the east of Surinam, Low and his fleet of two ships (the Rose Pink and the Fancy, captained by a young Charles Harris) dropped anchor to remove growth such as seaweed and barnacles from the outside and bottom of the boats, in a process known as careening; no dry dock was available to pirates.

Still relatively inexperienced, Low ordered too many men to the outside of the boat to work on the buildup, and the Rose Pink tipped too far. The portholes had been left open, and the vessel took on water and sank, taking two men with her. The Rose Pink had been carrying most of the provisions. Low was captaining a schooner, the Squirrel—and his crew were forced to strictly ration their fresh water to half a pint (around 275 ml) per man, per day.

Failing to reach their initial destination of Tobago due to light winds and strong currents, Low's depleted fleet made it to Grenada, a French-owned island. Hiding most of his men below deck, he was permitted to send men ashore for water. The following day, a French sloop was sent out to investigate, but was captured when Low's men emerged from hiding. Low, now commanding the captured sloop (renamed the Ranger), gave the schooner Squirrel to Spriggs, his quartermaster, who renamed it the Delight, before sailing away in the middle of the night with a small crew following a disagreement with Low over the disciplining of one of Spriggs' crew.

=== Early 1723 ===
The Pyrates [were] waiting there for them, took them and Plundered them; they cut and whiped some and others they burnt with Matches between their Fingers to the bone to make them confess where their Money was, they took to the value of a Thousand Pistoles from Passengers and others, they then let them go, but coming on the Coast off of the Capes of Virginia, they were again chased by the same Pyrates who first took them, they did not trouble them again but wished them well Home, they saw at the same time his Consort, a Sloop of eight Guns, with a Ship and a Sloop which were supposed to be Prizes, they were Commanded by one Edward LOW. The Pyrates gave us an account of his taking the Bay of Hondoras from the Spaniards, which had surprised the English and taking them, and putting all the Spaniards to the Sword Excepting two boys, as also burning The King George, and a Snow belonging to New York, and sunk one of the New England Ships, and cut off one the Masters Ears and slit his Nose, all this they confessed themselves.

— The American Weekly Mercury, 6 June–13, 1723

Low's new fleet captured many more sloops, including one that Low kept, naming it the Fortune. During a trial on 10 July 1723 for a number of Low's crew members, a sailor on board the Fortune, John Welland, recalled how Low stripped his boat, including gold to the value of £150, then beat him and cut off his ear with a cutlass.

Following this, Low's fleet captured a Portuguese ship called the Nostra Signiora de Victoria on 25 January 1723. The Victoria's captain allowed a bag containing approximately 11,000 gold moidores (worth at the time around £15,000) to fall into the sea rather than see it captured. One of Low's most noted episodes of cruelty followed: in his rage, he slashed off the Portuguese captain's lips with a cutlass, broiled them, and forced the victim to eat them while still hot. He then murdered the remaining crew. Low's own men described him as "a maniac and a brute."

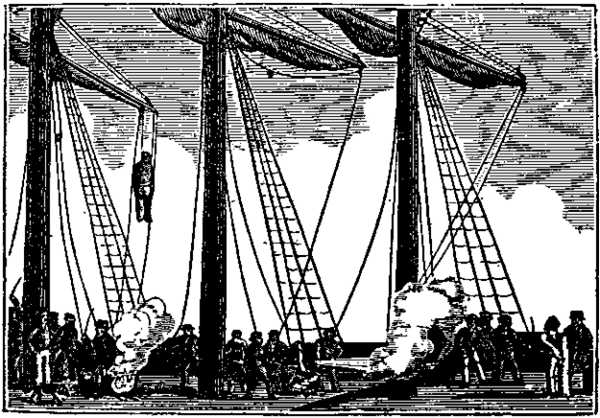
The Cruelties practised by Captain Low, from A Pirate's Own Book (1837)

One story describes Low burning a French cook alive, saying he was a "greasy fellow who would fry well"; another tells how he once killed 53 Spanish captives with his cutlass. Some historians, including David Cordingly, believe this was deliberately done to cultivate a ferocious image. Historian Edward Leslie described Low as a psychopath with a history filled with "mutilations, disembowelings, decapitations, and slaughter".

Low, like other pirates of the time, tried to intimidate his victims into surrendering by threatening to kill or torture them. The crew of the targeted ship would hinder their officers from defending her, so afraid were they of reprisals. One failed torture session led to one of Low's crew members accidentally cutting him in the mouth. Botched surgery left Low scarred.

A snow called the Unity was added to the fleet and used as a tender, but was abandoned during an encounter with a man of war named the Mermaid. As Low's success increased in the Caribbean, so did his notoriety. Eventually, a bounty was placed on his head, and Low set out for the Azores, again teaming up with Charles Harris. As they terrorised the Azores, the pressure increased from the authorities, who by then had taken special notice of Low, despite the other hordes of pirates in operation at the time.

=== A defeat ===
Low presenting a Pistol and Bowl of Punch, from A Pirate's Own Book (1837)

Low, Harris and their ships left the Azores for the Carolinas. On 10 June 1723, they suffered a resounding defeat in a battle with HMS Greyhound, a heavily armed man of war. Greyhound had been dispatched under the command of Peter Solgard to hunt down Low and his fleet. Low fled in the Fancy with a skeleton crew and £150,000 in gold on board and headed back to the Azores, leaving Harris and the Ranger behind.

Twenty-five of the crew of the Ranger, including the ship's doctor, were tried between 10 July and 12 July, with Solgard giving evidence and recounting the battle. The men were hanged for felony, piracy, and robbery near Newport, Rhode Island, on 19 July 1723. Harris was sent back to England and hanged at Execution Dock in Wapping. When Solgard returned to New York, he was presented with the freedom of the city and a gold snuffbox for his part in bringing some of Low's crew to justice.

=== End of Low's career ===
Low, still captaining the Fancy, sailed north. He captured a whaling vessel 80 miles (130 km) out at sea, and in a foul mood following the encounter with the Greyhound and the loss of Harris, he tortured the captain before shooting him through the head. He set the whaler's crew adrift with no provisions, intending them to starve to death. They were lucky and reached Nantucket, Massachusetts after a difficult journey. Remaining off the coast of North America, Low's crew took a fishing boat near Block Island. Low decapitated the ship's master, and sent the crew ashore. When he captured two more fishing boats near Rhode Island, his actions became so savage that his crew refused to carry out his orders to torture the fishermen.

Heading south again, Low captured a 22 gun French ship and a large Virginian merchant vessel, the Merry Christmas, in late June 1723. Following the defeat by the Greyhound, Low became "peculiarly cruel" to his English victims. His fleet of three ships rejoined forces with George Lowther in July. In late 1723, Low and Lowther's fleet captured the Delight off the coast of Guinea, mounting fourteen guns on her, with command being given to Spriggs. Two days later, Spriggs and Lowther both abandoned Low, leaving him the Merry Christmas, by now mounted with 34 guns, as his sole ship.

=== Fate ===
There are conflicting reports on the circumstances of Low's death. Captain Charles Johnson—considered by some to be Daniel Defoe writing under a pseudonym—in his A General History of the Pyrates, stated that Low and the Fancy were last sighted near the Canaries and Guinea. However, at the time of his 1724 book, no further reports had surfaced. He noted one rumour that Low was sailing for Brazil and another that Low's ship sank in a storm with the loss of all hands. The National Maritime Museum in London states that he was never caught, ending his days in Brazil.

Charles Ellms suggests in The Pirates Own Book that Low was set adrift without provisions by the crew of the Merry Christmas in a mutiny brought about by Low's murder of a sleeping subordinate following an argument. His crew elected Captain Shipton to command the Merry Christmas; they would go on to sail alongside Spriggs in the Caribbean. Low was subsequently rescued by a French ship. When the French authorities learned of his identity he was brought to trial and was hanged in Martinique in 1724.

Men of HMS Diamond reported encountering a periagua with nine men aboard in March 1726, recognising one of them as Low. Diamond had lost her canoe and could not give chase, leaving Low to his fate near Roatan, where he was supposedly killed by the indigenous Miskito. Still later in late 1739, a man identified as the "famous Ned Low, formerly well known here for his piracies" was spotted escaping a Spanish fort at Porto Bello. He had been among the fort's gun crews when the city was attacked by British forces during the War of Jenkins' Ear. However, this may have been a mistake and may have been referring to George Lowther; Admiral Edward Vernon reported receiving intelligence from Lowther before his assault on Portobelo, indicating that it was Lowther spotted earlier at Porto Bello, not Low:

The Strafford and Norwich, with all the small vessels being watered, the admiral got out to sea on the 22d, being the better enabled to undertake the expedition as during his stay at Porto Bello, he had got an exact draught of all the coast from Porto Bello to Chagre, and of the mouth of that river, and the shoal before it, from Lowther the pirate, who by this piece of service to his country, took the opportunity of obtaining his pardon, and returning to England.

== Flags ==
Artist's impression of Low's alleged initial flag

Artist's impression of the pirate flag used by Low

Artist's impression of the Green Trumpeter flag used by Low

Initially, Low used the same flag as his associates Francis Spriggs and Charles Harris: a skeleton holding an hourglass and a spear stabbing a heart on a black field. Later, he used his own flag, a red skeleton on a black background, which became notorious. He first flew his own flag in late July 1723. Low also used a green silk flag with a yellow figure of a man blowing a trumpet; this Green Trumpeter was hoisted on the mizzen peak to call his fleet's captains to meetings aboard the flagship.

== Articles ==
Low had a set of Articles, a code of conduct. The Articles listed below are attributed to Low by The Boston News-Letter. The first eight of these articles are essentially identical to those attributed to Lowther by Charles Johnson.

It is likely that both reports are correct and that Low and Lowther shared the same articles, with Low's two extra articles being an ordonnance, or amendment, adopted after the two crews separated.

I. The Captain is to have two full Shares; the [Quarter] Master is to have one Share and one Half; The Doctor, Mate, Gunner and Boatswain, one Share and one Quarter.

II. He that shall be found guilty of taking up any Unlawfull Weapon on Board the Privateer or any other prize by us taken, so as to Strike or Abuse one another in any regard, shall suffer what Punishment the Captain and the Majority of the Company shall see fit.

III. He that shall be found Guilty of Cowardice in the time of Ingagements, shall suffer what Punishment the Captain and the Majority of the Company shall think fit.

IV. If any Gold, Jewels, Silver, &c. be found on Board of any Prize or Prizes to the value of a Piece of Eight, & the finder do not deliver it to the Quarter Master in the space of 24 hours he shall suffer what Punishment the Captain and the Majority of the Company shall think fit.

V. He that is found Guilty of Gaming, or Defrauding one another to the value of a Royal of Plate, shall suffer what Punishment the Captain and the Majority of the Company shall think fit.

VI. He that shall have the Misfortune to loose a Limb in time of Engagement, shall have the Sum of Six hundred pieces of Eight, and remain aboard as long as he shall think fit.

VII. Good Quarters to be given when Craved.

VIII. He that sees a Sail first, shall have the best Pistol or Small Arm aboard of her.

IX. He that shall be guilty of Drunkenness in time of Engagement shall suffer what Punishment the Captain and Majority of the Company shall think fit.

X. No Snaping of Guns in the Hould.

== Legacy ==
Artist's impression of Ned Low by Marc Davis in 1962, now on the Pirates of the Caribbean theme park ride at Disneyland. Photo by Mike Johansen.

Edward Low's acts, along with those of other pirates of the period such as Edward "Blackbeard" Teach, Bartholomew Roberts, and William Fly, led to a great increase in the military presence to protect shipping lanes, resulting in the effective end of the Golden Age of Piracy.

By 1700, the European states had enough troops and ships at their disposal, following the end of a number of wars, to begin better protecting their important colonies in the West Indies and in the Americas without relying on the aid of privateers. Pirates based in the Caribbean were chased from the seas by a new British squadron based at Port Royal, Jamaica, and a smaller group of Spanish privateers, sailing from the Spanish Main, known as the Guarda de Costa, or simply the Guarda.

Less is recorded of Low than of other equally prolific pirates such as Teach and Stede Bonnet. Howard Pyle, in an 1880 children's book on pirates, said: "No one stood higher in the trade than [Low], and no one mounted to more lofty altitudes of bloodthirsty and unscrupulous wickedness. 'Tis strange that so little has been written and sung of this man of might, for he was as worthy of story and of song as was Blackbeard." Sir Arthur Conan Doyle, in his short story "Tales of the High Seas: 3. The Voyage of Copley Banks", described Low as "savage and desperate", and a man of "amazing and grotesque brutality". The New York Times said "Low and his crew became the terror of the Atlantic, and his depredations were committed on every part of the ocean, from the coast of Brazil to the Grand Banks of Newfoundland".

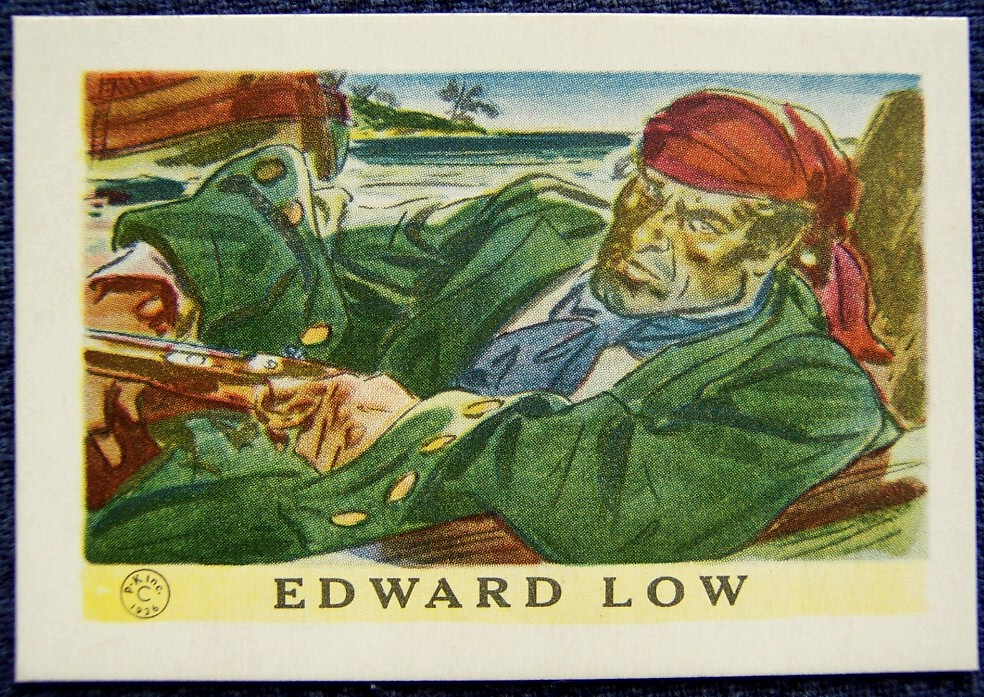
A 1936 Pac-Kups Jolly Roger Pirate card featuring an artist's impression of Edward Low

Low has featured on stamps and commemorative currency around the Caribbean. A postage stamp featuring Low was commissioned by the Cayman Islands in 1975, and in 1994 the government of Antigua and Barbuda featured Low and his brigantine Rebecca on a legal tender one hundred-dollar bill made of gold leaf.

"Ned Low" is one of the pirates featured on the Pirates of the Caribbean ride at the Disneyland theme park in California. A duplicate of Low's flag was used for the fictional pirate Sao Feng in Disney's Pirates of the Caribbean films. Tadhg Murphy portrayed Low in the 2015 season of the Starz TV series Black Sails. Bronson Pinchot depicted Low in a 2023 episode of the Max TV series Our Flag Means Death.

Some of Low's haunts, such as the waters around the Isles of Shoals off New Hampshire and Isle Haute in Nova Scotia, attract treasure hunters who seek artifacts from ships he sank.

== See also ==
- List of pirates
- Piracy in the Caribbean
- Privateer
