= George Lowther (pirate) =

18th-century English pirate

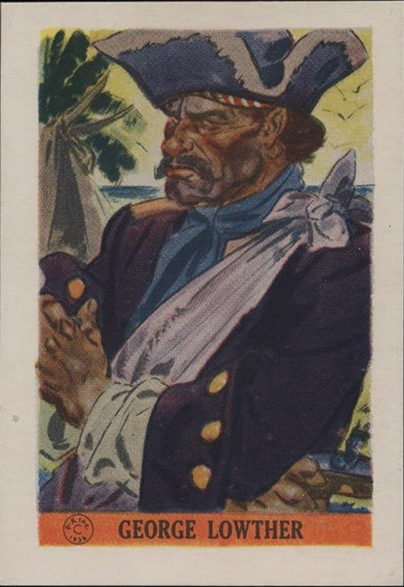
A scan of a 1936 Jolly Roger Cups Pirate card of the pirate George Lowther.

George Lowther was an English pirate who, although little is known of his life, was reportedly active in the Caribbean and Atlantic during the early 18th century. He was known for his association with Edward Low.

== Turn to piracy ==
George Lowther's pirate flag, described as "a black ensign with a death in it"

Not much is known about him before becoming the second mate on the slave ship Gambia Castle, which was under the command of Captain Charles Russell; however, Lowther was more popular with the crew, as Russell seemed to care more about his shipment of slaves than for his men. Russell distrusted Lowther, and when he attempted to have him flogged, many crew members took Lowther's side and defended him, causing a schism among the crew.

Also on board, after retreating from their fort, was a Captain Massey, along with a company of soldiers under his command. One night, while Captain Russell was offboard, Massey and Lowther decided to set sail without him. Massey intended to return to England, but Lowther, the crew, and Massey's own soldiers disagreed. Lowther was made captain and he renamed the Gambia Castle as Delivery. They attacked many ships but when Massey wanted to pillage a village on shore, he lost the vote as the risk was deemed too great. Lowther was able to obtain a smaller ship, named the Happy Delivery, and parted ways with Massey and his men.

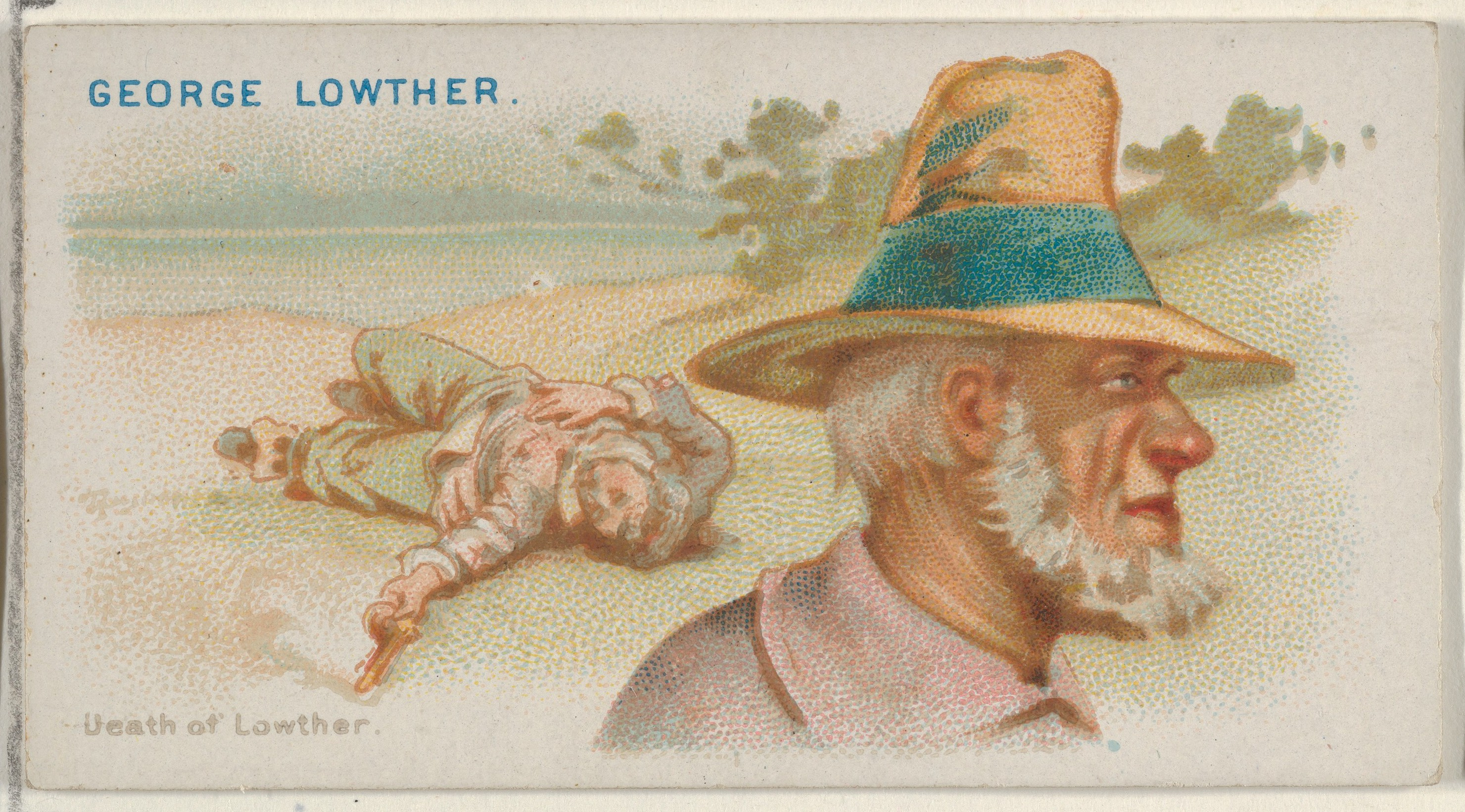
George Lowther, Death of Lowther, from the Pirates of the Spanish Main series (N19) for Allen & Ginter Cigarettes MET DP835021

Lowther left for the Carolinas, where he developed the tactic of ramming his ship into another, while his men boarded and looted it. Around 1721 he left for the Grand Caymans, where he ran into the Greyhound captained by Benjamin Edwards. Lowther gave a cannon shot for a signal. Greyhound responded with a broadside (simultaneous discharge of all cannons on a side of a ship). The pirates boarded the Greyhound, possibly killed the entire crew and burnt the ship. Lowther had many ships under his command by now, granting the six-gun brigantine Rebecca to his lieutenant Edward Low, who left to begin his own pirate career and with whom Lowther and Francis Spriggs would briefly rejoin in late 1723. When Lowther sailed his fleet to Guatemala, they were attacked by natives, and he was forced to leave some ships and men behind. His crew and supplies were all transferred to the Revenge.

== Fate ==
Sources conflict on the end of Lowther's career. In 1722 he sailed to a secluded island called Blanquilla. However, before landing he was spotted by Walter Moore, commander of HMS Eagle. Lowther was able to escape to the island by slipping out of his cabin window, along with a dozen crewmen; only four made it to shore. Johnson's General History claimed that after an extensive search Lowther's body was found; he had shot himself in the head rather than be taken prisoner.

The Daily Courant of 12 June 1724 indeed reported that "The Master of the Eagle was afterwards informed, that George Lowther, the Captain of the said Pyrate Sloop, had shot himself on the said Island of Blanko, and was found dead with his Pistol burst by his Side."

However, The Post-Boy newspaper dated 2 May 1724 suggested that Lowther may have escaped. The newspaper reports:

The last Letters from S. Christopher bring Advice, that on the 20th of February, the Eagle Sloop, h_ted out from that Island, had brought in thither the Pyrate Sloop she had taken from Lowther, with twenty of the Men that were on board, (Lowther himself and many of the Crew having made their Escape) and it was believed that twelve or thirteen of them would be convicted of Pyracy, and that the others would be clear’d, as being forced into the said Pyrates Service.

The same information is in Newcastle Courant newspaper dated 1 February 1724:

We have the good News from St. Christophers, that Captain Moor of the Eagle Sloop, discovering a Pyrate Sloop of 10 Guns, and 40 Men, commanded by Lowther, careening at the Island of Blanco, boarded, and took her, with 24 of her Men, but Lowther, and 10 more, jump'd over board, and escap'd, however 4 of them were afterwards taken by a Spanish Cannoe, and 'tis hoped Lowther and the Rest would be also taken.

Lowther apparently survived, though, having lived in Panama for 16 years. Admiral Edward Vernon reported receiving intelligence from Lowther during his assault on Portobelo:

The Strafford and Norwich, with all the small vessels being watered, the admiral got out to sea on the 22d, being the better enabled to undertake the expedition as during his stay at Porto Bello, he had got an exact draught of all the coast from Porto Bello to Chagre, and of the mouth of that river, and the shoal before it, from Lowther the pirate, who by this piece of service to his country, took the opportunity of obtaining his pardon, and returning to England.

Lowther was not only granted a pardon but was commissioned as a lieutenant in the Royal Navy as a reward for his assistance to Vernon.
