= Philip Ashton =

American castaway (1702–1746)

- Born: 1702; Marblehead, Massachusetts, U.S.
- Died: 1746 (aged 43–44); Massachusetts, U.S.
- Known for: Castaway who lived on an uninhabited island for 16 months

Philip Ashton (1702—1746) was a castaway on then-uninhabited Roatán island in the Gulf of Honduras for 16 months in 1723/1724. His memoirs about his solitary stay were published in book form in Boston in 1725. While some people believed it was a novel in the style of Robinson Crusoe (1719), Ashton's book was the account of a genuine experience. He was born in Marblehead, Massachusetts in 1702 and married twice.

== Castaway life ==
In June 1722, Ashton was captured by pirates while fishing near the coast of Shelburne, Nova Scotia. In the Boston News Letter of 9 July 1722, Ashton was listed as being one of those captured by the pirate Edward Low. As Ashton refused to cooperate with the pirates, he was often threatened, especially by Low's quartermaster John Russell. He managed to escape in March 1723 when the pirates landed at Roatán Island in the Bay Islands of Honduras, hiding in the jungle until the pirates decided to depart without him. He survived for 16 months, in spite of many insects, tropical heat and alligators. In the beginning he seems to have eaten only fruit, because he only had his hands to collect food; he could not kill any animal. He had no equipment at all until he met another castaway, an Englishman. A few days later the Englishman "went out but he never returned." The Englishman left behind a knife, gunpowder, tobacco and more. Ashton could then kill tortoises and crayfish and make fires to have hot meals. Ashton was finally rescued by the Diamond, a ship from Salem, Massachusetts.

In 1725 Ashton's "Memorial" - a short recollection of his adventures - was published with the help of his minister. Daniel Defoe is believed to have incorporated elements of Ashton's story into his 1726 novel "The Four Years Voyages of Capt. George Roberts."

== See also ==
- List of kidnappings
- List of solved missing person cases

== Books ==
- Barnard, John. History of the Strange Adventures and Signal Deliverances of Mr. Philip Ashton, publ. by Samuel Gerrish, Boston (1725) (online source)
- Flemming, Gregory. At the Point of a Cutlass, ForeEdge (2014) ISBN 978-1611685152 (online information)
- Leslie, Edward E.. Desperate Journeys, abandoned Souls, Houghton Mifflin (1988) ISBN 978-0395478646
- Neider, Charles. Great Shipwrecks and Castaways, Harper & Brothers (1952) ISBN 978-0880294645
- Ashton's memorial. An history of the strange adventures, and signal deliverances, of Mr. Philip Ashton, who, after he had made his escape from the pirates, liv'd alone on a desolate island for about sixteen months.
- Andrews, Michael. Stranded in Roatan: The true account of escape from pirates by Philip Ashton in 1722 (online information)
