= Samuel Inless =

- Occupation: Pirate
- Years active: 1698-1699
- Known for: Serving as Captain over Nathaniel North and George Booth
- Piratical career
- Rank: Captain
- Base of operations: Indian Ocean
- Commands: Dolphin

Samuel Inless (fl. 1698–1699) was a pirate captain in the Indian Ocean, best known for serving as Captain over Nathaniel North and George Booth.

== History ==
When captain Robert Colley of the Pelican took ill and died in 1698, his crew (which included future captains Nathaniel North and George Booth) elected ship's cooper Joseph Wheeler as captain. They sailed briefly with Dirk Chivers and Robert Culliford, then sailed alone to take three ships off India's Malabar coast, keeping a 26-gun ship and renaming it Dolphin.

Near Mascarenas a hurricane dismasted their ships, so they returned to Île Sainte-Marie near Madagascar to make repairs and divide their loot. They found Culliford and Chivers again, alongside several merchantmen. Wheeler and some of the Dolphin's crew gave up piracy and returned with the merchantmen. The rest of the crew elected island resident Samuel Inless as the Dolphin’s new captain.

Inless retained Nathaniel North as quartermaster and George Booth as gunner. Sailing for the Straits of Malacca they took several small Moorish ships which were “but of little value to them.” Finally in 1699 they captured a large Danish ship, which they took to the Nicobars for use in careening the Dolphin. They returned to Saint Mary's to divide the plunder, amounting to £400 per share. Shortly afterwards a squadron of British warships under Commodore Thomas Warren arrived, offering clemency to all pirates who renounced their ways. Culliford and some others accepted the offer; North fled in a longboat, later joining John Halsey, and Booth escaped to sail with John Bowen. Inless himself refused the pardon and burned the Dolphin, but his ultimate fate is unknown.

== See also ==
- James Littleton - succeeded Warren (who dies in 1699) as Commodore, and returned to Madagascar to finish dealing with the pirates.
