= David Williams (pirate) =

Welsh sailor and pirate

David Williams (fl. 1698–1709, last name occasionally Wallin) was a Welsh sailor who turned pirate after being abandoned on Madagascar. He was only briefly a captain, and is best known for sailing under a number of more prominent pirate captains. (Note: Williams' story appears only in Volume 2 of "A General History of the Pyrates" by Captain Charles Johnson (a pen name of Daniel Defoe, Nathaniel Mist, or someone similar). Other versions in Grey, Gosse, etc. are largely retellings of the Johnson version, so verifying the authenticity of Williams' story is difficult.)

== History ==
Williams was a crewman aboard the East India Company ship Mary in the 1690s. At Madagascar Williams swam ashore to help the Mary replenish its water supplies. High waves and rough surf prevented them from retrieving Williams from ashore so they departed without him. He was taken in by a friendly Malagasy tribe and fought alongside them in various tribal wars. He served several different local Kings who had him command their troops after seeing his bravery and skill in battle.

Around 1698 he made his way to a settlement headed by ex-pirate Abraham Samuel and began his own period of piracy. He first joined Evan Jones aboard the Beckford Galley. Jones’ ship was wrecked while careening so Williams joined the Pelican, captained by Joseph Wheeler (or possibly Robert Colley). He also sailed with Robert Culliford on the Mocha, with George Booth aboard the Speaker, and with Thomas Howard on the Prosperous. Howard's men went ashore to visit former pirate Aert Van Tuyl (“Ort Van Tyle”); when they heard Van Tuyl had earlier attacked another group of pirates, (Note: Likely this was Thomas Mostyn: "they sail'd to St. Mary's, where Captain Mosson's Ship lay at Anchor, between the Island and the Main: This Gentleman and his whole Ship's Company had been cut off, at the Instigation of Ort Vantyle, a Dutchman of New-York.") they fought and in the ensuing battle Williams was captured.

Van Tuyl kept Williams as a slave, though he escaped several months later. He lived for a year with a Malagasy Prince before joining a pirate settlement led by Dutchman John Pro. Williams, Pro, and others were captured by a Royal Navy frigate; escaping again, Williams joined pirate Thomas White for a time. By 1706 he was sailing with John Halsey aboard the Charles. When Halsey returned to Madagascar in 1707, Williams departed and assisted a local King in tribal conflicts.

Halsey then seized the Scottish slave ship Neptune. He died soon after and Williams was elected Captain, with Samuel Burgess as quartermaster, but the Neptune was almost immediately wrecked in a storm. Burgess and Williams then engaged in slave trading until Burgess was killed after arguing with a local chieftain. Williams fitted out a small ship to go pirating but poor navigation and contrary winds kept his ship confined close to shore. Finally he sailed to the Arab settlement of Boyn to trade. (Note: Some versions of the story claim Williams came to raid Boyn, not to trade. The raid was a disaster: the pirates were defeated while Williams was captured, tortured, and killed.) Williams had only five men with him at the time; troops sent by the Governor of Boyn ambushed him and his men, killing all of them and looting his sloop. A Malagasy King whom Williams had once aided was furious at the treatment Williams received at Boyn. In revenge he had the Governor of Boyn abducted and killed and said, “He was sorry the Villain had but one Life to make Atonement for the Barbarity he had been guilty of.”

== See also ==
- James Plaintain and Adam Baldridge – Two other ex-pirates who, like Abraham Samuel and John Pro, ran pirate trading settlements on or near Madagascar.
