= 1699 in piracy =

See also 1698 in piracy, 1700 in piracy, and Timeline of piracy.

== Events ==
=== Indian Ocean ===
- April - John Bowen and George Booth capture the slave ship Speaker near Mahajanga.
- September - Robert Culliford, Dirk Chivers, and several others, after being trapped by British vessels at St. Mary's Island, accept pardons from Thomas Warren.

=== North America ===
- Late April - Dutch pirate Hendrick van Hoven captures the 22-gun vessel Providence near Barbados. John James, a Welsh sailor aboard Providence before it was captured, mutinies with other members of the crew and becomes captain of the ship after marooning van Hoven on islands near Nassau.
- July 6 - William Kidd is arrested for piracy in New York, on the orders of Lord Governor Bellomont.
- July 27 - John James ransacks the sloop Roanoke Merchant.
- September 26 - Thomas Paine is first interrogated by authorities about William Kidd's fortune, claiming that it is not in his house.

== Births ==
- Thomas Sutton

== Deaths ==
- William Burke
- Dirk Chivers
