= A General History of the Pyrates =

1724/1726 book published in Britain

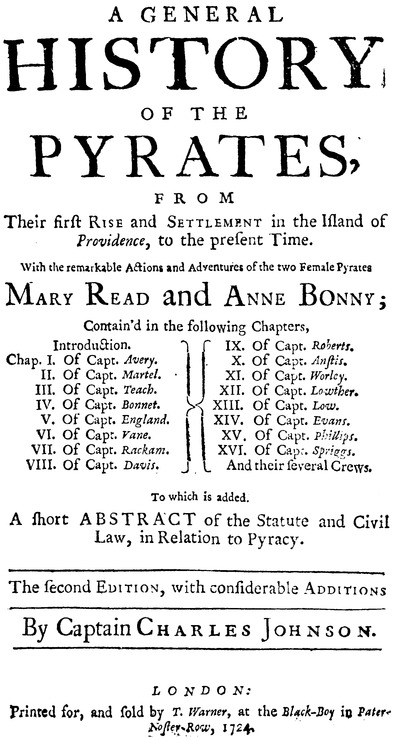
- Cover of the 2nd edition
- Author: Captain Charles Johnson (pen name, real identity unknown)
- Language: English
- Subject: Pirates
- Genre: Biographies
- Publisher: Ch. Rivington, J. Lacy, and J. Stone
- Publication date: 14 May 1724 (Vol 1); 1726 (Vol 2)
- Publication place: Great Britain
- Media type: Print
- Pages: 427 (Vol 1); 413 (Vol 2)
- Text: A General History of the Pyrates at Wikisource

A General History of the Pyrates (Note: Shortened from a longer name which varies by edition, longer names include A General History of the Robberies and Murders of the most notorious Pyrates and A General History of the Pyrates, from Their first Rise and Settlement in the Island of Providence, to the present Time. In addition the second volume uses the name The History of the Pyrates.), is a two volume book published in Britain containing biographies of contemporary pirates, which was influential in shaping popular conceptions of pirates. The prime source for the biographies of many well-known pirates, the book gives an almost mythical status to the more colourful characters, and it is likely that the author used considerable artistic license in his accounts of pirate conversations. The Oxford Research Encyclopedia of African History says that the work "is not a historical primary source but is a fabulous literary one", and that it is the root of a lot of confusion and misconceptions about the history of piracy.

Its author uses the name Captain Charles Johnson, generally considered a pen name for one of London's writer-publishers. The book also contains the first recorded use of the name Jolly Roger for the pirate flag, and shows the skull and crossbones design. It is not considered a reliable historical source by many modern scholars and academics of pirate history.

== History ==
First appearing in Charles Rivington's shop in London, the book sold so well that by 1726 an enlarged fourth edition had appeared. It pandered to the British public's taste for the exotic; revelling in graphic stories on the high seas. English naval historian David Cordingly writes: "It has been said, and there seems no reason to question this, that Captain Johnson created the modern conception of pirates." Scottish novelists Robert Louis Stevenson (author of Treasure Island) and J. M. Barrie (author of Peter Pan featuring Captain Hook) both identified Johnson's General History of the Pyrates as one of their major influences, and Stevenson even borrowed one character's name (Israel Hands) from a list of Blackbeard's crew which appeared in Johnson's book.

== Authorship ==
The author, who uses the name Captain Charles Johnson, has remained unknown in spite of numerous attempts by historians to discover their identity.

In 1932, literary scholar John Robert Moore argued that Daniel Defoe was the true author of A General History. Other sources, including a 2004 paper, suggest that the author could have been publisher Nathaniel Mist, or somebody working for Mist. Author Colin Woodard, in The Republic of Pirates, considers attribution of Johnson's work to Defoe to be erroneous, and prefers the hypothesis that Johnson was Mist. Other hypotheses include multiple writers including Mist being involved in the construction of the book.

== Contents ==
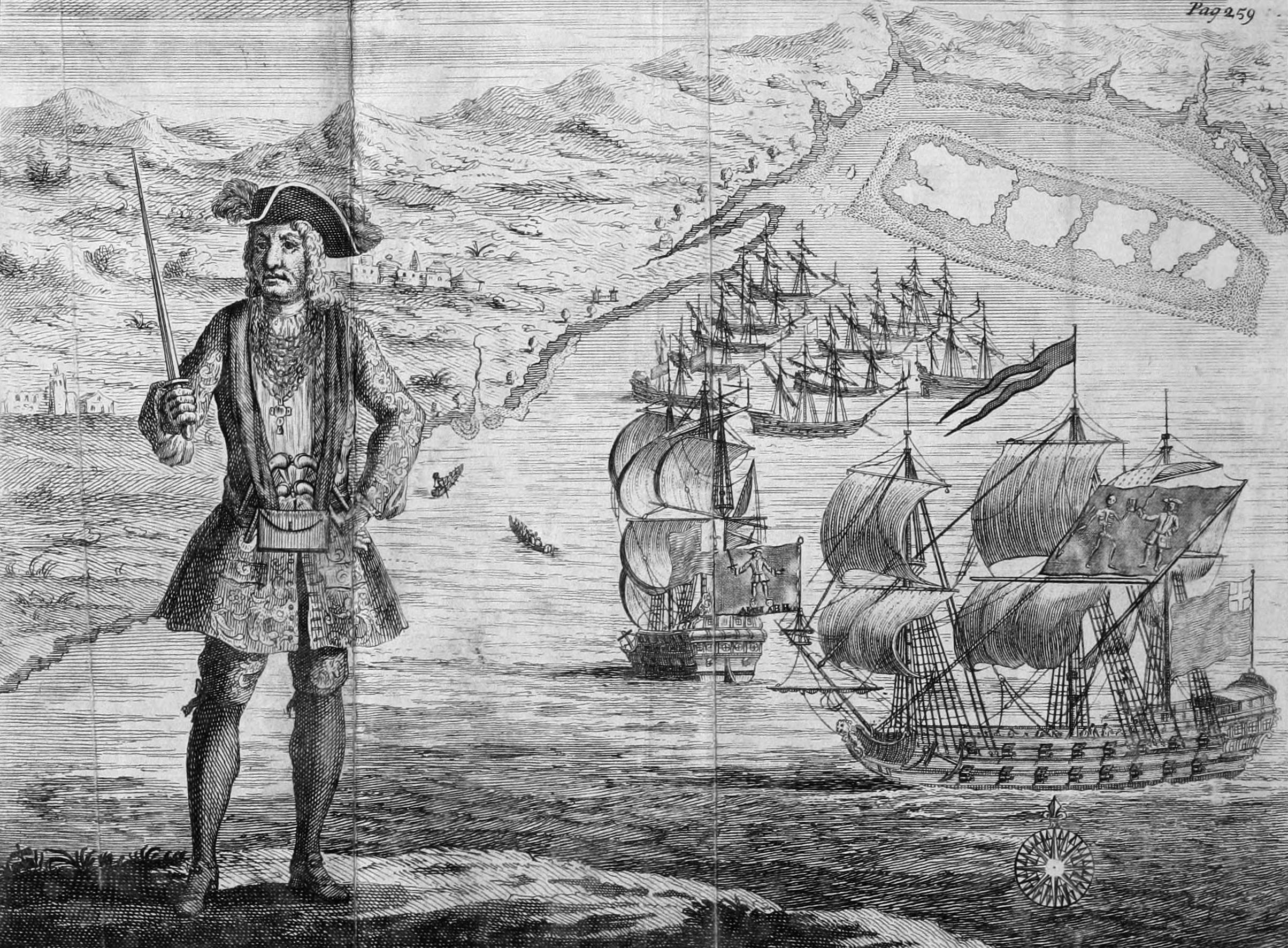
Illustration of Bartholomew Roberts in the 1724 edition

A General History introduced many features which later became common in pirate literature, such as pirates with missing legs or eyes, the notion of pirates burying treasure, and the name of the pirate flag the Jolly Roger. The author specifically cites two pirates as having named their flag Jolly Roger (named after the first Pirate and his crew): Welsh pirate Bartholomew Roberts in June 1721, and English pirate Francis Spriggs in December 1723. The book gives an almost mythical status to the more colourful characters, such as the infamous English pirates Blackbeard and Henry Every. It provides the standard account of the lives of many people still famous in the 21st century, and has influenced pirate literature of Scottish novelists Robert Louis Stevenson and J. M. Barrie.

The book was released in two volumes. The first mostly deals with early 18th-century pirates, while Volume II records the exploits of their predecessors a few decades earlier. In the first volume, the author sticks fairly close to the available sources, though the author embellishes the stories somewhat. The author stretches the truth farther in the second volume and includes the biographies of three subjects who may be entirely fictional. The book has been hugely influential in shaping popular notions of piracy.

The pirates profiled in Volume I are:

- Henry Avery
- James Martel
- Edward Teach (Black-beard)
- Stede Bonnet
- Edward England
- Charles Vane
- John Rackam
  - Mary Read
  - Anne Bonny
- Howel Davis
- Bartholomew Roberts
- Thomas Anstis
- Richard Worley
- George Lowther
- Edward Low
- John Evans
- John Phillips
- Francis Spriggs

Volume II features:

- James Misson (probably fictional)
- John Bowen
- William Kid
- Thomas Tew
- John Halsey
- Thomas White
- Christopher Condent
- Samuel Bellamy
- William Fly
- Thomas Howard
- William Lewis (probably fictional)
- John Cornelius (probably fictional)
- David Williams
- Samuel Burgess
- Nathaniel North

In addition Volume I also contains "An Abstract of the Civil Law and Statue Law now in France, in Relation to Pyracy." and Volume II contains "A Description of Magadoxa." and an appendix for Volume I

== Gallery ==
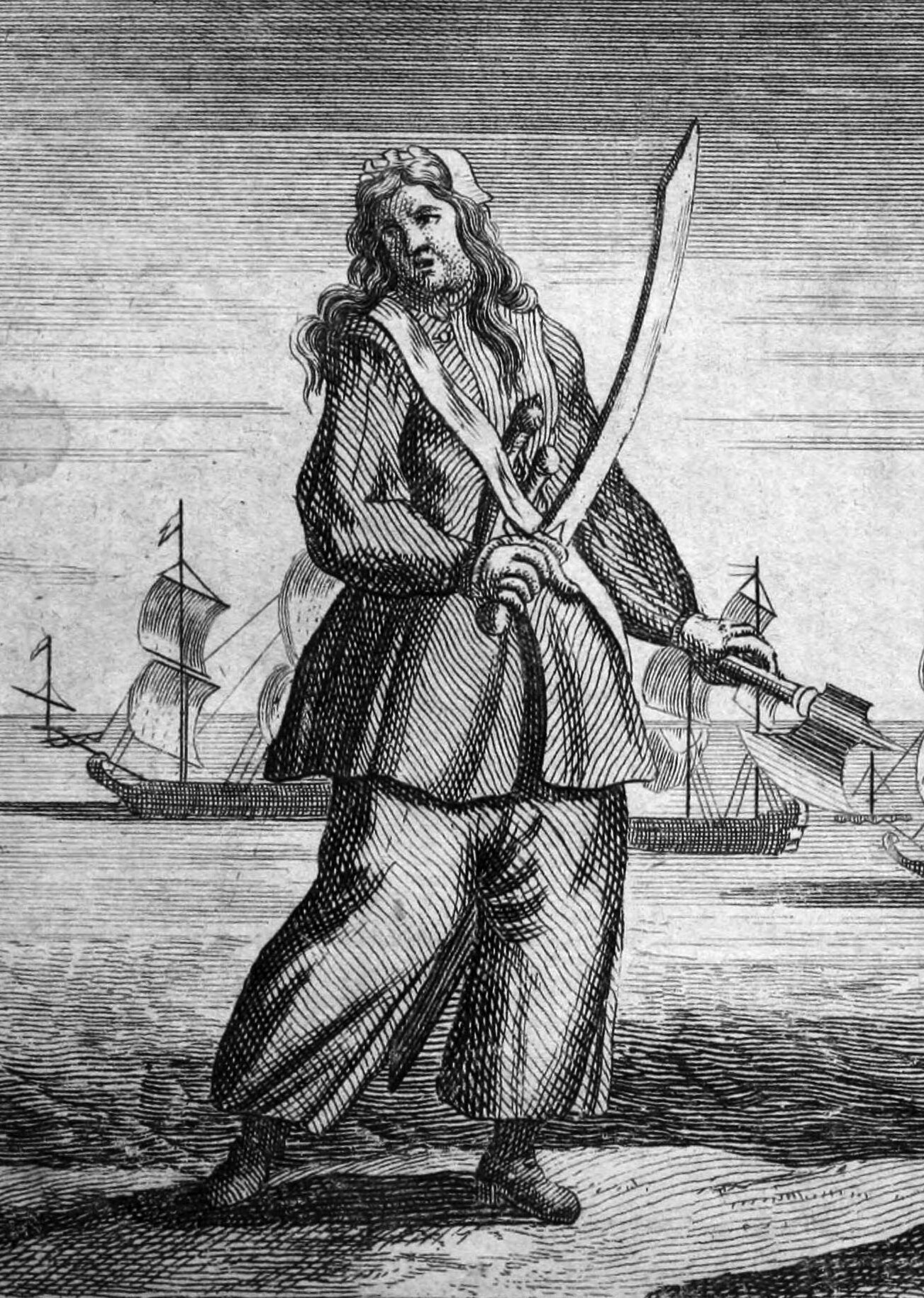
Engraving of Anne Bonny in the 1725 edition

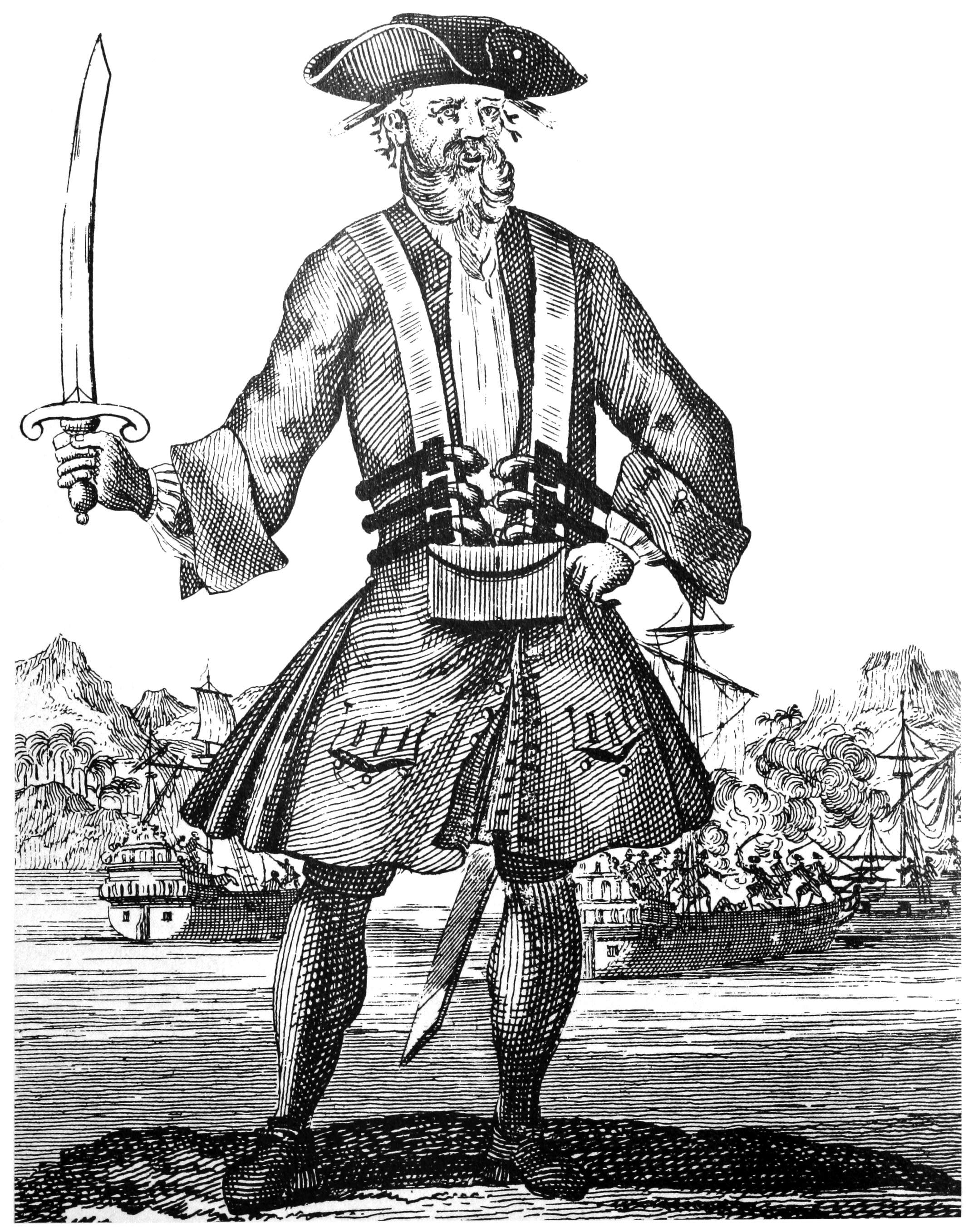
Edward Teach aka Blackbeard, as engraved by Benjamin Cole in the 1724 edition

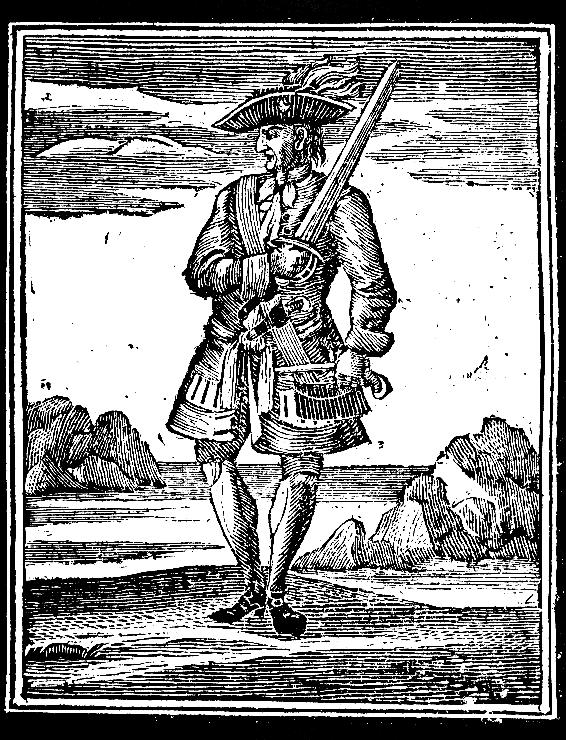
John Rackham in the 1725 edition

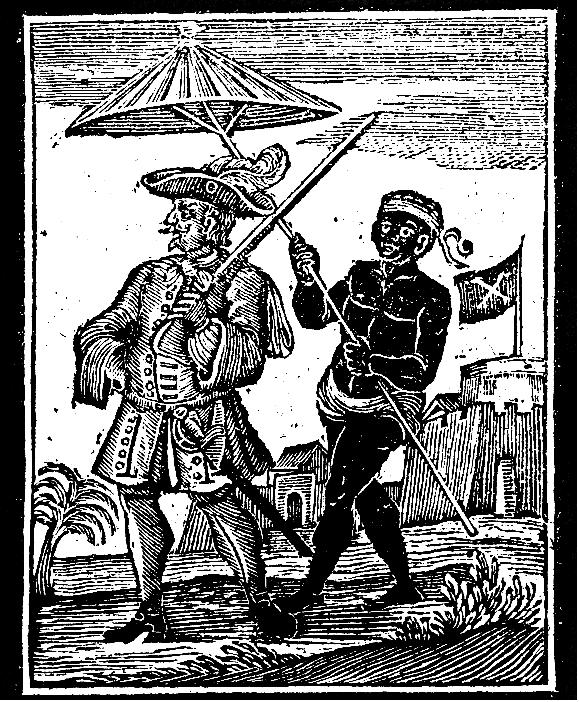
Henry Every in the 1725 edition

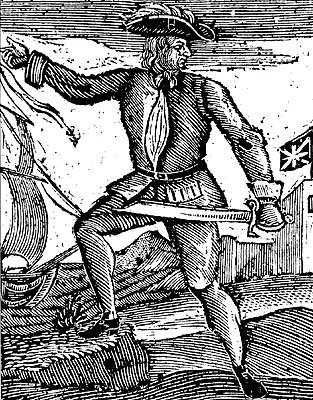
Howell Davis in the 1728 edition

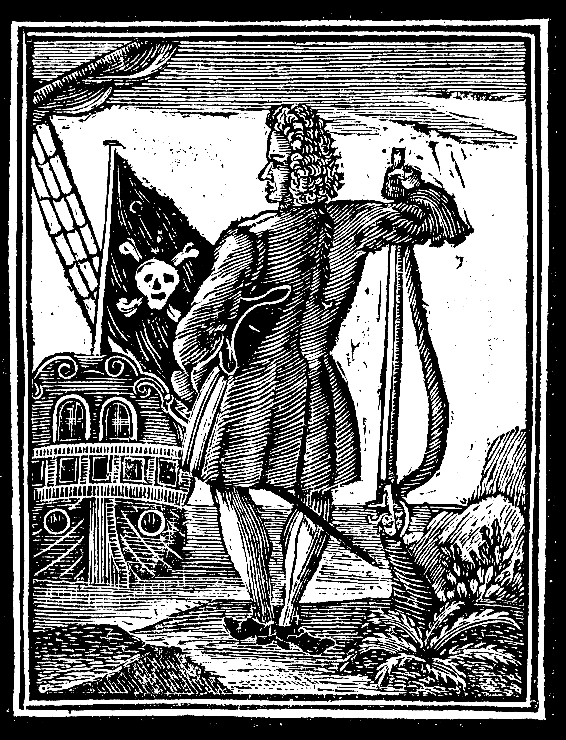
Stede Bonnet in the 1725 edition

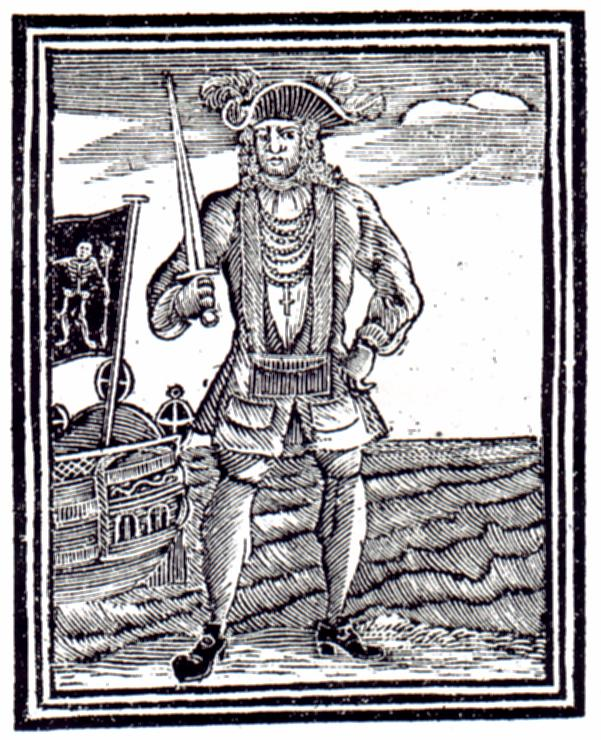
Bartholomew Roberts in the 1725 edition
