= 1704 in piracy =

See also 1703 in piracy, other events in 1704, 1705 in piracy, and Timeline of piracy.

== Events ==
=== Europe ===
- April 11 – Thomas Green, captain of the Worcester, and two of his officers were hanged in Leith, Scotland, for the piratical seizure of the Speedy Return. The crime had actually been committed by John Bowen and his crew.

=== North America ===
- June – Captain John Quelch is hanged for piracy in Boston, Massachusetts.
