= William Read (pirate) =

Pirate

William Read (died 1701, last name occasionally Reed) was a pirate active in the Indian Ocean near Madagascar. He is best known for rescuing fellow pirate captains John Bowen and Thomas White.

== History ==
Read was captain of Alexander, a 60-ton brigantine based out of Madagascar. Around 1701 he stopped near the settlement of a local native king. Thomas White and John Bowen had been aboard a French pirate ship which wrecked nearby and had been in the care of the king for over a year. The king was hospitable but insisted they leave on the first ship to arrive. Read took them aboard and proceeded around the Madagascar coast, picking up stranded European sailors to increase his crew. Bowen was elected sailing master and handled navigation for Alexander.

Now with 40 to 60 men they sailed to the Persian Gulf and took a 200-ton grab loaded with bale goods. Thinking the bales worthless, the pirates threw them overboard, not realizing the ship's crew had hidden their gold and valuables inside the bales. Read soon died of illness, replaced by a Captain James, who was himself replaced by Bowen after they had exchanged Alexander for the captured grab. Thomas White remained aboard until leaving to sail with Nathaniel North.

William Read of Alexander should not be confused with William Read of Ranger, a pirate who served under Captain Charles Harris until Harris was abandoned by Edward Low and captured by HMS Greyhound in 1723.

== See also ==
- George Booth (pirate), another prominent pirate linked to White, Bowen, and North (and possibly Read) in the same time period
