= 1703 in piracy =

See also 1702 in piracy, other events in 1703, 1704 in piracy, and Timeline of piracy.

== Events ==
=== Atlantic Ocean ===
- Undated – The crew of the Marblehead brigantine Charles mutinies, murders their captain, and elects John Quelch leader. Quelch's pirates then ransack Portuguese shipping off Brazil.

=== Indian Ocean ===
- March – East Indiaman Pembroke plundered by the pirate crews of Captain Howard and Captain Bowen, at Mayotte. Two merchant seamen are killed in the fight, and the Pembroke's Captain Woolley is forced into piracy.
- Spring – Summer – Captain Bowen in the Speedy Return captures a 700-ton Muslim ship off Surat, India, looting £22,000 in gold and capturing additional cargo which they sell in Malabar. Simultaneously, Captain Howard in the Prosperous takes another Muslim vessel close in to Surat, plundering 84,000 chequins.
