= 1705 in piracy =

See also 1704 in piracy, other events in 1705, 1706 in piracy, and Timeline of piracy.

== Events ==
=== Europe ===
- Undated - Money seized from Captain Kidd, executed only four years before, is presented by Queen Anne to Greenwich Hospital totaling £6,472.
- March – April - Captain Thomas Green and his crew, consisting of 14 officers and crew members, are tried by the High Court of the Admiralty and found guilty of piracy, robbery, and murder. Green is later hanged at Leith alongside four of his crew on April 4, with the remaining crew being hanged on April 11 and 18.

=== North America ===
- October - Boston colonial officials transport treasure formerly held by Captain John Quelch. The treasure consists of 788 oz. of gold bars and gold dust, which is packed into five sealed leather bags and carried by HMS Guernsey to Great Britain that same year.

== Deaths ==
=== Thomas Green's Crew ===
The members of Captain Thomas Green's crew executed between April 4 and April 18:

- April 4 - Thomas Green, captain (born c. 1679/1680)
- April 4 - John Madder, chief mate
- April 4 - James Simpson, gunner
- April 4 - Henry Keigle, carpenter
- April 4 - George Haines, ship steward
- April 11 - George Glen, seaman
- April 11 - Alexander Taylor, seaman
- April 11 - Andrew Robertson, gunner's mate
- April 11 - George Kitchen, seaman
- April 18 - James Burn, boatswain
- April 18 - John Bruckly, seaman
- April 18 - Samuel Wilcocks, surgeon's mate
- April 18 - John Bannantine, seaman
- April 18 - Thomas Linsteed, cargo assistant

=== Other ===
- Lionel Wafer, English buccaneer
