= John Martel =

John Martel may refer to:

- John Martel (pirate), English pirate
- John Martel, St Michael and All Angels Church, Llanfihangel Rogiet
- John Martel (novelist), American lawyer and novelist
