= Nathaniel North =

18th-century Bermudan pirate

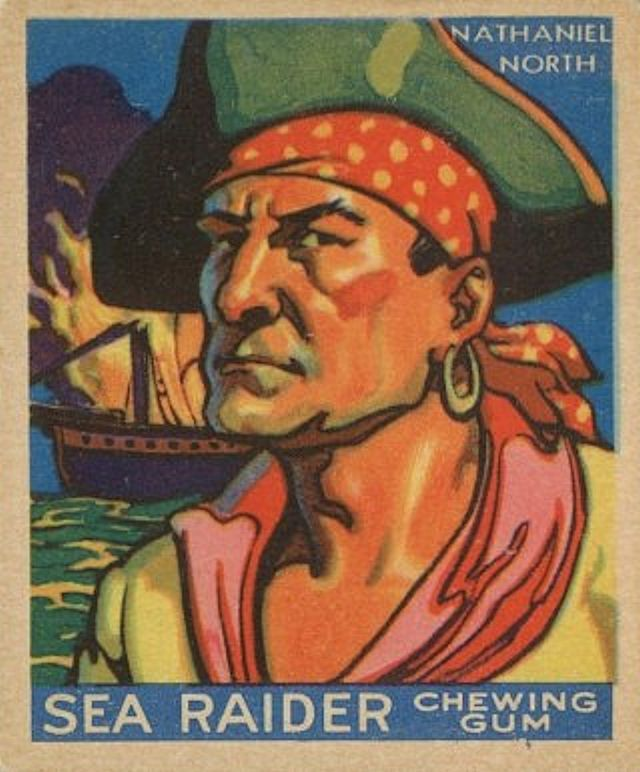
- Captain Nathaniel North, as depicted in the 1933 World Wide Gum Co. "Sea Raiders" trading card series
- Born: c. 1671; Bermuda
- Died: 1716; Madagascar
- Piratical career
- Type: Privateer, pirate
- Years active: c. 1689 – 1703/4, 1707–1716
- Rank: Quartermaster / Captain
- Base of operations: Atlantic Ocean, Red Sea, Indian Ocean
- Commands: Brigantine Defiant, frigate Charles
- Later work: Occasional slaver

Nathaniel North (c. 1671–1716) was a pirate during the Golden Age of Piracy, operating in the Indian Ocean under John Bowen and then as captain of the Defiant following Bowen's retirement in 1704. After losing the Defiant he ruled a pirate colony at Ambonaivo made up of his former crew before returning to sea. North reportedly retired with great wealth in 1709, settling in Madagascar and marrying a local woman, but was later murdered by her family.

== Early life ==
In 1689 North was a crewman aboard an English privateer attacking French shipping during the War of the Grand Alliance. He was impressed into the Royal Navy but made his way to Jamaica. There he again met British press gangs, but escaped by jumping overboard and swimming to shore. By 1696 North was a crewman in a band of privateers (which included future captain George Booth) who captured the 18-gun brigantine Pelican off Newfoundland. While the privateer under new captain Robert Colley obtained a commission to attack French holdings in West Africa, they instead travelled to Madagascar where they searched for ships based out of ports on the Arabian and Swahili coasts. When they failed to find any ships, the Pelican instead raided villages on the Comoro Islands.

Upon returning to Madagascar, North was elected quartermaster by the crew after Colley and a number of others died of illness; ship's cooper Joseph Wheeler was made captain. The Pelican then joined Dirk Chivers and Robert Culliford and the three ships together captured the Great Mohammed. Chivers and Culliford, however, refused to share the spoils from the Great Mohammed, claiming that the Pelican had not taken part in the battle. Following this event, the Pelican left the trio and later captured three small ships, keeping one and renaming her Dolphin. Damage caused to both ships in a hurricane forced a return to Madagascar, where the plunder was divided, with each of the pirates receiving around £700.

== Early career ==
In 1699, North served again as quartermaster under captain Samuel Inless, who had been given command of the Dolphin. After taking a large Danish ship they sailed to Île Sainte-Marie and divided the plunder with each man receiving around £400. While at the Île Sainte-Marie, however, four British warships under Commodore Thomas Warren arrived, forcing Inless to burn the Dolphin. While a pardon was offered to the pirates – several of whom accepted it – North instead fled in the ship's longboat, escaping to Madagascar.

In 1701, North turned to raiding settlements on land, leading a plundering expedition ashore in the Comoros Islands. His raiding party looted villages on Ngazidja and held the sultan of Mayotte for ransom before returning to sea.

== Later career and death ==
It was not until 1707 that North joined John Halsey as quartermaster on the brigantine Charles. During this period two British ships were captured, one of which Halsey took for himself and returned to Madagascar, leaving North in command of the Charles. This proved to be short-lived, as the Charles ran aground shortly after. North then returned to Madagascar and lived with the King of Maratan. In 1709 North returned to Ambonavoula where he traded with Mauritius and occasionally acquired slaves from Johanna. At some period after this, during a native conflict he was reportedly captured and later murdered by the opposing natives.

While some historians claim North never existed, as his story is mostly known from the factually questionable 1724 General History of the Pyrates, witness accounts do survive describing his piracy. A 1708 letter from the English settlement at Fort St. George, India describes how North lost the Charles, having "lost all his Anchors and Cables amongst the Maldiva Islands, and was obliged to run the Briggantine ashore at Maratan." The writer had been captured by the pirates and noted, "we had been very secure had either White lived, or North their Quartermaster been there."

== See also ==
- Robert Colley (pirate)
