= Proclamation for Suppressing of Pirates =

The Proclamation for Suppressing of Pirates may refer to:

- Either of the 1717–1718 Acts of Grace
- Other acts of grace (piracy)
