= 1700 in piracy =

See also 1699 in piracy, 1701 in piracy, and Timeline of piracy.

== Events ==
=== Africa ===
- July 18 - In the Cape Verde islands, Emanuel Wynn's pirate ship engages and escapes HMS Poole under Capt. John Cranby; this is the first recorded piratical use of the skull and crossbones flag.

=== Indian Ocean ===
- Undated - John Bowen's pirates cruise off Malabar and capture several ships including an East Indiaman. William Beavis in the East Indiaman Albemarle repulses a subsequent attack by Bowen's men. Bowen's ship, the Speaker, is wrecked later in the year.
