= Thomas White (pirate) =

English pirate (died 1708)

Thomas White (died 1708) was an English pirate active in the Caribbean and the Indian Ocean. He was only briefly a captain on his own, but served under several more prominent captains such as George Booth, John Bowen, Thomas Howard, John Halsey, and Nathaniel North.

== History ==
Originally a Royal Navy sailor, White made his way from Plymouth to Barbados where he captained the merchant trading vessel Marigold. Off of Guinea in 1698 his ship was captured by French pirates. They killed a number of English crewmen but a sympathetic French pirate spared him. The French pirates kept the Marigold and burned their own ship, then burned the Marigold when they took another vessel.

Some sources say the French pirates had been captured by John Bowen and George Booth. White refused to join them as a pirate and they made him a slave instead. White escaped when Booth and Bowen wrecked their ship near Madagascar in 1701. After a number of adventures in captured ships, he then signed on as quartermaster with Thomas Howard’s ship Prosperous until Howard shared out the voyage’s loot and retired in 1703.

Other sources say Booth and Bowen were aboard the ship but the French were still in control when the drunken French sailors wrecked the ship in 1701. White escaped, cared for by a local chieftain whose tribesmen killed the French pirates who came ashore. When pirate William Read stopped by, White joined him willingly. Read died at sea, replaced by a Captain James, and after trading their vessel for a captured prize ship near Mayotte they took several vessels before returning to port.

White then sailed with Nathaniel North. When White and thirty of the crew went ashore on Madagascar to resupply, North sailed away without them. White and his men located an abandoned ship in 1704 and sailed it into the Red Sea, plundering several vessels. They continued through August 1706, capturing British ships, and divided their plunder.

He briefly settled on Madagascar and married a native, but in 1707 signed on as quartermaster to John Halsey. White retired to Madagascar when Halsey returned there in 1708, where White died that March of illness and alcoholism. At his funeral he was buried with much ceremony. In his will he asked that his son be returned to England for his education, which was done.

== See also ==
- Pirate Round – the voyage from America and the West Indies to Africa, around the Cape of Good Hope, to Madagascar and then into the Indian Ocean
