= 1702 in piracy =

See also 1701 in piracy, other events in 1702, 1703 in piracy, and Timeline of piracy.

== Events ==
=== Indian Ocean ===
- Winter - John Bowen's pirates seize the ship Speedy Return, commanded by Captain Drummond, at Maritan in Madagascar.
