= 1706 in piracy =

== Events ==
- A small squadron of five sailing ships belonging to the Knights of Malta successfully capture a 46-gun Turkish ship carrying over 300 slaves. This is the first major offensive naval operation undertaken by the fleet since its formation in 1701, and escorting convoys since the beginning of 1705.
- The centuries-old privateering base of Dunkirk closes. As a result, the replacement rate of ships drops dramatically.
- John Halsey, commanding the Charles, begins raiding shipping in the Indian Ocean. He is the first American privateer to visit the Red Sea since the 1690s.
- Pierre Le Moyne d'Iberville, in the midst of the War of the Spanish Succession, leads an attack invading the English colony at Nevis. Approximately 1,100 buccaneers were among his forces.
- Local pirates are enlisted by colonial authorities to help defend Charlestown, South Carolina from the Spanish under the command of a French admiral. They are led by Lieutenant Colonel William Rhett who sail out to meet the Spanish fleet, four warships and a galley, and chases them from the area. Several days later, Rhett took several pirates with him to capture a large ship from the enemy fleet.
- Mary Read, disguising herself as a man, enlists in the Royal Navy.
- Between 1,200-1,300 French privateers occupy Martinique, one of the last old buccaneering hideouts, which they use to raid English and colonial American shipping.
- October - New Providence, a longtime pirate haven during the Buccaneering era, is abandoned after a Spanish raid destroys the church-fortress scattering Governor Nicholas Trott small settlement. This attack, along with a previous joint French-Spanish raid in 1703, effectively ends the colony as a base for English privateers.

== Deaths ==
- May 23 - William Kidd, Scottish privateer
