= Joseph Bradish =

American pirate

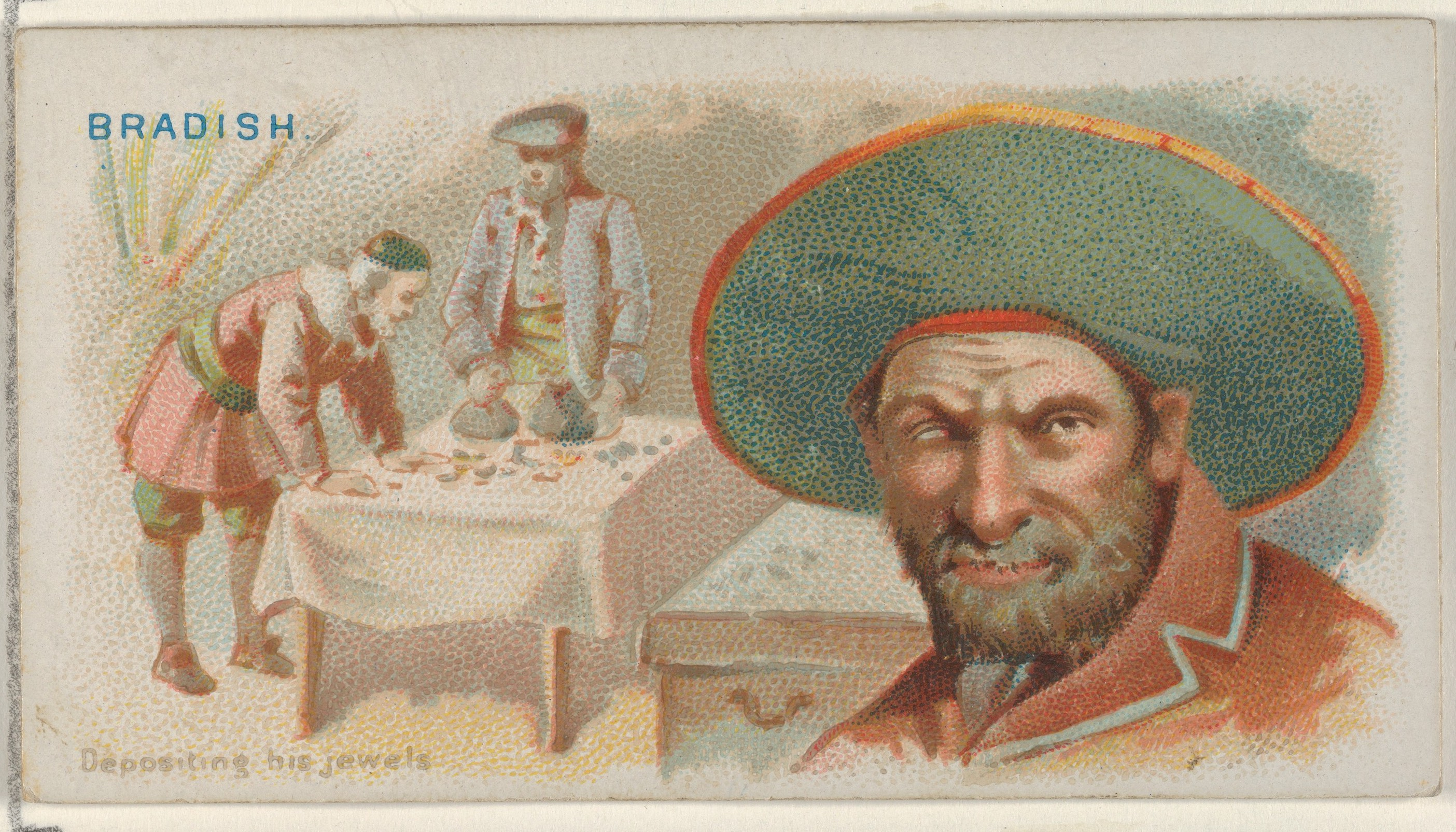
Joseph Bradish, Depositing His Jewels, from the Pirates of the Spanish Main series (N19) for Allen & Ginter Cigarettes MET DP835037

Joseph Bradish (1672–1700) was a pirate best known for a single incident involving a mutiny.

== History ==
Joseph Bradish was born in Sudbury, Massachusetts, on 28 November 1672. His parents, Joseph Bradish and Mary Frost Bradish, were children of English settlers who had arrived in Massachusetts in the 1630s.

Bradish signed on as a mate with the Borneo-bound 300-ton pink Adventure out of London in March 1698. Adventure's captain, Thomas Gullock, was much disliked and Bradish organized a mutiny against him. When Gullock and some officers went ashore in the Spice Islands, Bradish's men cut the anchor cables, put anyone who would not follow them off in a small boat, and stole the ship. Bradish was elected captain and shared the ship's treasure with his men. They sailed to Mauritius and Ascension to resupply and then headed to America.

They arrived off Nassau Island in March 1699. There they hired local sloops to offload their cargo, after which they scuttled Adventure. Most of the crew dispersed on horseback. Bradish and a few others convinced a local officer, Colonel Pierson, to stash several bags of jewels and coins before heading to Boston. They had hoped to obtain a pardon under the 1698 Act of Grace, which offered a pardon to pirates who willingly surrendered.

Massachusetts authorities were ready for them, arresting Bradish and his men. He was kept in the same jail which had held William Kidd until recently. In June Bradish escaped with the help of the jailer, a relative of his. He was recaptured in October north of Saco, Maine after New York's Governor Bellomont offered a reward for his capture. Meanwhile Bellomont arranged for the recovery of Bradish's treasure, which Bradish and his men had secreted across New England with Pierson and others.

Bellomont complained that he had no authority to put pirates to death, so Bradish was sent to England in March 1700 aboard HMS Advice, along with fellow prisoners Kidd and James Gilliam and many of Kidd's former crew. Bradish was tried, convicted, and hanged, gibbeted along with Kidd as a warning to other pirates.

As late as 1720, his name was known to pirates. Sailors captured by Bartholomew Roberts reported that Roberts' men refused to believe offers of amnesty, saying, "they would have no dealings with Acts of Grace, by which to be sent to hang a-sundrying at Hope Point as were the companies of Kidd and Bradish, trepanned under lying promises."

== See also ==
- Thomas Tew – Bellomont wrote that he suspected some of Bradish's crew had sailed with Tew and other pirates commissioned by his corrupt predecessor, deposed Governor Benjamin Fletcher.
