= John Evans (pirate) =

Welsh pirate

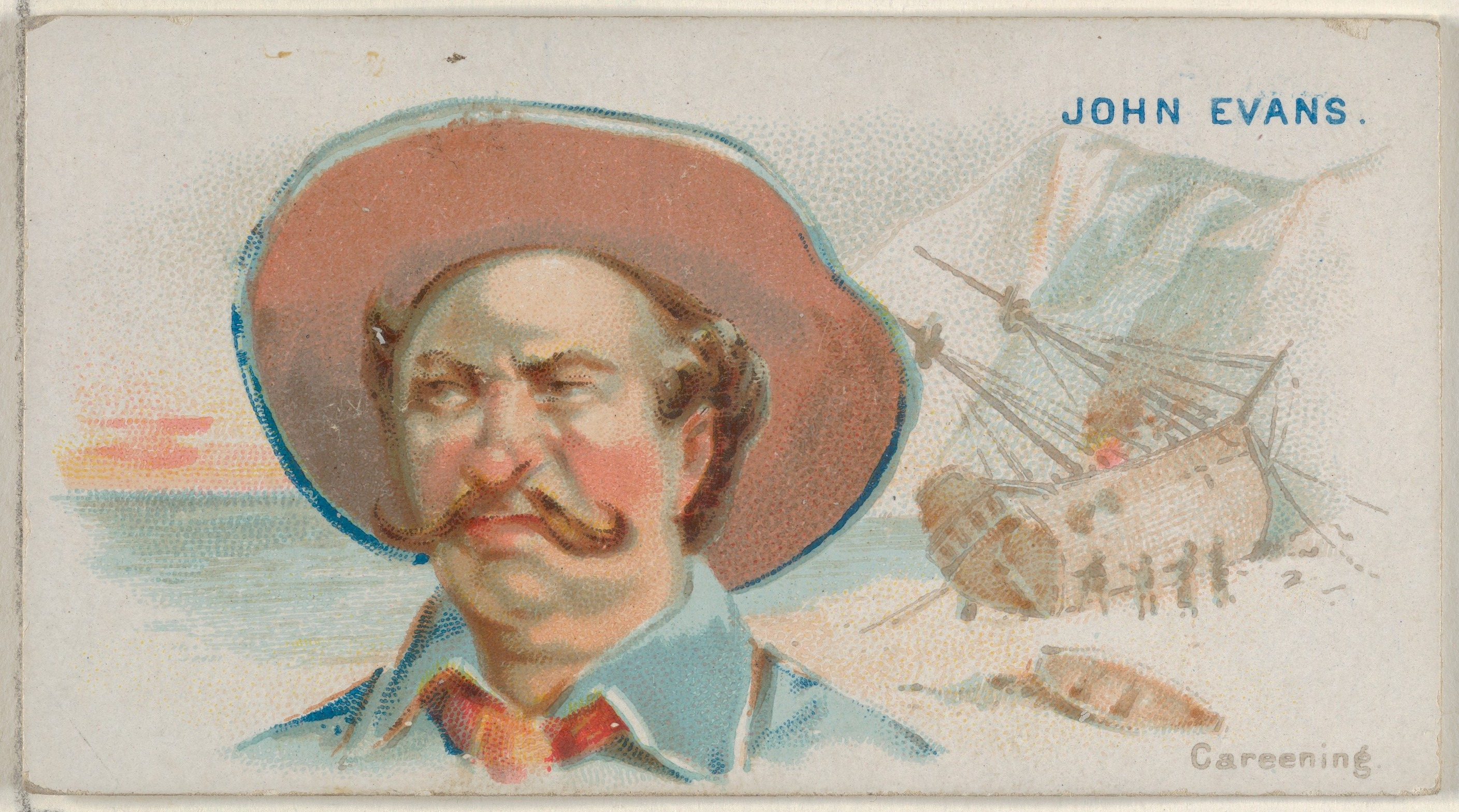
- John Evans, Careening, from the Pirates of the Spanish Main series (N19) for Allen & Ginter Cigarettes MET DP835003
- Born: Wales
- Died: 1723; Grand Cayman Islands
- Cause of death: Shot
- Occupation: Pirate
- Known for: Short but successful career
- Piratical career
- Base of operations: Caribbean
- Commands: Scowerer

John Evans (died 1723) was a Welsh pirate who had a short but successful career in the Caribbean.

== History ==
Evans worked as a ship's mate for vessels operating out of Jamaica after losing his position aboard a Nevis-based sloop. With little work to be had, he and a few others from Port Royal conspired in September 1722 to row around the island in a canoe, robbing houses at night. Tiring of simple robbery, they located a Bermudan sloop, rowed out to it, and Evans announced “that he was Captain of the Vessel, which was a Piece of News they knew not before.” The pirates celebrated at a local tavern and spent so liberally they were invited back; instead the pirates returned at night and looted the tavern before returning to sea.

Sailing their four-gun sloop (now renamed “Scowerer”) to Hispaniola, they soon captured a Spanish sloop. Because their crew was so small, Evans and his men shared out loot of £150 per man. They captured another vessel near the Windward Islands, forcing several sailors to join their crew before releasing the ship. Taking yet another prize called Lucretia and Catherine in January 1723, they kept it and left to careen the Scowerer. The slow Lucretia kept them from chasing other ships, so after capturing a faster Dutch sloop, they kept it instead and released the Lucretia.

They soon left for the Cayman Islands to careen, looting another vessel along the way. When then they arrived their argumentative boatswain challenged Evans to a duel. Evans accepted; when the boatswain backed out of the duel, Evans beat him with a cane. The boatswain then drew a pistol and shot Evans in the head. The other crewmembers in turn killed the boatswain. They had earlier forced the Lucretia’s navigator to join them; when he refused to pilot their ship any further, the crew broke up. The pirates went ashore on the Caymans, dividing their collected treasure of £9000 between 30 men. They left the Scowerer with the Lucretia's mate, who sailed it back to Port Royal.

== See also ==
- War of the Quadruple Alliance - the end of the War in 1720 put many privateers and Royal Navy sailors out of work, leaving them in the same condition which tempted Evans into piracy.
