= George Booth (pirate) =

English pirate

- Born: England
- Died: 1701; Zanzibar
- Piratical career
- Type: Pirate
- Years active: 1696–1701
- Base of operations: Indian Ocean, Red Sea
- Commands: Speaker

George Booth (died 1701) was an English pirate who was active in the Indian Ocean and the Red Sea. Counted among his crew were several pirates who would later become prominent captains including Nathaniel North, Thomas Howard and Booth's eventual successor, John Bowen.

== History ==
He is first recorded as a gunner aboard the Pelican under captain Robert Colley about 1696, and later on the Dolphin under captain Samuel Inless, both operating in the Indian Ocean. While he was a gunner on the Dolphin, it and several other pirate vessels were trapped at St. Mary's Island by a British fleet in September 1699. The crewmen were offered a pardon by the British commander, Thomas Warren. Some of the pirates such as Robert Culliford accepted the offer, but Booth, North, and others escaped after burning the Dolphin. They captured a French merchant ship by pretending to be merchants, asking to trade liquor and other goods for slaves. Booth was elected their captain, and the pirates sailed to Madagascar.

Booth encountered fellow British pirate John Bowen, and joining forces, they captured the 450-ton 50-gun slave ship Speaker near Majunga in April 1700. Booth gave this letter to Thomas Eastlake, now-former Captain of Speaker:

"These presents are to certify to all Governors, Captains or whom else it may concern, that the ship Speaker, was taken by us, and considering their misfortune we have given her Captain and Company, a vessel to transport them to any place they think fit. Given under our hands at Masselege, in Madagascar, this 18th day of April 1700. Signed, George Booth, John Ap Owen [Bowen] Cornelius George, X, His mark."

Now elected captain of the 54-gun Speaker, Booth sailed towards Zanzibar in late 1700. In early 1701 he stopped to rescue pirate Thomas Howard; Howard had been a member of John James’ crew, marooned when James’ ship was wrecked after rounding the Cape of Good Hope. Tom Collins, who later sailed with Howard, also joined Booth's crew, while Samuel Herault was elected quartermaster. While going ashore at Zanzibar for provisions, Booth and Bowen were attacked by Arab troops and Booth was killed in the fighting. After the death of Booth, Bowen was voted by the crew to replace Booth as captain of the small fleet.

== See also ==
- Thomas White (pirate) and David Williams (pirate) - two more of Booth's crewmen who later became captains
