= Joseph Wheeler (pirate) =

Joseph Wheeler (fl. 1696-1698) was a pirate active in the Indian Ocean and Red Sea. He is best known for sailing alongside Dirk Chivers and Robert Culliford.

== History ==
In 1696 Robert Colley took over captaincy of the 18-gun Pelican from the late Captain Lovering in Rhode Island. Ignoring his commission to return to Jamaica, he sailed for Madagascar to attack Moorish ships in the Red Sea. Aboard were Nathaniel North and Joseph Wheeler. After cruising against the Moors, Colley returned to Ile Saint Marie in early 1698 to divide their plunder; Wheeler's share amounted to over two thousand pieces of eight. While ashore Colley and thirty of the crew fell ill and died. The remaining crew couldn’t return to sea because the Pelican’s water barrels were all rotten. Wheeler was the ship’s cooper (barrel-maker and carpenter); with the help of local natives he repaired the ship’s water casks, and the grateful crew in return elected him Captain. North was chosen as the ship’s quartermaster.

At Madagascar they took aboard additional crew, now totalling over 100 men, and agreed on division of shares. Sailing to the Red Sea in August, they encountered Ralph Stout’s former ship Mocha, now under command of Culliford, alongside Dirk Chivers’ Soldados. The three captains agreed to sail together and split any prizes taken. Wheeler lent Culliford water and crewmen, plus wood to repair the Mocha. In September they located the treasure ship Great Mohammed transporting Turkish pilgrims. Chivers and Culliford attacked and looted it in what would become on one of the richest prizes ever taken by pirates. The Pelican was a slower ship, and though Wheeler fired cannons at the Great Mohammed, the others refused to share the plunder. They gave Wheeler a little money and some water and the Pelican departed.

The Pelican found and chased another large ship, which escaped after a long running battle. The enraged and disheartened crew sailed to Malabar, where they captured three ships. They looted two and released them, keeping the third and renaming it Dolphin, and disposing of the Pelican. A member of Chivers' crew later testified about Wheeler's ship: "There is a pirate ship out of the coast of India, who came from Rhode Island or Long Island in America, which is a leaky ship under the command of a certain person who was cooper of her. She is a very bad sailer, has 70 or 80 men, about 14 or 16 guns and called the Pelican." After repairing damage to their masts sustained in a hurricane, they put into Madagascar again. Culliford and Chivers were there with the captured Great Mohammed, along with Samuel Burgess, who was on a trading run from New York. Wheeler and several crewmen left the Dolphin and returned to New York with Burgess. Nathaniel North and the remaining crew returned to piracy in the Dolphin, electing Samuel Inless as captain. Wheeler was arrested and tried for piracy but was ultimately acquitted.

== See also ==
- Giles Shelley, pirate trader like Burgess who brought other members of Chivers' and Culliford's crews back to New England.
