= John Martel (pirate) =

French pirate

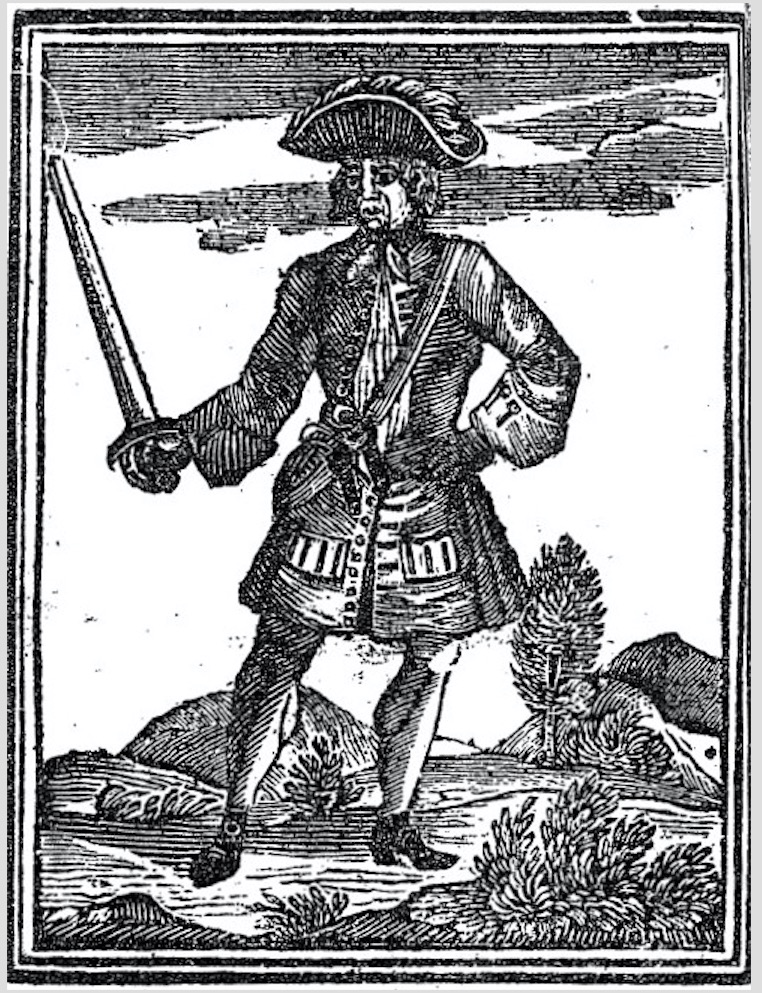
- Illustration of John Martel from Johnson's "A General History of the Pyrates", 1724.
- Other name: James or Jean
- Occupation: Pirate
- Years active: 1713-1718
- Piratical career
- Other names: Jean
- Base of operations: Caribbean
- Battles: War of Spanish Succession

John Martel (fl. 1713–1717, first name also Jean or James) was a pirate active in the Caribbean.

== Name and nationality ==
The majority of Martel's story appears in 1724's A General History of the Pyrates; he is called John Martel, and he and his crew are described as "some Privateer’s Men belonging to the Island of Jamaica," implying they were English. However, a report from the November 12, 1716 Boston News-Letter from a witness captured by Martel describes them as "Capt. John Martell a French Pyrate of 135 Men, being most of them French." Assuming he was French, his name would have been Jean Martel, and recent research has questioned several of the events and captures attributed to Martel. The history below largely reflects the narrative presented in A General History.

== History ==
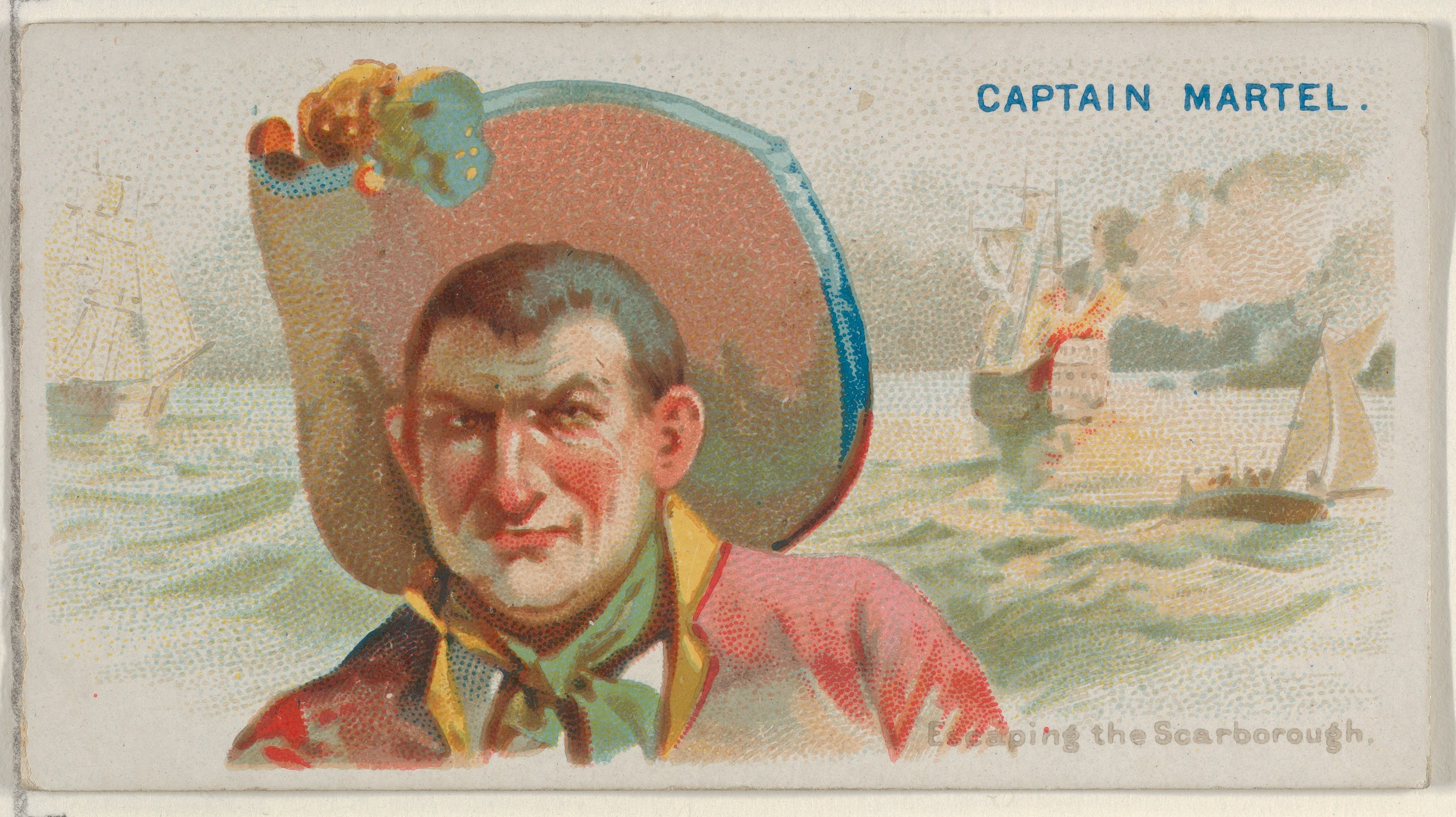
Captain Martel, Escaping the Scarborough, from the Pirates of the Spanish Main series (N19) for Allen & Ginter Cigarettes MET DP835012

Martel began his career as a privateer during the War of Spanish Succession, turning to piracy after the Treaty of Utrecht ended the war. By September 1713 he was active off Jamaica taking several ships with his 8-gun, 80-man sloop. He soon traded up to larger ships, keeping the best for his growing fleet. He forced a number of captured sailors to serve on his ships but let most of his captives go. At one point he swapped with the master of a captured ship, taking his vessel but giving him a prize ship in trade and setting him free.

With his new 22-gun, 100-man flagship and four other vessels he put into St. Croix in late 1716 to resupply and careen. Jamaican officials were tipped off to his location and dispatched the warship HMS Scarborough under Francis Hume to hunt him down. Hume found Martel's flotilla in January 1717. After sinking one of the pirate sloops and demolishing the shore batteries they had set up, Hume anchored offshore. Martel tried making a run for it in his flagship but ran aground in the attempt. He ordered the ship burned (with some captured slaves still aboard) and fled to a captured sloop, in which he and a few of his crew made their getaway. The remainder of his crew hid on the island as Hume looted and hauled away the remaining ships.

Later that month Samuel Bellamy and his partner Paulsgrave Williams put into St. Croix to repair and resupply when they were hailed by sailors from ashore. They were the remainder of Martel's crew and soon joined Bellamy, who sailed away before HMS Scarborough could return. Blackbeard is often cited as having fought Scarborough, though Royal Navy logs never mention such an incident; it is generally believed that later writers conflated Blackbeard's close encounter with HMS Seaford and Martel's fight against Scarborough.

Hume was rewarded for the action against Martel and others with command of the much larger warship HMS Bedford. Martel himself disappears after escaping Hume; some sources claim he accepted King George I's general pardon offered in late 1717 to all pirates who surrendered within a year.

== See also ==
- Stede Bonnet, who accompanied Blackbeard to St. Croix some time later.
- Lord Archibald Hamilton, Governor of Jamaica who dispatched Hume in Scarborough to hunt down pirates.
