= Canoot =

17th-century French pirate

Canoot (fl. 1698, real name unknown) was a French pirate active off the coast of New England. Governor William Markham of Pennsylvania described Canoot and his crew: "They are begarly rogues, and will pillage for a trifle."

== History ==
In early 1698 John Redwood of Philadelphia was sailing out of Maryland’s Sinepuxent Bay toward Cape May when he was attacked by Canoot and his pirates. They exchanged ships with Redwood, leaving him their slower vessel and taking his sloop. That September Canoot sailed to the waters off Sussex County, Delaware. Residents saw the sloop but were not alarmed, thinking him "little dreaded of being an enemy or French, both which they proved." The following day he stormed the town of Lewes with fifty men, plundering everything of value, including the residents’ clothes, leaving them "scarce anything in the place to cover or wear." Canoot’s pirates also stole all the town’s livestock and forced the inhabitants to help load their sloop. He then anchored offshore until he left to chase a passing ship. Canoot was equally violent to his own men, having "shott one of his owne men for some misdemeanor." This was not his first attack - “Many other crimes of similar nature were traced to Canoot and his pirate ship” - so local officials levied a tax to raise funds for coastal defense, though Canoot escaped.

== See also ==
- Louis Guittar – Another French pirate active off New England.
