= Careening Cove =

Bay in Sydney Harbour

Coordinates: 33.844992°S 151.216067°E

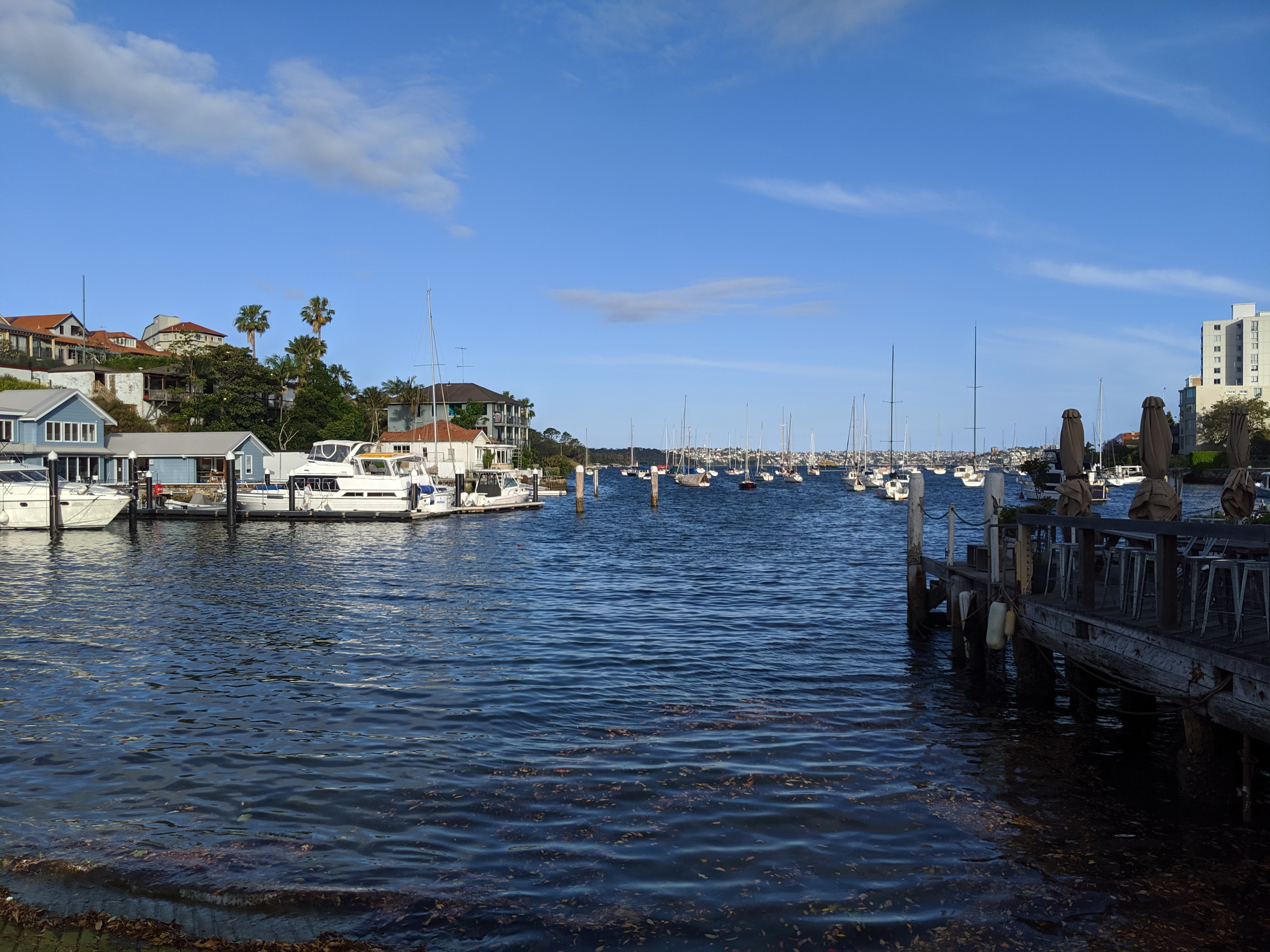
Careening Cove outlooking Sydney Harbour.

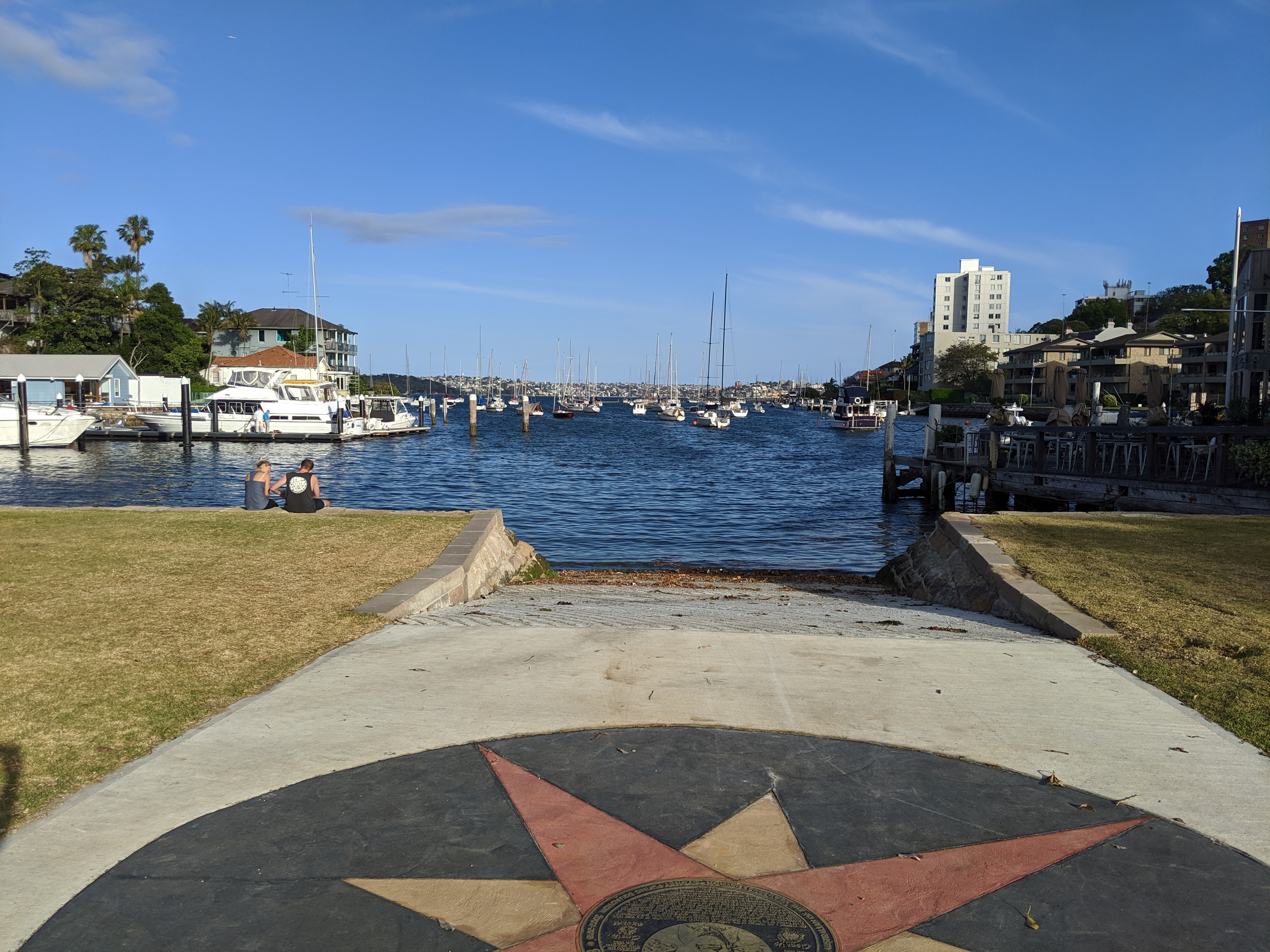
Boat ramp at Careening Cove.

Careening Cove, is a bay on the northern side of Sydney Harbour, near Milsons Point. The cove lies in the traditional lands of the Cammeraygal people, who called it Wia Wia. Its English name comes from the early days of European settlement in Australia, when the cove was used in careening - when a ship is tipped or rolled on its side to clean the keel and hull.
