= 1701 in piracy =

See also 1700 in piracy, other events in 1701, 1702 in piracy, and Timeline of piracy.

== Events ==
=== Europe ===
- May 23 - William Kidd is hanged for piracy and murder at Execution Dock in London.

=== Indian Ocean ===
- John Bowen's crew builds a pirate base at Maritan in Madagascar.

== Deaths ==
- May 23 - William Kidd, privateer and pirate (born c. 1645).
