= Louis Guittar =

18th-century French pirate

- Died: November 13, 1700; London
- Cause of death: Hanged
- Other name: Lewis
- Occupation: Pirate
- Years active: Late 1690s and early 18th century
- Criminal charge: Piracy
- Criminal penalty: Death
- Piratical career
- Base of operations: Caribbean, the West Indies, and New England
- Commands: La Paix

Louis Guittar (alternatively spelled Lewis Gittar, died 13 November 1700) was a French pirate active in the Caribbean, the West Indies, and New England during the late 1690s and 1700s.

== History ==
Based in St. Malo in the late 1690s, Guittar commanded the 28-gun sloop La Paix attacked merchant shipping in the Caribbean and Mid-Atlantic area.

In early 1700, after plundering and sinking five merchant ships in Chesapeake Bay, he was expecting only the elderly Essex Prize guardship, but was surprised to find instead the fifth-rate frigate HMS Shoreham under Captain William Passenger. The Shoreham had arrived in April 1700 in response to pirate John James looting a number of vessels in the area and forcing the outgunned Essex Prize to retreat. After Guittar chased the remaining merchantman into Lynnhaven Bay, Virginia on May 3, 1700, Virginia Governor General Francis Nicholson accompanied Passenger aboard the Shoreham, reportedly standing on the foredeck throughout the fight.

Although evenly matched, with Passenger's 115 crew and 28 guns to the Guittar's crew consisting of between 150 and 160 sailors and 20 mounted guns (with eight more in the hold), Guittar was forced to surrender after a 12-hour battle. Guittar threatened to blow up La Paix's powder magazine, killing almost 50 prisoners, if he didn't receive quarter and a pardon. Nicholson granted the pirates quarter but referred them to King William of England for trial. With 26 men killed, HMS Shoreham took on the surviving crew members, of which more than half were wounded. Transferred to England, Guittar and 23 of his crew were tried for piracy and hanged in London several months later.

== See also ==
- Canoot - another French pirate active off the New England coast.
