= John James (pirate) =

Welsh pirate (fl. 1699–1700)

- Occupation: Pirate
- Years active: 1699–1700
- Piratical career
- Base of operations: Madagascar, Nassau, and the American east coast

John James (fl. 1699–1700) was a Welsh pirate active near Madagascar, Nassau, and the American east coast.

== History ==
Nothing is known of James's early life. In 1699 he was a sailor aboard the American-owned 22-gun vessel Providence when it was captured near Barbados by a Dutch pirate named Hind (Hynde). James and other sailors then mutinied against Hind, recapturing the vessel and marooning Hind and his supporters near New Providence. James then turned to piracy, ordering for Providence to be sailed northward to plunder merchant traders along the coast. The vessel was renamed Alexander while en route, perhaps to disguise its origins.

In July 1699 James sailed into Lynnhaven Bay, Virginia. The bay was guarded by the 16-gun Essex Prize under Captain Aldred. The two ships exchanged cannon fire but Aldred retreated when it became clear the fight was wholly unequal. The fight against Essex and some of James' earlier captures were attributed to Hind until word spread of James having seized command. James himself was not averse to hiding his identity, telling the captain of one captured vessel that he was the pirate William Kidd. In order to throw pursuers off his trail, James also told the captain false stories about a sister ship he had in the area.

Virginia's Governor Francis Nicholson was furious that Essex Prize had been insufficient to deter pirates. When that ship needed to be careened and repaired, he warned officials in coastal counties to post lookouts and alert him if they spotted anything suspicious. In April 1700 the warship HMS Shoreham arrived to guard the coast, too late to catch James but in time to battle and defeat French pirate Louis Guittar, who had sailed into the area hoping to replicate James’ success.

James meantime had sailed for New York City, pillaging ships along the way. His success caused Governor Bellomont to order the 32-gun frigate HMS Arundel to chase down James, though James had by then left the area. James took his ship across the Atlantic to Guinea and toward Madagascar. He captured additional ships there, and may have sailed alongside George Booth for a time, but was later wrecked on a reef. Pirate Thomas Howard had been serving as James' quartermaster; he looted their stranded ship and its valuables before fleeing in a small boat, but James’ fate after this is not known.

== See also ==
- Thomas Day and John Breholt - Two other pirates Nicholson tried to capture.
