= Ambonaivo =

- Location in Madagascar
- Coordinates: 25°13′S 45°56′E
- Country: Madagascar
- Region: Androy
- District: Ambovombe
- Elevation: 171 m (561 ft)

Population (2018)
  - Total: 6,975
  - Ethnicities: Antandroy
- Time zone: UTC3 (EAT)
- postal code: 604

Ambonaivo is a town and commune in Madagascar. It belongs to the district of Ambovombe, which is a part of Androy Region. The population of the commune was estimated to be 6975 in 2018. It is situated 20 km west of Ambovombe.

Only primary schooling is available. Farming and raising livestock provides employment for 49% and 49% of the working population. The most important crops are sweet potatoes and peanuts, while other important agricultural products are maize, cassava and cowpeas. Services provide employment for 2% of the population.
