= Nathaniel Mist =

British printer and journalist

- Born: 1685
- Died: 30 September 1737 (aged 51–52)

Nathaniel Mist (died 30 September 1737) was an 18th-century British printer and journalist whose Mist's Weekly Journal was the central, most visible, and most explicit opposition newspaper to the whig administrations of Robert Walpole. Where other opposition papers would defer, Mist's would explicitly attack the government of Walpole and the entire House of Hanover. He was a Jacobite of strong convictions and pugnacious determination who employed various authors writing under pseudonyms and was frequently tried by the government for sedition.

His early years are obscure, and he first enters the public record and public eye as the owner of a successful printing press in 1716. As owner and master of the press, he began immediately to publish his own journals. His first effort, The Citizen, ran to only nine issues in 1716. His second effort was to take over Weekly Journal, or, Saturday's Post in December 1716. This would later, in May 1725, become Mist's Weekly Journal (the Weekly Journal published by Mist). In 1717, he attempted Wednesday's Journal, but that ran to only five issues, and The Entertainer in 1718 ran successfully to 38 issues before being taken over by another press. Mist's Weekly Journal, however, was an enormous success and reflected the editor's personal political vision.

Historians such as Arne Bialuschewski also proposed that Mist wrote under the pseudonym "Captain Charles Johnson" to create A General History of the Pyrates.

== Mist's Weekly Journal ==
Nathaniel Mist's paper was frequently prosecuted, as was its owner and editor, for libel, and yet it published successfully from 1716 to 1737 (without Mist himself for the last three years). Mist was able to stay in business, and at liberty, generally, by being very aware of the line between the allowable and the prohibited speech. He would discuss current scandals, literature, and events frankly, but when the subject was political or touching the affairs of the peerage, he would employ allegory or fictional history. He would print authors talking about lands far away, for example, but readers would understand that the land was actually England. He would have an account of a particular episode in history, such as the Restoration, and imply, of course, that the return of the Stuarts was appropriate. He would publish an account of famous regicides, where the king was a tyrant, and imply that the public needed to take action against the Hanoverian "usurper." Fictions of corrupt ministers would be commentaries on Robert Walpole. Informative stories about how pirates organize their ships would be an analogy to Walpole's running of the British House of Commons. Furthermore, as the government found out (and complained of in 1722), every time they arrested and tried Mist, the popularity of his Journal would increase. There is no way to know what Mist's average weekly circulation was, but it may have been around 8,000 - 10,000 copies a week (Chapman 379).

== Government responses ==
Nevertheless, the government did, indeed, worry about Nathaniel Mist, and they worried about him so much that they put Daniel Defoe in his employ to be his friend and spy on him, write for him, and persuade him away from the most damaging articles. In 1718, Daniel Defoe claimed that he had personally spiked stories that Mist would have published and that Mist was under his control. Although this was almost certainly an exaggeration, Defoe said later that he had got Mist out of jail on at least three occasions. When Defoe left off working with Mist entirely in 1724, he complained in Applebee's Journal that Mist had fought with him (physically) and insulted him, and in 1730 he complained that Mist had harmed his career (probably by revealing Defoe's acting as a government agent to other printers).

Among the various arrests and convictions of Nathaniel Mist for Mist's Weekly Journal were three in 1717 and two in 1718. In 1720, he was convicted by the House of Lords, and he was fined £50, spent three months in jail, and was sent to the pillory, where the crowds were gentle with him. He was also supposed to give surety (bond) to ensure seven years of good behaviour. Eleven months later, he called George I "a cruel ill-bred uneducated old Tyrant, and the drivelling Fool his Son" and was imprisoned for not revealing the author of the libel. In 1723 and 1724 he was tried and imprisoned for a year, after a £100 fine. Finally, in 1727 he was tried for a libel on George I himself, and he was ordered to be imprisoned until he could offer up a surety for a lifetime of good behaviour. This forced Mist to flee to France.

== In exile ==
From France, Nathaniel Mist continued to control Mist's Weekly Journal for a time. He joined the household of Philip Wharton, 1st Duke of Wharton, and in August 1728 (the same time as public disaffection over the ministry was peaking with the popularity of The Beggar's Opera in London), Mist's Weekly Journal published "The Persian Letter" by "Amos Drudge" (Wharton). It explained the corruption and loss of liberties in "Persia" after a usurpation. Over twenty people were arrested for this publication. Copies of the issue went for as much as half a guinea. In September 1728 another issue again made too explicit an attack on the Walpole ministry and the royal family, and so the presses were destroyed.

After the destruction of the presses, the journal was renamed Fog's Journal and passed over to the printing of Charles Molloy. Also in 1728, there were criticisms of Alexander Pope in issues of Mist's, and so Pope responded by citing Mist's Weekly Journal as a symptom of intellectual and political decline in The Dunciad.

Mist moved to Boulogne-sur-Mer in 1729 and began working for the Old Pretender. His function was to plant news stories in the English presses that might be favourable to the Jacobite cause and to set up a covert correspondence with Jacobites in England. In 1730 he set up a joint venture with Charles Molloy to ship wine from France to England, and to use these shipments as a way of passing secret messages. By 1734, however, he appears to have been out of favour among the exiled Jacobites, and in 1737 he received permission to return to England. He died in Boulogne in 1737, and his wife had to pawn his personal effects to pay customs duties on his last shipment of wine.

== See also ==
- Daniel Defoe
- Jonathan Swift
- Charles Johnson (writer)
