= Hendrick van Hoven =

- Died: 1699; Nassau
- Other name: Hendrygo van Goven
- Occupation: Buccaneer
- Years active: 1699
- Piratical career
- Nickname: “the grand pirate of the West Indies.”
- Other names: Hind
- Commands: Providence

Hendrick van Hoven (died 1699, also named Hendrygo van Goven, alias Hind, Hine, Hynd, or Hynde) was a Dutch buccaneer and pirate active in the Caribbean. He was known as “the grand pirate of the West Indies.”

== History ==
Van Hoven had been first mate aboard Thomas Mostyn's ship Fortune, seized for piracy in 1698. All records of Hendrick van Hoven’s own piracy take place in 1699, beginning in March when he used his brigantine to take a sloop. Another sloop captain reported a pirate robbing several ships near Tortuga in April; this was probably Van Hoven, as over the next month he was identified as robbing 18 more ships in the same area. With a wife and children in New York, he was often cited as “Hine of New York”; Governor Bellomont of New York described him as “a bloody villain, has murthered several men, and will give no quarter, they say, to Spaniards that he takes.”

Van Hoven captured the 22-gun ship Providence of pirate hunter William Rhett (who would go on to capture Stede Bonnet) in April 1699; Rhett made “a very generous defence, but was outdone and taken by the said Pirate.” Van Hoven’s crew was a mix of Dutch, French, English, and other sailors; the English under John James (who may have been with Van Hoven since 1697) staged a mutiny, seizing the Providence and marooning Van Hoven with several others a few miles from Nassau. James sailed north, and some reports of his activities mistakenly placed Van Hoven still in command of the Providence until word got out of James’ identity.

Captured by Bahamas Governor Read Elding, Van Hoven was put on trial in October 1699 with several of his crewmates; some of his men had been executed the previous month. He protested that he had only taken Spanish ships and quoted the Biblical trials of King David and Hezekiah before petitioning for a reprieve: “if it cannot be fifteen days, let it be ten; if it cannot be ten, let it be five … to help me save that dear jewel my soul.” His reprieve was denied and he was hanged in Nassau. Former members of his crew threatened Elding, promising to avenge their Captain. Reportedly Van Hoven mumbled about hidden treasure in the southern Bahamas before dying.

== See also ==
- Admiralty court, the venue in which Van Hoven was tried and convicted.
