= Thomas Howard (pirate) =

Pirate during the Golden Age of Piracy

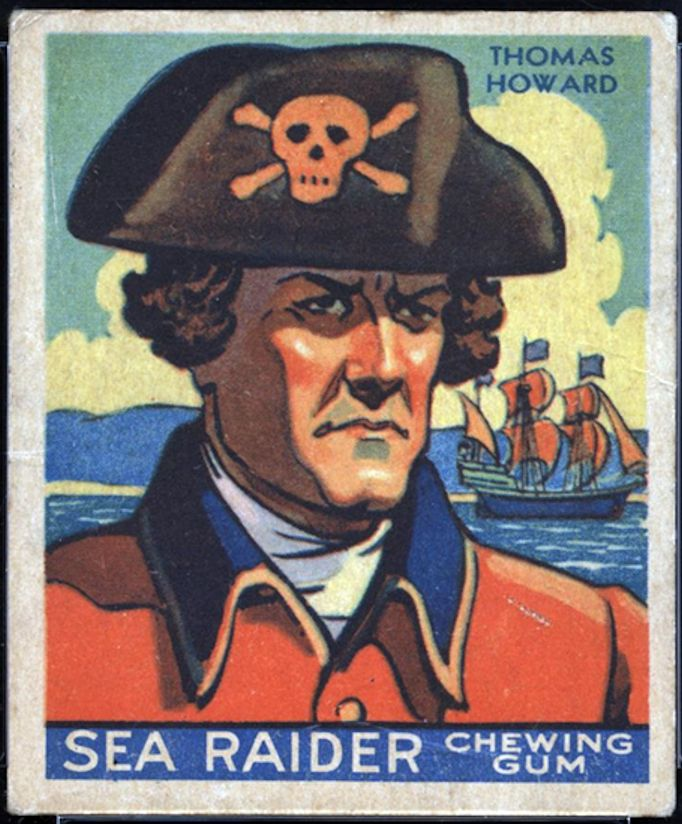
- Died: Rajapur, Maharashtra, India
- Piratical career
- Type: Pirate
- Years active: 1698–1703
- Base of operations: Atlantic Ocean, Indian Ocean, Red Sea
- Commands: Prosperous

Thomas Howard was a pirate primarily active in the Indian Ocean and the Red Sea during the Golden Age of Piracy. He served under other pirates of the time, including George Booth and John Bowen. He also commanded the 36-gun Prosperous. He later retired to Rajapur, in India, where he married a local woman. He was later murdered by her relatives.

== Early life ==
While little about his early life is known, Howard arrived in Jamaica at some time prior to 1698 after spending his entire inheritance. Howard began his career by, along with a small group of pirates, first stealing a canoe and then stealing further ships until they captured a 24-gun ship. Howard was elected quartermaster by the crew.

After attacking a number of ships off the east coast of North America during 1698, the ship crossed the Atlantic Ocean and began raiding the West Coast of Africa in 1699. Howard and the crew took a large prize from the Alexander of pirate John James which had run aground on a reef off Madagascar. Shortly after this, Howard was marooned by the crew while hunting and was not rescued until George Booth arrived in early 1701. Serving alongside John Bowen aboard the Speaker, Howard remained with the crew following Booth's death and Bowen's subsequent election as captain. Following the loss of the Speaker after grounding on St. Augustine's Reef, Howard settled on the nearby island of Mauritius.

== As captain of the Prosperous ==
After a short period of time he recruited a group of pirates and took the 36-gun Prosperous. Howard was elected captain at Christmas 1702 and again met with John Bowen, at the port of Mayotta. Together, the two attacked the East Indiaman Pembroke in March 1703, off Johanna Island in the Comoros Islands. Howard left Bowen for a period of time while Bowen's ship Speedy Return was being careened. Briefly putting in to Madagascar, Howard's men visited with Aert Van Tuyl ("Ort Van Tyle"), an ex-pirate who owned an inland plantation. When they heard that Van Tuyl had earlier attacked some fellow pirates (possibly Thomas Mostyn), they fought with Van Tuyl and his native allies. Howard's men escaped but were forced to leave David Williams and Tom Collins behind, whom Van Tuyl kept as slaves until their escape some months later. Howard and Bowen cooperated again in August 1703 where they attacked and took two Indian ships, with a combined value of £70,000. The two crews were merged aboard the larger of the Indian ships – a 56-gun ship renamed the Defiant – with Bowen in command. Returning to Rajapura, the crew divided the takings.

== Retirement and death ==
Having received his share of the prize, Howard remained in Rajapura when Bowen left with the Dauntless. Retiring from piracy, he married a local woman. However, after a short period of time his ill-treatment of her led to his being murdered by the relatives of his wife. Captain Charles Johnson – commonly considered to be a pseudonym of Daniel Defoe – wrote about this event in A General History of the Pyrates, saying that he was "a most ill natur'd Fellow, and using her ill, he was murder'd by her Relations".
