= Robert Colley (pirate) =

English pirate and privateer

Robert Colley (Note: Last name occasionally spelled Colly or Coley.) (died 1698) was an English pirate and privateer active near Newfoundland and the Indian Ocean.

== History ==
Around 1695 Jamaican-born privateer Captain Lovering and ship's master Robert Colley (along with future pirate captains Nathaniel North and George Booth) cruised off Newfoundland in the 10-gun Barca-longa Servilian, having been unsuccessful finding French targets in the West Indies. There they captured three French ships, including the 75-man, 18-gun Pelican.

In early 1696 they sailed to Newport, Rhode Island, where they had two of their prizes confirmed and sold off. The Pelican's owners disputed their claim but Colley hired the Deputy Customs Collector, Robert Gardiner, to secure their claim, clear them to leave port, and act as their lawyer. They dismantled the barca-longa and refitted the Pelican, which Colley took command of after Lovering died. (Note: At least one source says Pelican had instead been brought in by privateer Peter Lawrence, though with Colley eventually obtaining command in any event.) Governor Walter Clarke issued them a commission, ostensibly to return captured sailors to Jamaica and engage in privateering en route.

Some of the stranded sailors refused to accompany Colley; it was common knowledge that he had no intention of returning to Jamaica, but instead wanted "to cruise on the Moors, not intending to Pirate among the Europeans, but honestly and quietly to rob what Moors be in their way." Clarke and Gardiner were later called to testify over their actions, having been involved with granting privateering commissions to and doing business with a number of known pirates such as Colley, Thomas Tew, Joseph Faro, and William May.

The Pelican immediately sailed for Madagascar via the Cape of Good Hope. They debated raiding the South African coast, which Colley refused, having little knowledge of the area. Instead, they raided Mayotte and captured the King, ransoming him for silver and supplies and taking slaves. Having plundered two other ships, they returned to Île Sainte-Marie to careen and divide their plunder. Sources differ regarding Colley's fate. Johnson claims that while at Madagascar, in May 1698 disease overtook the crew; they put ashore to rest but Colley and many of the crew subsequently died. The ship's cooper Joseph Wheeler was made Captain while North was promoted to the quartermaster of the Pelican, which they sailed for the Red Sea. Other sources indicate that Colley may have returned to New England and retired: by late 1699 Colley was among several former pirates and privateers (including Thomas Paine) who petitioned for a parish of the Church of England to be created in Rhode Island.

== See also ==
- Adam Baldridge, an ex-pirate who ran a flourishing pirate trading port on Île Sainte-Marie.
