= Samuel Burgess =

English pirate (died 1716)

- Born: c. 1650; New York City
- Died: 1716 (aged 65–66); Madagascar
- Piratical career
- Type: Privateer, later Pirate
- Allegiance: None
- Years active: 1690 – 1716
- Base of operations: various, later Madagascar
- Commands: Margaret (captain), Neptune (quartermaster)

Captain Samuel Burgess was a member of Captain William Kidd's crew in 1690 when the Blessed William was seized by Robert Culliford and some of the crew, with William May named as captain.

In 1693, Edward Coates became captain and the former Captain Burgess left the ship and went to New York City. He arrived in April, bought a house and took on a job with Frederick Philipse, New York's wealthiest merchant. Over the next few years Burgess made many profitable voyages to Madagascar selling supplies and guns to pirates in exchange for gold and slaves.

Around September 1699, Burgess was in command of the Margaret. Near Saint Mary's Island he ran into a British squadron under Thomas Warren. Pirates there (including Dirk Chivers) accepted an offer of pardon for any piratical activities from Warren, and about 20 of them bought passage home on the Margaret. Burgess sailed to Cape Town, South Africa; by December he reached his destination. Captain Lowth of the East India Company, seized Burgess' ship and took it to Bombay. Lowth also took its treasure and slaves. The owners of the Margaret brought suit against the East India Company and Burgess was taken to London around 1701 and accused of piracy. With Captain Robert Culliford's testimony, Burgess was convicted. Eventually he secured a pardon for his crimes and signed aboard a privateer, sailing for the Pacific.

Burgess then became first mate aboard the Neptune and went to Madagascar to trade liquor for slaves. When a sudden storm wrecked the pirates' ships, Burgess helped John Halsey seize the Neptune. Burgess was made Quartermaster but lost it soon after, when Captain Halsey died in 1708. After losing his position, Burgess stayed at Madagascar, dealing in slaves with David Williams. Supposedly, following an argument concerning prices with a black chief, Burgess died of poison, presumably at the chief's hand.
