= Thomas Green (captain) =

Thomas Green (1679/1680[?]–1705) was an English sailor and alleged pirate, who was captain of the Worcester. He was hanged on Leith sands in Scotland along with two of his crew on 11 April 1705.

Green was celebrated in a contemporary ballad:

Of all the pirates I’ve heard and seen
The basest and the bloodiest is Captain Green

The Worcester was seized, probably at the behest of the Secretary of the Company of Scotland (Roderick Mackenzie), when she came into the Firth of Forth simply to weather a storm. Green and his crew were alleged to have boarded a ship, the ironically named Speedy Return, off the Malabar coast in India, killed the crew and its captain Robert Drummond, stolen the goods on board, then sold the ship.

However, the evidence against Green has been considered flimsy; during the trial, the ship in question was never named, and neither the ship's owner nor any next of kin of the alleged deceased came forward. Furthermore, the exact time and place of the incident were never specified ("upon one or other Days of the Months of February, March, April or May, in the year 1703").

As the alleged incident was outside Scottish waters, the veracity of the trial was also called into question; however the prosecution argued that the subjects of the piracy had, according to different witnesses, either sailed under an English flag or had spoken English, and as such, Green and his crew were subject to the justice of Admiralty. To further dispel any pretence of a fair trial, many of the crew were forbidden to provide evidence, and one of those who was allowed—the captain's Indian servant—had, for poor behavior, been "chained and nailed to the Floor of the Fore-Castle" at the time of the alleged incident;" despite this, his evidence was accepted. The English historian G. M. Trevelyan complained that while "the 'evidence' did not even pretend to be more than hearsay [...] the court [was] drunk with patriotic prejudice."

Green was sentenced to death, originally intended for the 3 April 1705, but this was postponed for a time at the request of the Queen's Privy Council. During this time it became known to those involved in the trial that survivors of the Speedy Return had arrived back in England, and were ready to testify that it had instead been captured by pirate John Bowen, confirming the innocence of Green and his colleagues. Nevertheless, the Crown's Scottish representatives failed to stand up to an angry Edinburgh mob, and did not postpone the execution date further.

Green and two of his crew members, Simpson, an Englishman, and John Madder, a Scot, were found guilty and hanged on Leith Sands on 11 April. The men met their deaths, amongst the baying mob, with calm and resolve. It is probable that the Worcester was seized in an act of revenge against the East India Company (for whom Green had earlier worked) that had seized one of the last ships of the Company of Scotland, the Annandale, the previous year. After the executions of the three, the remaining crewmen were quietly released with no further charge. The incident caused great consternation and anger throughout much of England and provided fodder for the vitriolic patriots on both sides of the border.

Trevelyan concluded that the deaths of the three men served as an outlet for a widely held Scottish resentment of their Anglo-centric government's mismanagement. Examples of the problems partially caused by this mis-governance included the Glencoe Massacre, the ill-fated Darien Scheme (the failure of which was partially attributable to King William's concession to English mercantile interest) and the "seven ill years" (seven bad harvests experienced by Scottish farmers between 1692 and 1698, blame for which must also lie partially with archaic tools, expertise and practices in use at that time).

Scottish historians such as Andrew Lang instead contend that while Green and crew may not have taken Drummond's ship, they had engaged in some piracy after all, and so the trial was not unjust:

Hence I conclude that the 'Worcester' really had been pirating off the coast of Malabar, but that the ship taken by Captain Green in these waters was not the 'Speedy Return,' but another, unknown. If so, there was no great miscarriage of justice, for the indictment against Captain Green did not accuse him of seizing the 'Speedy Return,' but of piracy, robbery, and murder, though the affair of the 'Speedy Return' was brought in to give local colour. This fact and the national excitement in Scotland probably turned the scale with the jury, who otherwise would have returned a verdict of 'Not Proven.'
