= Acts of grace (piracy) =

Pardons for acts of piracy

George I's 1717 proclamation as it appeared in The London Gazette

Acts of grace, in the context of piracy, were state proclamations offering pardons (often royal pardons) for acts of piracy. General pardons for piracy were offered on numerous occasions and by multiple states, for instance by the Kingdom of England and its successor, the Kingdom of Great Britain, in the 17th and 18th centuries.

== Great Britain ==
=== Pardons under Elizabeth I ===
Mary Wolverston was pardoned by Elizabeth I. Thomas Brooke was pardoned for piracy following the intercession of his sister-in-law (his brother being Baron Cobham) and his brother-in-law the Earl of Salisbury.

=== Pardons under James I ===
With the end of the first Anglo-Spanish war under James I, and the corresponding end to English privateering in 1603, English sailors resorted to piracy. In 1611, Captain Richard Bishop became one of the first notable pirates to be pardoned, having surrendered partly due to qualms about attacking English ships. He was allowed to keep his plunder. (Note: Senior writes that it is unclear whether Bishop was allowed to keep all his plunder.) Having retired in the pirate haven of Leamcon near Schull, Munster, in 1617 he was accused of plotting with pirates. Captain Thomas Tompkins also received a pardon around 1610.

Following continued piracy by the likes of Peter Easton, the English government was willing in August 1611 to offer a general pardon, on condition that pirates surrender their ships and goods. With pirates threatening to accept offers of pardon from Tuscany and Savoy, in 1612 the privy council of James I offered pirates a general pardon, also allowing them to keep their loot. At least 12 pirate crews surrendered to the general pardon, including John Jennings and the crew of Captain Baughe (who apparently sued successfully to keep his loot following its confiscation), though a large portion of Baughe's crew would shortly return to piracy, and Easton instead accepted a Savoyard offer in 1613. Captain Roger Middleton, who sailed first to Ireland then to Mehdya to deliver the pardon, extracted bribes from pirates in exchange for their pardon, and encouraged pirates to delay their surrender in order to continue piracy.

The lack of competing pirates in Ireland due to the general pardon saw Henry Mainwaring become notorious in 1613 as leader of a pirate fleet. He would receive offers from Tuscany, Savoy, Tunis and Spain of a pardon should he surrender; however, consistent with his not attacking English ships, in June 1616 he instead accepted an English offer of pardon for himself and his crew, having sought one since the previous year (as too had Lording Barry). Also in 1616, Thomas Tucker (who sailed with Easton) received an English pardon.

In 1623, John Nutt was arrested by Sir John Eliot, having been tricked into negotiating the purchase of an expired offer of pardon. Due to Nutt's connection with Secretary of State George Calvert, he was pardoned following this arrest.

Mainwaring advised the king against pardoning pirates, opining that this encouraged piracy. Clive Senior suggests that the government had an incentive to pardon pirates, since this would keep these potentially useful seamen available in case of war.

=== Colony of Jamaica ===
In preparation for the Second Anglo-Dutch War, Governor Thomas Modyford pardoned some 14 pirates who had been condemned to death, in order to grant privateering commissions to them.

On 15 August 1671, Jamaica's new governor Thomas Lynch offered a general pardon to pirates, which was rejected by Jelles de Lecat.

In April 1677, the Jamaican Assembly passed an act requiring English subjects belonging to the island not to serve foreign states or princes as privateers without licence from the Jamaican governor. That July, the council ordered the issue of a proclamation giving foreign privateers one year to accept a pardon. On 1 August, Peter Beckford wrote that at least 300 privateers had submitted to the act. However, some buccaneers did not submit, and some who had accepted the pardon returned to piracy. A similar proclamation was issued in May 1681.

Though James Browne was hanged in 1677, his crew of eight men was pardoned. In 1682, buccaneer Thomas Paine accepted a pardon from the governor of Jamaica. Jan Willems was made a similar offer. Around 1684, Lynch tried persuading Laurens de Graaf to accept an English pardon.

John Coxon received a pardon after surrendering to the Jamaicans in September 1688.

During the Nine Years' War, Governor William Beeston requested the power to pardon pirates in order to recruit them in the defense of Jamaica, but this seems not to have been granted.

=== 1687/8 proclamation ===
On 22 May 1687, James II renewed the proclamation for the suppression of pirates, offering a limited time in which any pirate who surrendered would receive a pardon. That August, he commissioned Sir Robert Holmes to suppress piracy in a squadron sent to the West Indies. On 20 January 1687/8, (Note: A dual date.) James II issued a proclamation (offering pardons to pirates who surrendered to Holmes or to an appointee of his) in order to ensure that colonial governors would cooperate with Holmes and his agents. Holmes' fleet achieved a temporary reduction in piracy, but the number of pirates had increased again by 1693.

Edward Randolph wrote in 1696 that King Charles II of Spain had agreed to fund an expedition to suppress pirates in the Spanish West Indies (who had been active around 20 years before Randolph's report). This expedition would have been assigned to Holmes (after a proclamation was issued allowing him to procure pardons for those who surrendered) and would have included five or seven of the King of England's frigates, but never went ahead because the King of Spain never paid for it. However, Randolph also wrote that pirates had apparently stopped attacking the Spanish West Indies, instead favoring the Red Sea.

=== 1698 proclamation ===
In a 1696 report by Surveyor-General of Customs in the American colonies Edward Randolph, pardons were recommended (among other methods) as a way to reduce piracy. A specific suggestion was to pardon and recruit one of Thomas Tew's men as a source of intelligence regarding pirates.

With the end of the Nine Years' War in 1697, the Royal Navy could increase its anti-piracy efforts. On 8 December 1698, William III issued a proclamation offering pardons to pirates east of the Cape of Good Hope who surrendered to Captain Thomas Warren. Henry Every and William Kidd were specifically exempted from receiving this pardon, in Kidd's case due to his connections with prominent Whig statesmen.

By the time that Warren arrived at Madagascar's Île Sainte-Marie on 29 January 1699, the Act of Grace had expired. By promising to extend the deadline for surrender, Warren obtained the surrender of Robert Culliford and Dirk Chivers, among others; however, these pirates were taken to trial and all except Culliford (who testified against Samuel Burgess) were hanged. Others in Madagascar, including Nathaniel North, avoided surrendering to Warren. The fact that pirates such as Joseph Bradish and those in Kidd's company were not offered amnesty by the authorities contributed to scepticism regarding acts of grace, including among the crew of Bartholomew Roberts more than two decades later.

== Elsewhere ==
=== China ===
In November 1801, pirate leader Chen Tianbao was pardoned by Chinese authorities.

By 1804, pirate Zheng Yi commanded 400 junks and 70,000 men. These were organized into six large pirate squadrons with flags of corresponding colors. Following a battle with these pirates in Guangzhou Bay, in 1805 a Chinese general offered a pardon to those who would surrender, which perhaps 3000 of them accepted. When Zheng Yi died in 1807, his wife, Zheng Yi Sao, assumed command of the fleet. In January 1810, Black Squadron leader Guo Podai, along with 160 ships and 8000 men, (Note: Rogozinski gives this number as 6000 men.) surrendered to the Jiaqing Emperor, who pardoned them. This was followed by Zheng Yi Sao's successful negotiation of a pardon for herself and her crews in exchange for their surrender.

In the 1840s, a pardon was offered to Shap-ng-tsai, but without success.

=== France ===
Dutch corsair Zymen Danseker fled Algiers for Marseilles in 1609 to receive a French pardon.

Christopher Condent surrendered to a French act of grace in 1721. Rogozinski writes that Condent negotiated for his pardon.

=== Italian states ===
See § Pardons under James I

=== United States ===
During the War of 1812, Jean Lafitte was offered pardons from both the Americans and British if he would aid them in the war. Lafitte accepted the American offer.

== See also ==
- Category:Pardoned pirates

== Bibliography ==
- Earle, Peter (2005). The Pirate Wars. New York: Thomas Dunne Books. ISBN 9780312335793.
- Gosse, Philip (2007). The History of Piracy. Mineola, NY: Dover Publications, Inc. ISBN 978-0-486-46183-0.
- Grey, Charles (1933). Pirates of the Eastern Seas (1618–1723) A Lurid page of History. London: Sampson Low, Marston & Co., Ltd.
- Haring, Clarence H. (1910). The Buccaneers in the West Indies in the XVII Century. New York: E. P. Dutton and Company.
- Murray, Dian H. (1981). "One Woman's Rise to Power: Cheng I's Wife and the Pirates". Historical Reflections / Réflexions Historiques. 8 (3): 147–161. JSTOR 41298765.
- Pringle, Patrick (2001). Jolly Roger: The Story of the Great Age of Piracy. Mineola, NY: Dover Publications. pp. 47–48. ISBN 0-486-41823-5.
- Rogozinski, Jan (1999). Dictionary of Pirates. Ware, Hertfordshire: Wordsworth Editions Ltd. ISBN 1-85326-384-2.
- Senior, Clive M. (1976). A Nation of Pirates. Newton Abbot: David & Charles. ISBN 0-7153-7264-5.
- Thomson, Janice E. (1996). Mercenaries, Pirates, and Sovereigns. Princeton, NJ: Princeton University Press. ISBN 0-691-02571-1.
