= John Halsey (privateer) =

18th-century English pirate

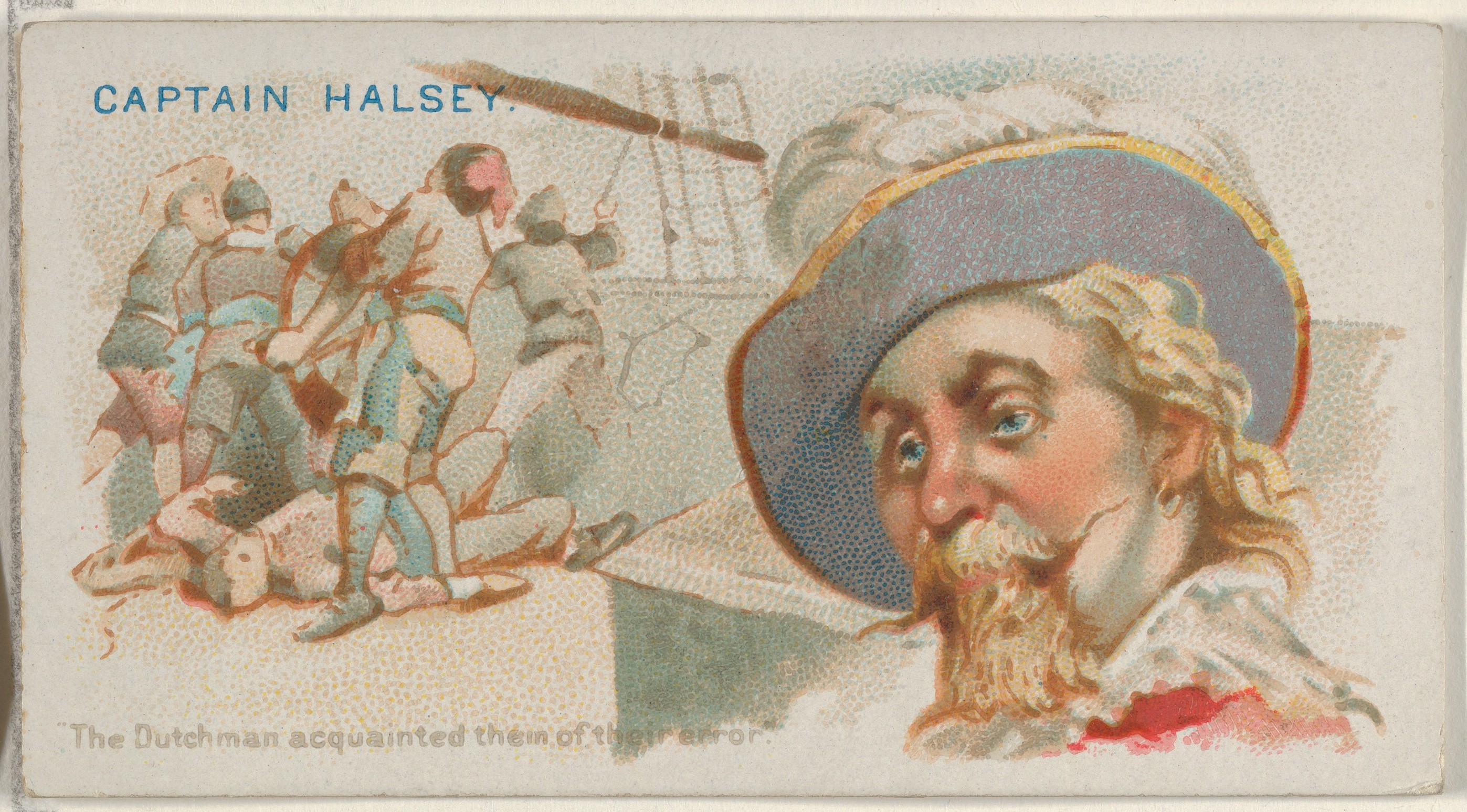
- Born: c. 1662; Boston, Massachusetts
- Died: 1708 (aged 45–46); Madagascar
- Piratical career
- Type: Privateer (c. 1704–1705); pirate (1705–1708)
- Allegiance: Kingdom of Great Britain (as privateer); none (pirate)
- Years active: 1704–1708
- Base of operations: Atlantic Ocean (privateer); Madagascar (pirate)
- Commands: Charles

John Halsey (c. 1662 – 1708) was an English privateer and later a pirate who was active in the Atlantic and Indian Oceans during the early 18th century. Although much of his life and career is unknown, he is recorded in A General History of the Pyrates, which states "He was brave in his Person, courteous to all his Prisoners, lived beloved, and died regretted by his own People. His Grave was made in a garden of watermelons, and fenced in with Palisades to prevent his being rooted up by wild Hogs."

== Biography ==
Born in Boston, Halsey became a privateer in the service of the Kingdom of England commanding the 10-gun brigantine Charles during the War of the Spanish Succession, or Queen Anne's War as it was known in the American colonies. He raided French fishing fleets in Newfoundland and later sailed to Fayal in the Azores and then to the Canary Islands where he attacked Spanish ships en route to Barcelona during 1704. During the voyage, several of his men deserted, as he put his lieutenant ashore at Cape Verde. However, they were subsequently returned to Halsey by the Portuguese governor, who recognized the validity of his privateer's commission. In late 1704 and early 1705 Halsey was in the Caribbean, raiding off Caracas, Venezuela alongside Adrian Claver and other privateers.

As his letter of marque expired the following year, he turned to piracy and sailed to Madagascar. As he made his way around the Cape of Good Hope, putting into the Bay of Saint-Augustin for water, wood, and other provisions, Halsey picked up several castaway sailors of the lost Degrave, formerly under the command of Captain Young. (Note: The most famous of the Degrave's castaways was Robert Drury, who was taken as a slave by Malagasy natives whose territory bordered that of ex-pirate Abraham Samuel, and was not among the crewmen rescued by Halsey.) Leaving Saint-Augustin, he sailed for the Red Sea in search of treasure ships of the Mughal Empire operating in the Indian Ocean.

In late 1706, the Charles spotted a large Dutch ship, which Halsey declined to attack, reluctant to offend a European power. His crew condemned the captain and his gunner for cowardice and mutinied, relieving them of their posts. The crew, who presumed the ship to be a lone merchantman, pressed forward with their attack only to discover, as they approached their intended victim, that the Dutch ship was well-gunned. It fired a warning shot towards the Charles which injured a crew member manning the wheel as well as unstripping the swivel gun and severely damaging the topsail. The Dutch attack caught the crew off guard and many fled into the ship's hold. Despite the damage, the Charles escaped and Halsey was reinstated as commander shortly afterwards.

After seizing two coastal trading vessels off the Nicobar Islands in February 1707, he sailed to the Straits of Malacca. He fared poorly due to the low morale of the crew following the incident of the Dutch ship. Returning to Madagascar, Halsey recruited additional men including his quartermaster Nathaniel North. Setting sail for Mokha, he encountered five British merchantmen shortly after entering the Red Sea in August 1707. Despite being outnumbered, Halsey chose to attack the British ships and after the largest merchantmen fled the other four scattered, with Halsey capturing two ships along with £50,000 in money and cargo.

Following his return to Madagascar in January 1708, his flotilla was virtually destroyed in a hurricane. Halsey died of a fever soon after. David Williams was chosen as Captain of Halsey's final capture, the Scottish Neptune, though it was almost immediately lost in the hurricane.
