= Thomas Warren (Royal Navy officer) =

British commodore

Commodore Thomas Warren
- Died: 12 November 1699
- Military career
- Allegiance: Kingdom of England
- Branch: Royal Navy
- Service years: –1698
- Rank: Commodore
- Commands: HMS Hopewell; HMS Sweepstakes; HMS Crown; HMS Grafton; HMS Monck; HMS Windsor; Commander-in-Chief, West Indies; Commander-in-Chief, Portsmouth
- Conflicts: Nine Years' War; action at Barfleur; action at La Hogue

Commodore Thomas Warren (died 12 November 1699) was a Royal Navy officer who became Commander-in-Chief, Portsmouth.

== Naval career ==
Promoted to captain on 28 May 1689, Warren was given command of the fifth-rate HMS Hopewell in 1690, the fifth-rate HMS Sweepstakes in 1691 and the fourth-rate HMS Crown in 1692. In the Crown he took part in the action at Barfleur in May 1692 and the action at La Hogue in June 1692. He went on to command the third-rate HMS Grafton in 1693, the third-rate HMS Monck in 1694 and the fourth-rate HMS Windsor in 1695. He was appointed Commander-in-Chief, West Indies in May 1696 and Commander-in-Chief, Portsmouth in December 1698.

In December 1698, Warren was tasked with obtaining the surrender of pirates under the 1698 Act of Grace, commanding a squadron consisting of HMS Anglesea, HMS Harwich, HMS Hastings and HMS Lizard. By the time the squadron arrived at Madagascar's Île Sainte-Marie on 29 January 1699, the terms of the Act had expired; therefore, Warren promised to have the dates extended. However, in the case of some pirates, it was ruled that Warren did not have the authority to make such an extension, thus invalidating the pardons. Notably, Warren's commission from the King specifically excluded two pirates from the general pardon: "and also excepting Henry Every alias Bridgman, and William Kidd."
