= Careening =

Method of grounding of a sailing vessel to expose its hull

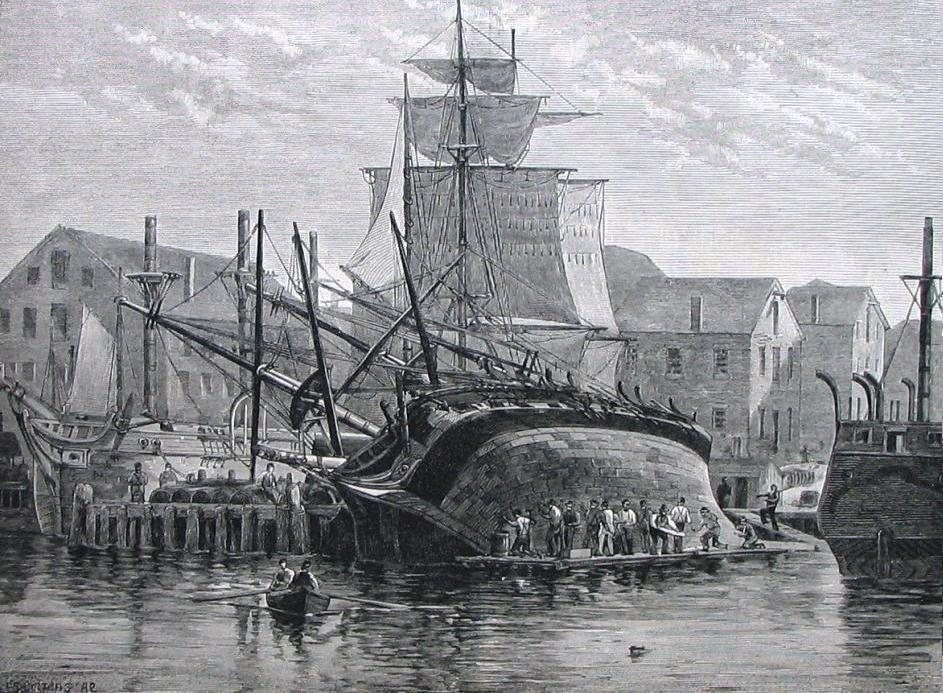
An Old Whaler Hove Down For Repairs, Near New Bedford, a wood engraving drawn by F. S. Cozzens and published in Harper's Weekly, December 1882

Careening (also known as "heaving down") is a method of gaining access to the hull of a sailing vessel without the use of a dry dock. It is used for cleaning or repairing the hull. Before ship's hulls were protected from marine growth by fastening copper sheets over the surface of the hull, fouling by this growth would seriously affect the sailing qualities of a ship, causing a large amount of drag. As this growth was underwater, removing it was difficult. Beaching the vessel at high tide allowed the lower hull to be exposed for cleaning or repairs.

== Etymology ==
The term, and similar terms in French, Spanish and Italian, derive from the term for a ship's keel—carène (French), carena (Spanish), carena (Italian). These come from the Latin term for keel, carīna.

== Practice ==
The ship was grounded broadside on a steep beach at high tide or, in dockyards, moored at a permanent facility for careening known as a careening wharf. A beach favoured for careening was called a careenage. The vessel was then pulled over with tackles from the mastheads to strong points on the shore while the tide went out. If this was being done on a beach, then the ship's guns might be moved to the shore and used as anchoring points. However, a careening wharf in a dockyard was preferred, as it would have been equipped with the capstans and rope tackle necessary for hauling over the ship. If a dockyard was not available—for example, the ship was a pirate ship or in need of repairs while in hostile waters—a beach would have to do. The ship would have been lightened beforehand by removing all stores, and a careening wharf would have had large sheds available to protect them from weather and theft. With one side of the ship raised out of the water, maintenance work would be carried out. When the tide returned, the ship would be floated off and the process repeated if necessary on the other side.

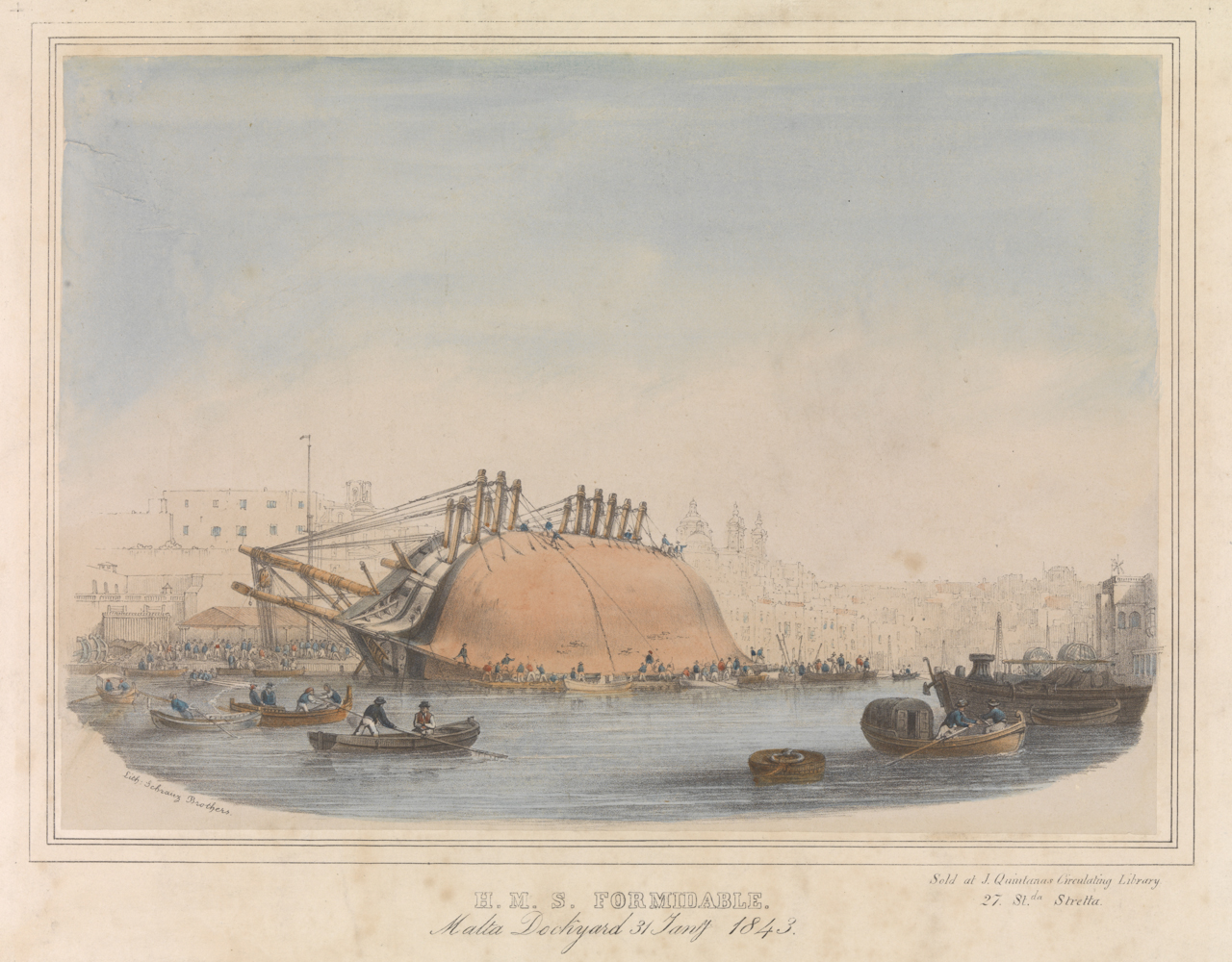
HMS Formidable careened in Malta Dockyard, 31 January 1843

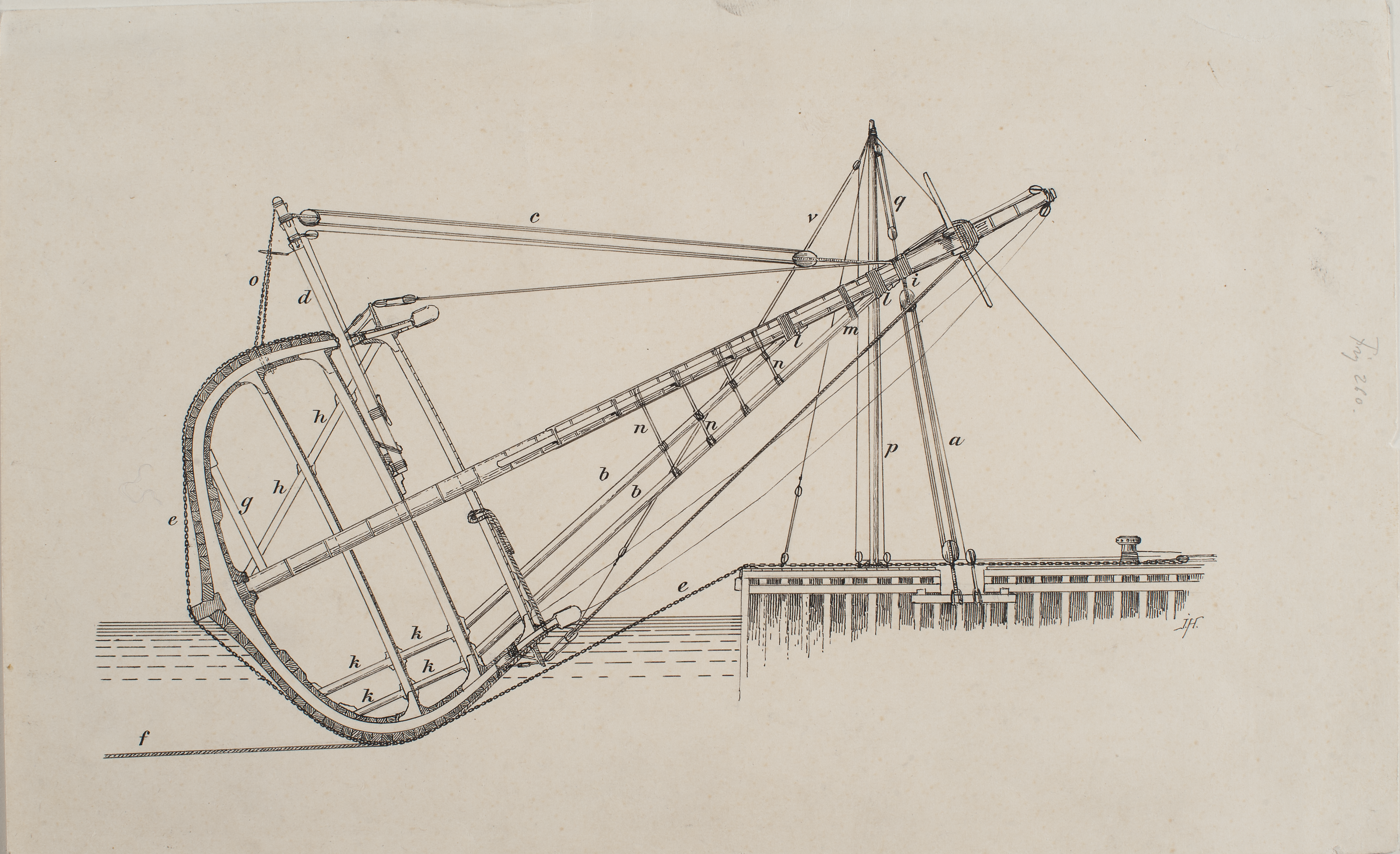
A diagram of careening, from the Lärobok i sjömanskap (Textbook of Seamanship) by Wilhelm Linder, 1896

While a competent crew could careen their ship without outside assistance, it was a laborious task. In early 1843, HMS Formidable was careened at Malta Dockyard to carry out repairs after the ship had grounded a few weeks earlier. An account of the work done notes that every movable item on the ship had to be taken off. Additional structural reinforcements had to be installed in the hull and all the masts and rigging removed except for the lowest parts. The lower gun ports were sealed, reinforced and made watertight. Also a large number of thick, timber outriggers were installed; these were up to two feet (61 cm) across and 40 feet (12 m) long. The ship was pulled over by ropes wound around three capstans; each was turned by 120 men.

In the 18th century, careening wharves existed at overseas Royal Navy dockyards such as Port Mahon and Halifax. They were important facilities and often the first things built when the navy was establishing a new overseas base. However, dockyards in the United Kingdom typically had dry docks. Careening placed a hull under a considerable strain and even a strongly built ship could be structurally weakened or damaged by the procedure. Using a dry dock was preferred if one was available.

At the end of the 18th century, the British navy had 24 dry docks available in Britain, so careening was not usually necessary for ships stationed in British waters. This gave an advantage over their French rivals, as France had few dry docks, and the French Navy had to routinely careen its ships for maintenance. Pirates would often careen their ships because they had no access to dry docks. A secluded bay would suffice for necessary repairs or hull cleaning, and such little "safe havens" could be found throughout the islands in the Caribbean and nearly around the world. One group of islands, Las Tres Marías, off the coast of Mexico, became a haven for pirates after Charles Swan careened his ships there in 1686, followed by another group of buccaneers who sought refuge in the islands later in the same year.

=== Parliamentary heel ===
A practice similar to careening was a Parliamentary heel, in which the vessel was heeled over in deep water by shifting weight, such as ballast or guns, to one side. In this way the upper sides could be cleaned or repaired with minimal delay. Famously, HMS Royal George sank at Spithead off Portsmouth while undergoing a Parliamentary heel in 1782, killing hundreds of people on board.

== Modern practice ==
Careening in the traditional sense can only be done on a sailing vessel as its masts are used for hauling it over. Today, larger ships are placed in dry dock; smaller vessels can be lifted from the water by a crane or a travel lift.

A procedure known as careening is still sometimes done with smaller boats, but differs from what was done historically in that the boat is not winched over by cables attached to the mast. The boat is simply moored at a location where it will be grounded and its hull exposed at low tide. For a few hours, it is possible to carry out inspection or maintenance before the rising tide refloats the boat.

== See also ==
- Careening Bay, Western Australia
- Careening Cove, Sydney, New South Wales, Australia
- Careenage, Barbados
- Port of La Turballe
