= John Bowen (pirate) =

Pirate during the Golden Age of Piracy

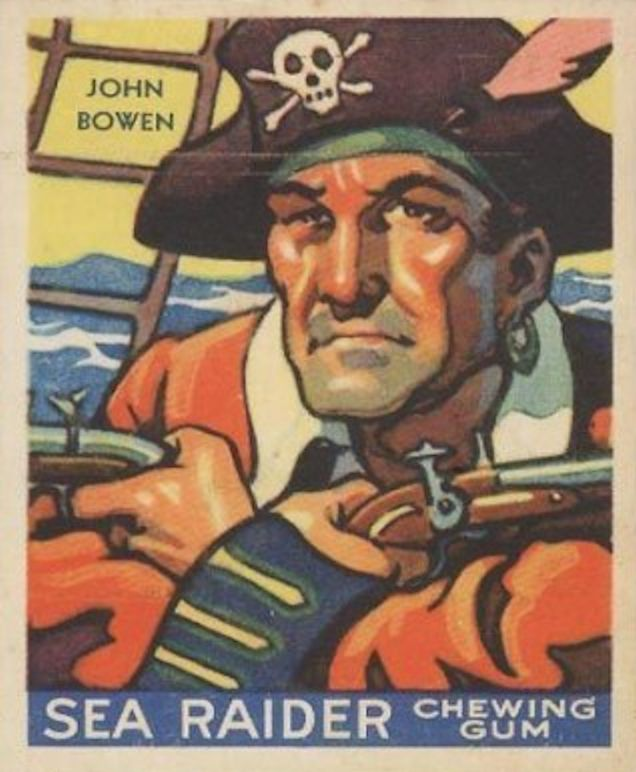
- Bowen on a 1933 World Wide Gum Co. trading card
- Born: Unknown
- Died: 1704; Mascarene Islands
- Piratical career
- Type: Pirate
- Years active: 1700–1704
- Rank: Captain
- Base of operations: Indian Ocean, Red Sea
- Commands: Speaker, Speedy Return, Defiant
- Wealth: £170,000;

John Bowen (16?? – 1704) was a pirate of Créole origin active during the Golden Age of Piracy. He sailed with other famous contemporaries, including Nathaniel North (who would succeed him as captain of Bowen's final ship, the Defiant) and George Booth, who was his captain when he was a crewman aboard the Speaker. Over a four-year period, Bowen took about £170,000 in goods and coinage and retired to Bourbon for a brief period of time before his death in 1704.

== Early life ==
Bowen's place of birth is unknown, he later moved to the proprietary colony of Carolina, where he signed on an English ship, serving as a petty officer. Bowen's ship was attacked and he was captured by French pirates. The pirates crossed the Atlantic Ocean, heading to Madagascar, but they ran aground near Elesa on the south of the island. Bowen and the other English prisoners managed to seize the ship's longboat and they sailed the 15 leagues (45 miles) to St. Augustine. Bowen remained at St. Augustine for the next 18 months before finally deciding to become a pirate himself. He joined the crew of Captain Read, being elected sailing master by the crew.

Following Read's capture of a large Indian ship, Bowen returned to Madagascar and joined George Booth as a crewman. In April 1699, Booth captured a 450-ton, 50-gun former slave ship, the Speaker. Bowen served under Booth's command until 1700, when Booth was killed by Arabs at Zanzibar when negotiating for the resupplying of his ship.

== Piratical career ==
=== Captain of the Speaker ===
Bowen was initially successful. He attacked a 13-strong fleet of Moorish ships and, though some of them escaped in darkness, captured a prize with an estimated value of £100,000. Following this, Bowen attacked a number of ships, including an English East Indiaman commanded by Captain Conway in November 1701, off the coast of Malabar. Despite these attacks, Bowen was able to continue to trade in local ports - following his attack on the East Indiaman, Bowen openly towed her into the nearby port of Callicoon and sold her in three shares to local merchants. The Speaker was lost in late 1701 when, during a voyage to Madagascar, she ran aground St. Thomas' Reef off Mauritius. However, Bowen and most of the crew were able to reach the shore. After three months on the island, they were able to purchase a sloop and, after converting it into a brigantine (later renamed as the Content), he and his crew left and, upon arriving at Madagascar, founded a town and at fort Maratan.

=== As captain of the Speedy Return ===
In early 1702, Bowen and a number of pirates seized the Speedy Return, commanded by Captain Drummond, as well as the aged Brigantine Content (some sources say Continent), both owned by the Company of Scotland, which Drummond had planned to fill with slaves from Île Sainte-Marie to sale to Portuguese cocoa plantation owners in Africa. The Speedy Return was refitted to use against commercial vessels. The Speedy Return and the Content left Maratan together, but on the first night of the voyage, the Content ran aground on a ledge. Unaware of this, Bowen continued to sail for the Mascarene Islands. He expected to find the Rook Galley, as the ship had been sighted there earlier by former members of Drummond's crew. However, the Rook Galley was gone and Bowen decided to sail to Mauritius to look for her. Still unable to find the vessel, Bowen did not attack the ships in the harbour, since he did not know their strength. Instead, he sailed to Augustin Bay, where he met the Content. However, when the Content was examined, he found it to be useless to him and had the vessel burned. The crew came aboard the Speedy Return.

In late 1702 Bowen once again met Thomas Howard, who, after leaving Bowen's crew at Madagascar following the loss of the Speaker had, along with a group of pirates, taken the 36-gun Prosperous, at the port of Mayotta. By Christmas, Bowen and Howard decided to join their forces. In March 1703 Bowen had the Speedy Return careened and it was not until August 1703 that together they attacked and plundered the East Indiaman Pembroke near Johanna Island, one of the Comoros Islands. Bowen and Howard then attacked two Indian ships in the Red Sea, capturing the larger and renaming her Defiant.

Thomas Green and his crew were accused of piracy by a Scottish court, suspected in part of plundering the Speedy Return and killing its captain Robert Drummond. Despite two survivors of Bowen's attack testifying that Green was not involved, Green and two of his officers were executed in 1705.

== Return to Rajapura, retirement and death ==
After declaring the Speedy Return and Prosperous unsound, they were burned and Bowen took command of the Defiant. Having also taken a sum of £70,000, Bowen returned to the port of Rajapura where the plunder was divided, and Thomas Howard remained, and then on to the Mascarene Islands where he and 40 others left the Defiant, with his intention being to retire from piracy and to return to Madagascar. However, within six months Bowen died of an unspecified intestinal disease and was buried on Bourbon. Following his retirement, Nathaniel North was elected to replace him as Captain of the Defiant.
