= 1698 in piracy =

See also 1697 in piracy, 1699 in piracy, and Timeline of piracy.

== Events ==
- December 8 – William III of England issues his 1698 Act of Grace.

=== Indian Ocean ===
- January 30 – Captain William Kidd plunders the Quedagh Merchant, an Armenian merchant vessel sailing under French passes, near the Malabar Coast.
- April – Kidd encounters Robert Culliford's pirate vessel Mocha Frigate at Île Sainte-Marie. Most of Kidd's crew desert to Culliford. Kidd burns the Adventure Galley and takes his remaining crew aboard the Adventure Prize (ex-Quedagh Merchant).
- September – Culliford and Dirk Chivers plunder the Great Muhammed.

=== North America ===
- Undated – Canoot attacks and steals John Redwood's ship then raids the town of Lewes the next day.
- Undated – William Cotter and his former shipmate John Blackmore are convicted of piracy but receive no punishment.

=== South America ===
- Undated – Anne Dieu-le-Veut is released from Colombia after being captured by Spain.

== Births ==
- Charles Harris

== Deaths ==
- Robert Colley
- Richard Glover
- Robert Glover
