= 1696 in piracy =

See also 1695 in piracy, Other events in 1696, 1697 in piracy, and Timeline of piracy.

This article covers 1696 in piracy.

== Events ==
=== Europe ===
- Undated – 24 of Henry Every's pirates are arrested in Ireland and England. Every eludes capture and is never seen again.
- January 26 – William Kidd issued a letter of marque by King William III of England.
- May – Kidd sets sail from Plymouth, England en route to New York City aboard the Adventure Galley.

=== North America ===
- September – Kidd leaves New York on the Adventure Galley.
