= Kidd the Pirate =

"Kidd the Pirate" is a short story by the American author Washington Irving, based on legends of Captain William Kidd. The story was published in Tales of a Traveller, an 1824 collection of Irving's writings, where it immediately precedes that work's most famous story "The Devil and Tom Walker", which also involves Kidd's treasure.

== Synopsis ==
The story begins "In old times, just after the territory of the New Netherlands had been wrested from the hands of their High Mightinesses, the Lords States General of Holland, by King Charles the Second". This "unquiet state" is said to have led to an increase in adventurers, buccaneers, pirates, and privateers.

=== Outline of Kidd's life ===
Captain Kidd is employed to "put a stop" to piracy, under the logic of "setting a rogue to catch a rogue". He sets sail, first for New York, and later for the East. There he "turned pirate himself" and plunders in the "Madeiras, to Bonavista, and Madagascar, and … the entrance of the Red Sea".

Kidd returns to Boston, "laden with booty". Learning that he was to be arrested, Kidd buried "the greater part of his treasures". Once arrested, Kidd is returned to England and executed by hanging. This action is said to "spread sudden consternation among the buccaneers in every part of the provinces”, who likewise "secreted their money and jewels in lonely out-of-the-way places".

=== Rise of Money-Diggers ===
Irving writes that reports of "buried great treasures of gold and jewels ... set the brains of all the good people along the coast in a ferment." There are "rumours on rumours" of recovered treasure, including coins with Moorish inscriptions which "the common people looked on with superstitious awe, regarding the Moorish letters as diabolical or magical characters".

Irving writes of many stories of treasure hunts, noting that "in all the stories ... the devil played a conspicuous part". In some cases, "he was conciliated by ceremonies and invocations". Nonetheless, the devil often plays "some slippery trick". Irving records that "Some would dig so far as to come to an iron chest" only to fall victim to some "baffling circumstance", as when "the earth would fall in and fill up the pit, or some direful noise or apparition would frighten the party from the place".

=== A rusted pistol ===
The remainder of the story provides a bridge to the next story, "The Devil and Tom Walker". Irving writes of "one calm day in the latter part of the summer" when he and others were fishing. One of this party recovers "a long pistol of very curious and outlandish fashion". One man speculated that the pistol was "a relique of the buccaneers of old times" that may have "belonged to Kidd himself".

This inspires one of the party to recount "a story about a fellow who once dug up Kidd's buried money". This story is included in the following chapter under the title "The Devil and Tom Walker".

== Influence ==
This story, along with several of Irving's others, was influential in American folklore tales of Pirates and buried treasure.
