= Nightshade (Connelly novel) =

2025 novel by Michael Connelly

- Hardcover edition
- Author: Michael Connelly
- Language: English
- Series: Stilwell
- Release number: 1
- Genre: Crime, mystery, thriller
- Publisher: Little, Brown and Company
- Publication date: May 20, 2025
- Publication place: United States
- Media type: Print (hardback & paperback)
- Pages: 352
- ISBN: 978-0-316-58848-5
- OCLC: 1473798240
- Dewey Decimal: 813.54
- LC Class: PS3553.O51165
- Followed by: Ironwood

Nightshade is a crime thriller novel, and the forty novel by American author Michael Connelly. It introduces Los Angeles County Sheriff's Department detective Stilwell gets reassigned to Catalina Island, where he investigates a poaching case and a Jane Doe found in the harbor.

The book was published on May 20, 2025 by Little, Brown and Company.

== Plot ==
On Catalina Island, Detective Steve Stilwell rushes through paperwork to execute a search warrant near Avalon. At Island Mystery Tours, he finds blood on a saw and suspects owner Oscar "Baby Head" Terranova of beheading a federally protected buffalo.

A young woman with a purple streak in her hair is found dead in Avalon Harbor. Mayor Doug Allen urges Stilwell to keep news quiet to protect tourism. Detective Rex Ahearn, Stilwell's longtime rival, arrives from the mainland to take charge. Ahearn warns Stilwell not to interfere. After the mayor's efforts, the death makes front-page news beside the report of the headless buffalo. Merris Spivak is detained after assaulting an officer.

A statue disappears from the exclusive Black Marlin Club. Stilwell learns the accused thief, Leigh-Anne Moss, had purple-streaked hair. Club manager Charles Crane says Moss was dismissed for flirting with members and may have stolen the statue out of spite.

With help from his girlfriend, assistant harbormaster Tash Dano, Stilwell reviews footage of suspicious boat activity around the club before Moss died. He suspects someone struck Moss with the missing marlin statue and dumped her from the sailing yacht Emerald Sea. Henry Gaston, a man questioned at the tour warehouse, also goes missing.

Stilwell visits the mainland to question Moss's former boyfriend, who says she pursued wealthy older men. Emerald Sea owner Mason Colbrink claims he was away and never approved a departure. A search finds a replacement sail bag and possibly a replacement anchor. Crewman Duncan Forbes denies knowing Moss and offers an alibi, then admits the original equipment was stolen while the yacht lay at the club and he replaced it without informing Colbrink.

Captain Corum reprimands Stilwell for continuing his inquiries. Stilwell presents his findings and earns permission to join Ahearn and partner Frank Sampedro. Back on Catalina, Moss's former roommate, Leslie Sneed, lets him search her room. He finds designer shoes and a note from Daniel Easterbrook.

Gaston returns to the station seeking protection from Terranova. He admits Terranova paid him to mutilate the buffalo to attract tour customers. He also implicates Mayor Allen in a scheme to force approval of an unpopular Ferris wheel. While Gaston is detained, Spivak kills him and escapes with his confession. Corum plans to blame Gaston and spare Terranova, so Stilwell leaks the truth to journalist Lionel McKey.

Spivak kidnaps Tash and demands destruction of the bloodied saw. Stilwell tracks her phone and rescues her, killing Spivak. The suspended pending an Internal Affairs review, he visits Easterbrook, who says he and Moss loved each other and that she quit voluntarily. He suspects Crane lied, Tash grows distant over Stilwell's persistence.

After therapy clears Stilwell for duty, Easterbrook is found dead. The county police name him their prime suspect in Moss's death. Stilwell accuses Ahearn of framing an innocent man to close the case.

District attorney Monika Juarez admits Terranova blackmailed her. Terranova offers evidence that Allen ordered Gaston's death and receives immunity for helping prosecute the mayor. Stilwell secretly records Crane implying he killed Moss after she ended their affair. He arrests Crane, but cannot obtain a confession.

Terranova's testimony brings Allen's arrest, the mayor denies wrongdoing. McKey films his handcuffed removal from City Hall. In the end, Stilwell finds Tash at a secluded campsite, and they reunite.

== Release ==
Nightshade is scheduled to be released and publishing date by Little, Brown and Company in the United States on May 20, 2025.

== Reception ==
Publishers Weekly praised the novel's atmosphere, plotting, dialogue, and character development, noting similarities to John D. MacDonald's crime fiction and describing Detective Stilwell as a promising protagonist for a new series. Kirkus Reviews gave the novel a positive review, commending Connelly's handling of Stilwell's personal relationships and his growing partnership with assistant district attorney Monika Juarez, while noting that the conclusion leaves some unresolved questions. Terry Zobeck of the Washington Independent Review of Books praised the novel's pacing, atmosphere, realistic dialogue, plotting, and characterization, predicting that Stilwell would become a popular addition to Connelly's recurring cast of protagonists. Ray Palen of BookReporter described the novel as a promising start to the Catalina series and expressed interest in revisiting its characters in subsequent installments. Book Marks, aggregating four professional reviews, classified the overall critical reception as positive, with one rave review and three positive reviews.
