= 1697 in piracy =

See also 1696 in piracy, other events in 1697, 1698 in piracy and Timeline of piracy.

This article covers 1697 in piracy.

== Events ==
=== Indian Ocean ===
- Undated - Adam Baldridge flees Madagascar to avoid attack by neighbors for engaging in the slave trade.
- October 30 - William Kidd murders his gunner, William Moore.
