= The Adventure of the German Student =

- Short story by Washington Irving
- Language: English
- Genres: Horror, short story

Publication
- Media type: Print (hardcover and paperback)
- Publication date: 1824

"The Adventure of the German Student" is a short story by Washington Irving, which was published in 1824 in his collection of essays Tales of a Traveller. The story was inspired by a French tale of unknown origin, and several variations of the story have since appeared in print.

== Background ==
In the introduction to Tales of a Traveller, Irving, under the guise of his fictional alter-ego Geoffrey Crayon, writes that "the following adventures were related to me by the same nervous gentleman" who he claims told him the story of "The Stout Gentleman", which was published in Irving's 1822 episodic novel Bracebridge Hall. In regards to "The Adventure of the German student", Irving writes that "the story, or rather than the latter part of it, is founded on an anecdote related to me as existing somewhere in the French". Irving would go on to reveal in journals that the story had been told to him by Thomas Moore.

== Plot ==
The story is set during the French Revolution, and follows a young German named Gottfried Wolfgang who has come to Paris, France to complete his studies. Returning to his apartment on a stormy night, Wolfgang encounters a woman sitting at the base of the guillotine who claims to be without friends, family, or home. She is described as wearing "a broad, black band round her neck, clasped by diamonds". Wolfgang takes her back to his lodgings, where they declare their devotion for one another. The next morning, after temporarily leaving the woman alone, Wolfgang returns to find her a corpse in his bed. The police are summoned, and one of the officers recognizes the woman as having been executed by guillotine the previous day. The officer undoes the collar around the neck of the corpse, causing the head to roll onto the floor. At the end of the story, the incident is revealed to have been recounted by "the old gentleman with the haunted head", and is said to have been relayed by Wolfgang, who now resides in a madhouse in Paris.

== Other versions ==
Alexandre Dumas implemented a similar plot for his 1851 story "La femme au collier de velours", or "The woman with the velvet necklace". Some later collections of Irving's work use Dumas's title for Irving's version of the story. It is unknown whether Dumas was inspired by Irving's story, or whether they both drew inspiration from a common source.

Gaston Leroux's 1924 story "La femme au collier de velours" has a similar plot. The October 1929 issue of Weird Tales published a translation with the title "The Woman with the Velvet Collar". In February 1927 they had published Irving's story using the title "The Lady of the Velvet Collar".

A variation of the story appears under the title "The Velvet Ribbon" in the 1970 children's book Ghostly Fun by Ann McGovern. In this version, an unnamed woman, who always wears a black velvet ribbon around her neck, marries a man who becomes increasingly frustrated at her refusal to remove the ribbon. One night, the husband retrieves a pair of scissors from the wife's sewing basket. He cuts the ribbon with the scissors, causing her head to roll onto the floor. This version of the story was re-printed in the book The Haunted House and Other Spooky Poems and Tales that same year.

Yet another variation of the story, titled "The Green Ribbon", appears in the 1984 book In a Dark, Dark Room and Other Scary Stories by Alvin Schwartz. In this version, a girl named Jenny, who wears a green ribbon around her neck, meets a boy named Alfred. Jenny refuses to tell Alfred why she wears the ribbon, even when wearing the ribbon as the two are married. After reaching old age, Jenny allows Alfred to untie the ribbon, causing her head to fall onto the floor.

Carmen Maria Machado offers a reworking of the tale as the short story "The Husband Stitch" in her collection Her Body and Other Parties.

Shel Silverstein's poem "Long Scarf" is a variation of the story, in which the narrator describes how he was once beheaded and now wears a scarf to hold his head on his neck, before inviting the reader to untie it. The poem is included in his collection Falling Up.
