= Ironwood (Connelly novel) =

2026 novel by Michael Connelly

- Hardcover edition
- Author: Michael Connelly
- Language: English
- Series: Stilwell
- Release number: 2
- Genre: Crime, mystery, thriller
- Publisher: Little, Brown and Company
- Publication date: May 19, 2026
- Publication place: United States
- Media type: Print (hardback & paperback)
- Pages: 327
- ISBN: 978-0-316-59538-4
- OCLC: 1584404330
- Dewey Decimal: 813.6
- LC Class: PS3553.O51165
- Preceded by: Nightshade

Ironwood is a crime thriller novel, and the forty-second novel by American author Michael Connelly and his second to feature Los Angeles County Sheriff's Department Detective Stilwell. The novel follows Stilwell as he investigates a failed drug interception and a missing woman's disappearance on Catalina Island.

The book was published on May 19, 2026 by Little, Brown and Company.

== Plot ==
Detective Sergeant Stilwell supervises Catalina Island's sheriff's substation. Deputy Alton Quigley's informant reports an incoming drug plane, leading to a nighttime operation at the airstrip. A man on an ATV flees as Stilwell's team moves in. Stilwell chases him down a mountainside while Quigley and Deputy Ilsa Ramirez approach the plane. Returning without the rider, Stilwell finds Quigley dead and Ramirez critically wounded. The plane escapes, Captain Corum arrives from the mainland and bars Stilwell from the case. Stilwell arrests Kalas, but two men posing as federal immigration agents soon remove him from jail. He suspects an inside job.

While cleaning the substation, Stilwell finds a backpack submitted two months earlier. A Medeco key belongs to Angela Metier, missing for four years after hiking on Catalina. LAPD Detective Renée Ballard says Metier is among several missing female hikers believed killed by one offender. They find her remains in an ironwood grove. Reviewing footage from Candace Neary's search, Stilwell spots park ranger Kent Middleton near the tree where Neary's body was found.

Ramirez tells Stilwell through a tablet that she and Quigley had an affair. She says the sniper shouted Quigley's name before firing. Quigley's wife was also unfaithful, and her attorney confirms an affair with Lieutenant Gavin Lambert. Kalas's removal and the departure of investigators Ernie Simon and Bob Trestle deepen Stilwell's doubts about Corum. Ballard's team names Middleton as its suspect. He has stalked hiking guide Molly Young online and booked a private hike with her in Angeles National Forest under a false name.

The LAPD Special Investigation Section watches the trailhead. Middleton cannot isolate Young and is arrested, though police find no murder kit. Ballard and Stilwell hold him for 48 hours. Stilwell reasons that Middleton hid his equipment after sensing pursuit. He identifies the Reagan State Building as the only place Middleton visited alone after leaving the ferry. A search of an elevator ceiling uncovers Middleton's backpack, with a murder journal, garrote, folding shovel, and other items. Middleton is arrested, but Ballard reports that he died by suicide in his cell.

Stilwell returns to Quigley's killing. Lambert's military file identifies him as a decorated Marine scout sniper. A bullet fragment points to a rare round made by MIPCO Ammo, owned by Walter Bessemer, a former Marine who served with Lambert in Fallujah. Posing as Lambert, Stilwell calls Bessemer, alerting Lambert. Marina footage places both men aboard Bessemer's boat, the Bullet, near Catalina on murder night.

Expecting Lambert and Bessemer to return, Stilwell prepares a trap. He lures Lambert into his office with an old interview recording, disarms him, and locks him in a cell. Corum admits his complicity and threatens to blame Stilwell for Kalas's escape unless he releases Lambert. Stilwell refuses, shuts down the station's audio and video systems, and calls Catalina Call reporter Lionel McKey to expose them.

== Release ==
Ironwood is scheduled to be released and publishing date by Little, Brown and Company in the United States on May 19, 2026.

== Reception ==
Ironwood received positive reviews from critics, with praise for its investigative plotting, suspense, character development, and Connelly's storytelling. Library Journal and Booklist awarded the novel starred reviews, commending its relentless pacing, engaging characters, dialogue, and suspenseful investigations. Kirkus Reviews recommended the novel, praising Connelly's handling of interconnected cases, Stilwell's demanding police work, and the suspenseful conclusion.
