= Quedagh Merchant =

Indian merchant ship captured by William Kidd in 1698

History
- Name: Quedagh Merchant (– c. 1698); Adventure Prize (c. 1698–)
- Owner: Coirgi
- Fate: Sunk c. 1698

General characteristics
- Tonnage: 350 tons

Quedagh Merchant (/ˈkwiːdɑː(x)/; Armenian: Քեդահյան վաճառական Qedahyan Waćařakan), also known as the Cara Merchant and the Adventure Prize, was an Armenian merchant vessel famously captured by Scottish privateer William Kidd on 30 January 1698.

The ship was originally owned by a man named Coirgi, a French corruption of "Kurji", a Khoja name common in Gujarat. After the ship's capture, Kidd attempted to return to New York to share in the treasure with the governor of that colony, then on to England to pay off his backers.

The capture of Quedagh Merchant, as well as Rouparelle, caused a scandal throughout the British Empire, hurting Britain's safe trading status along the African and Indian coasts. Although Kidd felt that both of these captures were legal in accordance with his commission, word spread quickly that Captain Kidd was a pirate. Kidd was later imprisoned and ultimately executed for alleged acts of piracy, as well as murder.

The fate of Quedagh Merchant rested in the hands of merchants hired by Captain Kidd to guard the ship and await his return to the Caribbean in three months' time. During Kidd's long imprisonment in New York and later in England, New York Governor Lord Richard Bellomont attempted to extract a confession for the location of the ship, which was left anchored in a lagoon along Santa Catalina. When word reached New York that the merchants had sold off most of the goods, burned the ship, and sailed to Holland, Lord Bellomont sent a ship to verify that it had indeed been burned. The exact location of the remains of Quedagh Merchant were a mystery until December 2007, when they were discovered off the coast of Catalina Island, Dominican Republic.

== Merchant voyage ==
In April 1696, a group of Armenian merchants hired the 350-ton Quedagh Merchant, owned by an Indian man named Coirgi. Operating out of Surat in north-western India, the Armenians were assisted by Augun Peree Callendar, a local English East India Company representative who freelanced to help supplement his income. For the voyage, the ship was captained by John Wright, had two Dutch first mates, a French gunner, more than 90 Indian crewmen, and 30 Armenian merchants.

After several delays, the crew loaded the ship with cotton, and departed from Surat, travelled around the tip of India, and reached Bengal in late 1697. There, the Armenian merchants sold their cotton for 1,200 muslins and other cloths, 1,400 bags of brown sugar, 84 bales of raw silk, 80 chests of opium, and other items such as iron and saltpetre. For safe passage, the group applied to Francois Martin, the representative for the French East India Company. The request was granted promising him the protection of the French Crown, and the ship began its return trip around the tip of India.

== Capture by Captain Kidd ==
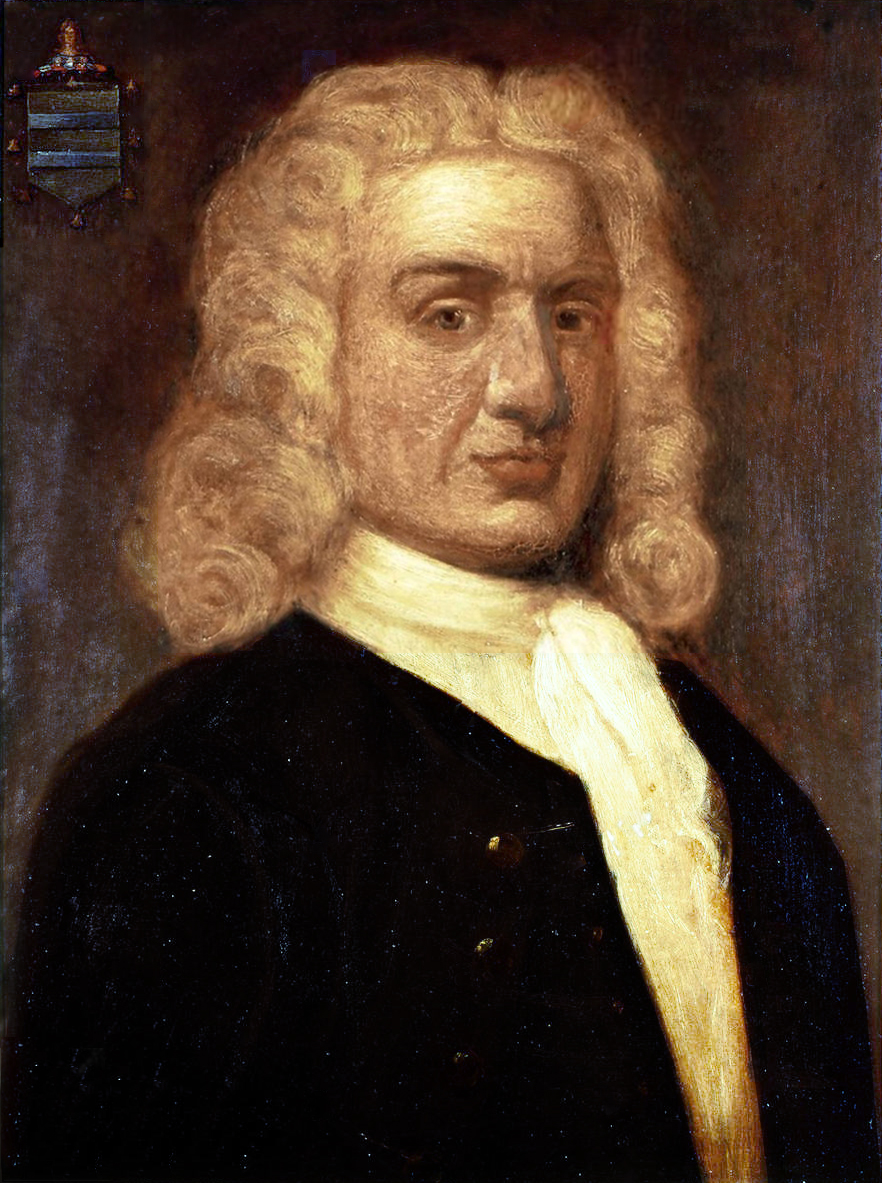
Captain William Kidd

On 30 January 1698, Captain Kidd, aboard his ship Adventure Galley, spotted Quedagh Merchant about 25 leagues from Cochin, and raced to catch up with it. After approximately four hours, Adventure Galley caught up with Quedagh and hoisted a French flag for its colours, and Kidd commanded the other captain to board his ship. A Frenchman came over by boat, and when he stepped aboard Adventure Galley Kidd gave the command to hoist an English flag. The Frenchman, upon seeing the flag change, reportedly replied, "Here is a good Prize."

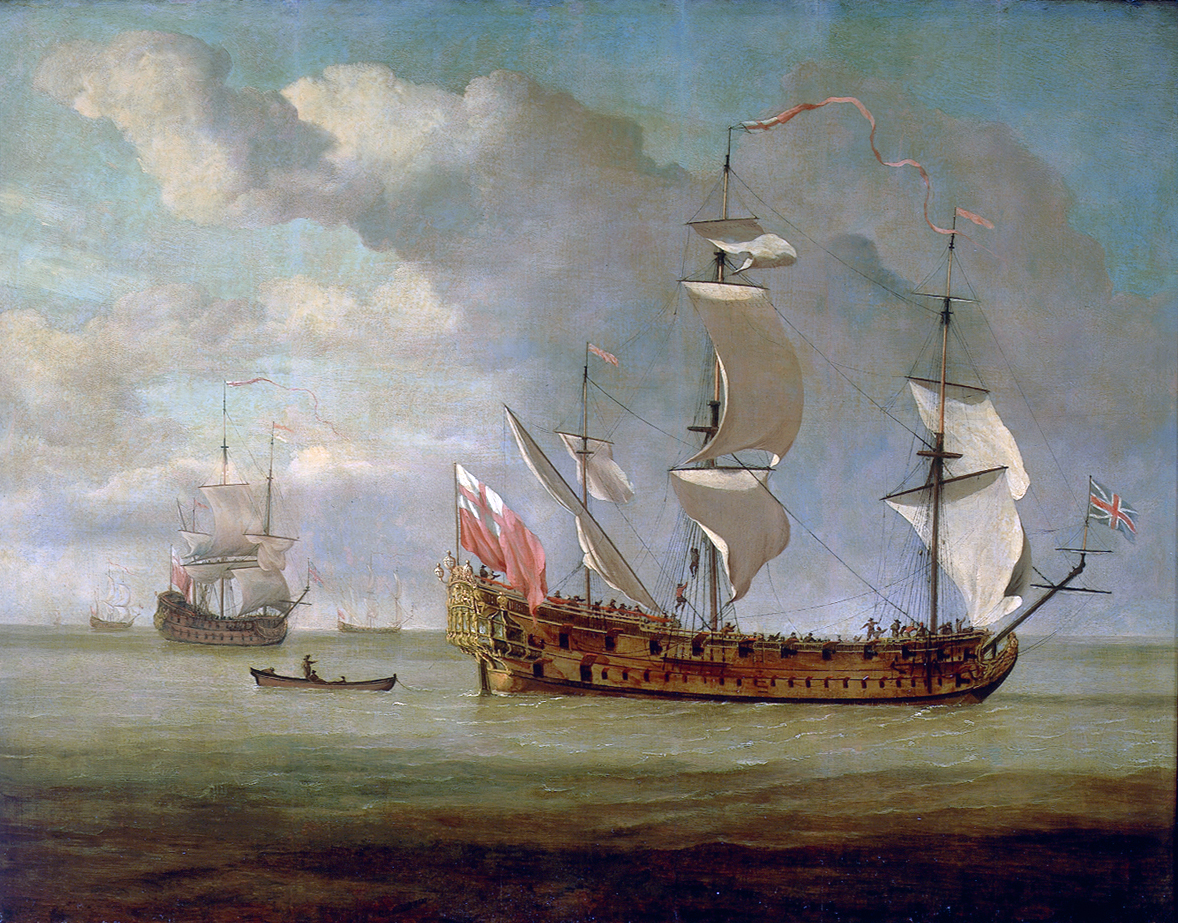
The Charles Galley, a contemporary vessel of a comparable design to Adventure Galley

Kidd's mission to capture any enemy and pirate ships was commissioned by several English Lords. Kidd was to seize all loot and return to England to split the treasure among himself, his crew, and the Lord investors. The Quedagh Merchant was Indian owned, flying Armenian colours, captained by an Englishman, and had a mostly Indian crew, so seemed to not fit Kidd's commission; but the fact that it had been promised safe passage by the French, an English enemy, technically made this seizure a legal capture.

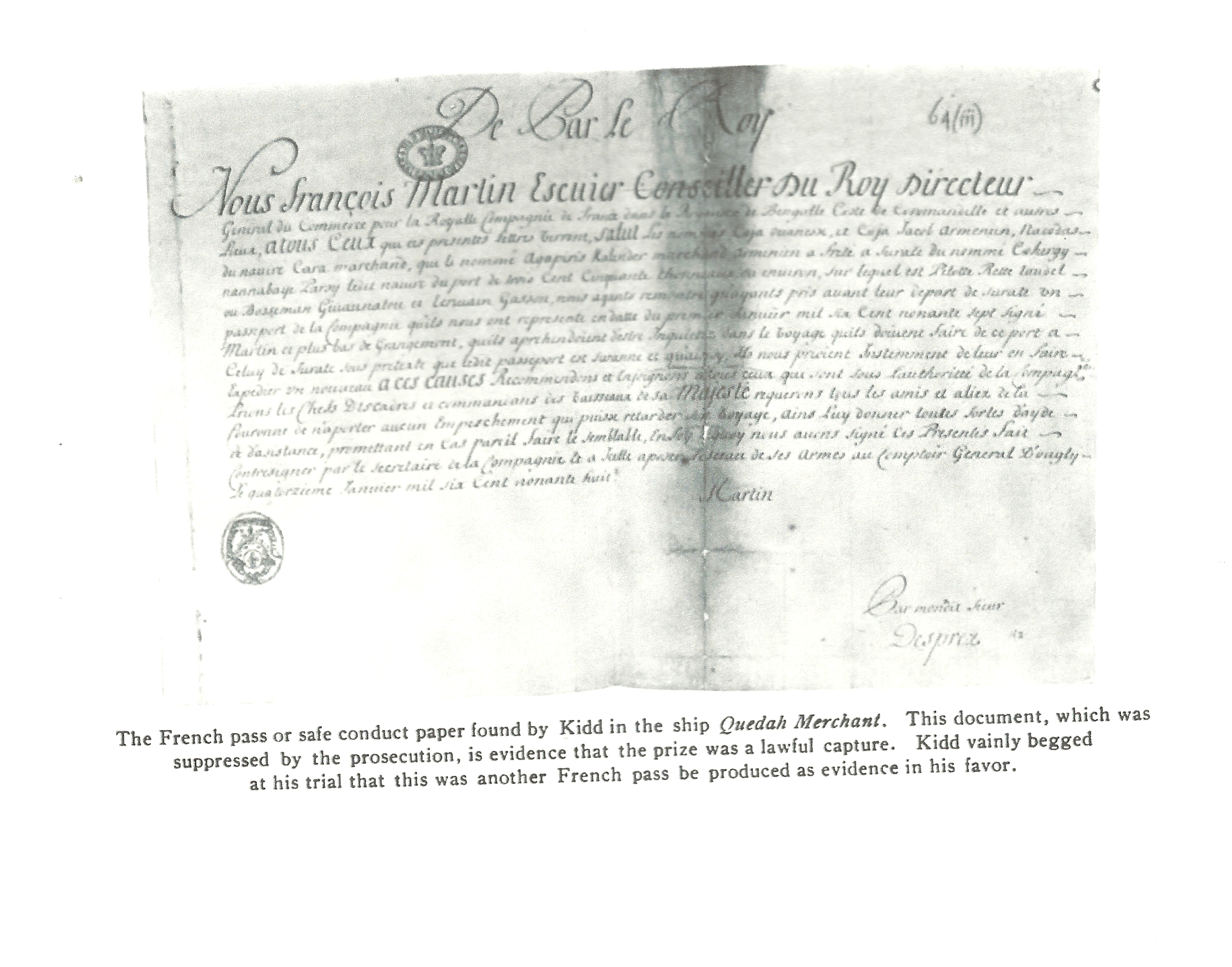
The French pass from the "Quedagh Merchant"

When Kidd and his crew began the inspection of Quedagh Merchant, while inventorying the loot, the Frenchman mentioned that he was not actually the captain of the vessel, but that Mr. Wright was indeed the man in that role. Kidd located Captain Wright below deck, and he denied being the captain, although the French pass identified him as the captain with the inscription "pilot Rette". Wright also informed him that an agent for the English East India Company had brokered the voyage. Kidd, acknowledging that looting this ship could raise concerns back in England, decided that the crew vote on whether to take the ship and its cargo, or sell it back to the Armenians. A man named Cogi Baba offered to buy the ship and its cargo back for what amounted to 1/20 of the actual value of the cargo, but the men of Kidd's crew rejected the offer. Kidd did not fight the vote, knowing that this was a legal capture.

Kidd did not know that hundreds of the bales below deck belonged to a nobleman, Muklis Khan, who was close to the Grand Moghul. The crews of Adventure Galley, Quedagh Merchant, and Rouparelle, another ship captured by Kidd and renamed November, set sail for Cochin and Kalliguilon harbour to sell some of the goods to finance his trip back to England. After selling much of the cargo for gold, he left the harbour hurriedly to escape four ships of the Dutch East India Company that were attempting to capture him. Kidd gave orders that if his group of three ships broke up, to meet at St. Mary's Island, Madagascar.

== St. Mary's Island ==
When Kidd arrived at St. Mary's Island aboard Adventure Galley, he spotted a ship that belonged to noted pirate, Robert Culliford, Mocha Frigate. Since Kidd's mission was to capture pirate treasure, he immediately began a battle plan, but he felt undermanned, so he decided to wait for his other two ships, November and Quedagh Merchant, to arrive before attacking. Six weeks passed before both November and Quedagh Merchant arrived at St. Mary's Island.

=== Mutiny ===
After a short time, Kidd called for all of his crew to gather on Quedagh Merchant. He told his men to ready themselves for battle, but the crew, wanting to get paid after two years with Kidd, voted 100 to 15 to mutiny over to Culliford. The following morning, the mutinied crew began to off-load the treasure aboard Quedagh Merchant. Kidd, after a show of force and personality, was able to convince his former crewmen to give back his, and his few remaining loyal crew, their share of the treasure. Culliford's men proceeded to strip all three ships of anything of value, including weapons, sails, rigging, and anchors. Before Culliford departed St. Mary's Island, his crew sank November, leaving Kidd with two stripped down ships, and a skeleton crew. Surprisingly, one of the men that chose to stay was an old rogue seaman named James Gilliam, who was a pirate at one time, but like Kidd, also believed that the mission was noble and had refused to turn pirate.

== Adventure Prize ==
Kidd decided that there were enough sail parts, rigging, and metalwork available left on Adventure Galley, and moved everything to Quedagh Merchant, the ship he chose to be his vessel to travel back to New York. It was during this time that Kidd insisted on calling Quedagh Merchant the Adventure Prize. The first stop on his return journey was Port Dolphin, 600 miles (970 km) down the coast of the Madagascar, then over to Tulear, also along the Madagascar coast, to buy provisions, and find more crew members.

Feeling that his ship appeared stolen, which could cause him problems, even though he had his documents to prove otherwise, he decided to avoid the main shipping ports. He planned to head to the obscurity of Annobón off central Africa. From there he planned on going straight to the Caribbean, then up to New York. He arrived in the Caribbean a full ten months after his crew had mutinied, and anchored his vessel along the coast of Anguilla, the northernmost Leeward Island. It was here that he first learned that he was now a wanted pirate, with many governors having orders to arrest Kidd and his crew.

With nowhere to go, with Quedagh Merchant leaking and "too stolen looking", Kidd decided he needed a new ship. He moved his ship and what was left of his crew to Mona Island, a Spanish held Caribbean island. With help from a passing merchant, Henry Bolton, Kidd was able to sell some of his treasure for provisions and enough money to buy Bolton's sloop, St. Antonio.

Kidd decided his best plan was to sail to New York, in his new ship, and convince one of his backers, Governor Bellomont, that he served honourably, and that the stories of his piracy were not true. He authorized Mr. Bolton to stay and guard Adventure Prize, which was now in a lagoon on the small island of Santa Catalina, along with the authorization to sell more of the cargo if he was able to get a good deal. Kidd promised to return in three months, then whatever merchandise was sold, the shares would be divided then.

== Attempted retrieval ==
When Kidd arrived in New York, he was arrested, but would not reveal the location of Adventure Prize, believing that the treasure aboard the ship could be used as barter to free him. Bellomont tried to get together two ships, one of which was St. Antonio, to sail back to the Caribbean to retrieve what was left of Kidd's loot. As the planning stage for this voyage was nearly completed, a sloop arrived in New York, claiming that the merchants aboard Adventure Prize had sold off most of the goods, set fire to the ship, and left the Caribbean to sail to Holland. After hearing this news, Bellomont approved Captain Nathaniel Cary, aboard St. Antonio, to return to the Caribbean to verify that the ship was indeed burned off the coast of Hispaniola, and attempt to reclaim the cargo from the local governments, including Curaçao. According to local records, the men Kidd entrusted with his ship reportedly looted it, and then set it ablaze and adrift down the Rio Dulce.

== Discovery ==
In December 2007, 70 feet (21 m) off the coast of Catalina Island in the Dominican Republic, the remains of a shipwreck were discovered by a local resident and then investigated by archaeologists from Indiana University. The team was surprised that this ship, that had been sought after by many a treasure hunter over the centuries, was located so close to shore in shallow, crystal clear water. Confidence among the investigators was high that this was the remains of Quedagh Merchant due to consistencies of historical records, and the cannons found in the wreckage. The Indiana University team has been licensed to investigate the site, and convert the site into an underwater preserve, where it will be accessible to the public.

Since the ship is an important symbol of Armenian commercial history, attempts to find the ship had for some time been made by Armenian scientists as well. Ayas Nautical Research Club led by Karen Balayan, who in 2004-6 had sailed around Europe in a replica of the 13th-century Armenian vessel Kilikia, published a paper in March 2007, saying they would undertake an expedition to the Caribbean Sea aboard a 46-foot yacht, Anahit, sailing under the flag of Armenia.

== Referenced materials ==
- Zacks, Richard (2002). The Pirate Hunter: The True Story of Captain Kidd. Hyperion. p. 153. ISBN 0-7868-6533-4.
