= Hendrick van der Heul =

- Born: May 14, 1676; New Amsterdam
- Died: 1762 (aged 85–86); Northwest Passage
- Cause of death: Hypothermia
- Occupation: privateer
- Years active: 1696-1762
- Known for: Being William Kidd's quartermaster
- Parents: Abraham Jansen van der Heul (father); Tryntjen Kip (mother)

Hendrick van der Heul (14 May 1676 – c. 1762) was a Dutch privateer who served with Captain William Kidd as his quartermaster. Though evidence seems lacking, he later purportedly led an attempt to traverse the Northwest Passage during which he and his crew froze to death. Because of references to him as a "small black man", he has sometimes been identified as African, which would make him the highest-ranking known black pirate. However, his known ancestry is Dutch, and the description may simply mean that he had swarthy skin and/or black hair.

== Early life and career ==
Van der Heul was born in 1676, in New Amsterdam, the site of present-day lower Manhattan, the son of Abraham Jansen van der Heul. His mother, Tryntjen Kip, was born in 1633 in Amsterdam and died in 1695. Hendrick married Marritje Meyer, with whom he had five children.

=== Privateer ===
In 1696, Scottish seafarer William Kidd received letters of Marque from agents of King William III and other prominent English lords to outfit a ship and proceed to the Indian Ocean to find and take from the five or six known European pirate vessels in those waters any merchant goods they had and eliminate the threat they posed to trade between England and India. Van der Heul served as his quartermaster. Quartermasters on pirate vessels were entitled to two shares of the booty like the captain, and were elected by the crew. He also was responsible for dividing the shares equally.

Van der Heul moved to Montaukett territory, where he settled and built a family. He became a master's mate on a merchant vessel and in 1730, captained a ship north in search of the Northwest Passage, for which a prize of £20,000 was offered.
