= William Burke (pirate) =

Irish pirate and trader (d. 1699)

- Died: 1699
- Piratical career
- Base of operations: Caribbean, Newfoundland

William Burke (died 1699, first name occasionally Thomas, last name occasionally Burk, Burt, Bourck, Burch, or Burcke) was an Irish pirate and trader active in the Caribbean and near Newfoundland, best known for aiding William Kidd.

== History ==
Burke had been active through early 1699 as a pirate off Newfoundland in his 140-man, 24-gun ship Marigold. He was known to colonial governors as "very strong, and said to have a good ship". After menacing the Newfoundland fishing fleets he sailed to the Caribbean, trading slaves between Barbados and Curacao.

In May 1699 he visited Governor Lorentz of St. Thomas offering to fence goods from William Kidd, who had been in the area to sell off his remaining plunder and sell or replace his leaking ship Quedagh Merchant (which Kidd had renamed Adventure Prize). Burke had purchased Kidd's pirated loot just a few weeks earlier, before Kidd left for New York to try clearing his name. The Governor had already rebuffed Kidd's entreaties and refused Burke as well. The local Brandenburg representative Van Belle accepted Burke's offer and through intermediaries took possession of Kidd's merchandise. Six of Kidd's sailors left the Quedagh Merchant with Burke, who sailed for Curacao. Governor Lorentz had Burke arrested on June 1, though he was released a week later; Van Belle paid Burke's fines.

In August 1699 Burke's ship was lost in a hurricane. He and all but 7 or 8 of his crew perished. Governor Bellomont of New York, who had written the King complaining of Lorentz and other Caribbean governors protecting Burke and Kidd, hailed this: "Tis good news."

== See also ==
- Admiralty court, which would have tried Burke or Kidd for piracy (though Burke was actually tried for receiving stolen goods).
