= Tales of a Traveller =

1824 book by Washington Irving

Tales of a Traveller, by Geoffrey Crayon, Gent.
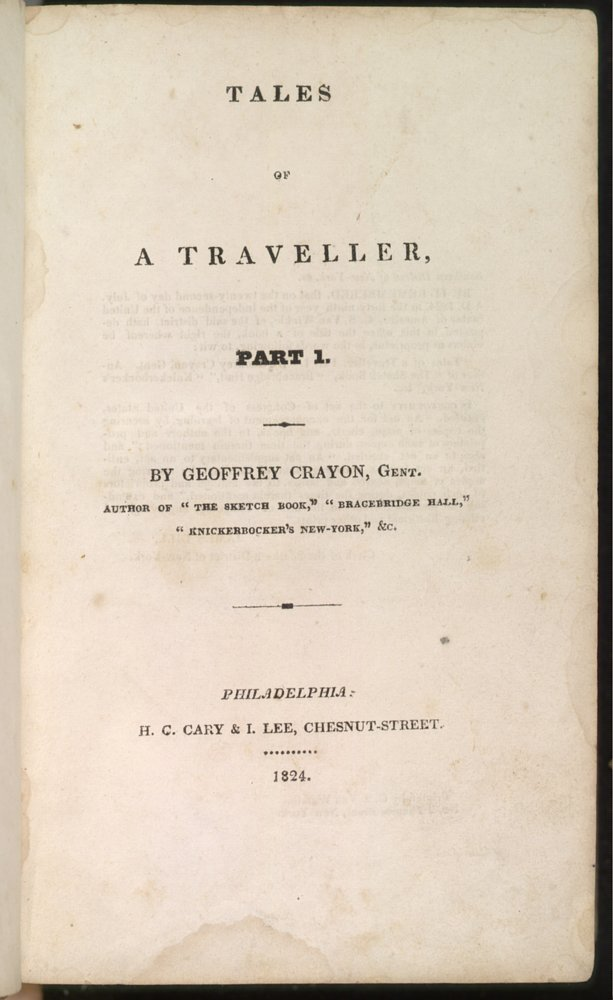
- Volume 1 of the first US edition.
- Author: Washington Irving
- Language: English
- Genre: Essays & Short stories
- Publisher: John Murray (London); H.C. Cary & I. Lee (Philadelphia)
- Publication date: 1824
- Publication place: United States/England (concurrently published)
- Media type: Print (Hardback & Paperback)
- ISBN: 0-940450-59-3 (reprint)
- OCLC: 22207793
- Dewey Decimal: 813/.2 20
- LC Class: PS2052 1991
- Preceded by: Bracebridge Hall
- Followed by: A History of the Life and Voyages of Christopher Columbus

Tales of a Traveller, by Geoffrey Crayon, Gent. is an 1824 two-volume, four-part (plus an introduction) collection of essays and short stories authored by Washington Irving. He compiled the collection while he was living in Europe, primarily in Germany and Paris and published it under his pseudonym, Geoffrey Crayon, Gent. Notable stories included are "The Adventure of the German Student", "Kidd the Pirate", and "The Devil and Tom Walker".

== Reception ==
Irving thought highly of Tales of a Traveller, saying: "I think there are in it some of the best things I have ever written". He was therefore disappointed by the book's generally poor critical reception. Critic John Neal was severe in his critique, saying in American Writers: "We hardly know how to speak of this sad affair .... No wonder that people have begun to question his originality". By the early 20th century, critics generally ranked it lower than The Sketch Book.
