= The Devil and Tom Walker =

Short story by Washington Irving

- Short story by Washington Irving
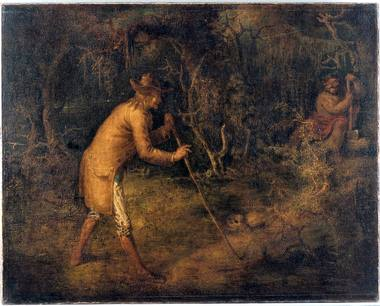
- Country: United States/England

Publication
- Published in: Tales of a Traveller
- Publisher: John Murray (UK); Carey & Lea (USA)
- Media type: Print
- Publication date: 1824

"The Devil and Tom Walker" is a short story by Washington Irving that first appeared in his 1824 collection Tales of a Traveller, in "The Money-Diggers" part of volume II. The story is very similar to the German legend of Faust.

The story inspired other tales, including Wilhelm Hauff's "Heart of Stone" (1827) and Stephen Vincent Benét's "The Devil and Daniel Webster" (1936).

== Summary ==
The story first recounts the legend of the pirate William Kidd, who is rumored to have buried a large treasure in a forest in colonial Massachusetts. Kidd made a deal with the devil to protect his money. The devil's conditions are unknown. Kidd died, never able to reclaim his money, but the devil has protected it ever since.

The story continues around 1727. Tom Walker, a greedy, selfish miser of a man, cherishes money along with his shrewish and equally greedy wife. They live in a tarnished-looking house that had stood alone and has an air of starvation. This is until he takes a walk in an abandoned Wampanoag fortress at the swamp (a relic of King Philip's War of 1675–1678), and starts up a conversation with the devil incarnate (referred to as "Old Scratch" and "the Black Man" in the story). Old Scratch appears as a lumberjack or a woodsman chopping trees, each with a prominent and wealthy colonialist's name branded on the trunk. One rotted and soon-to-fall tree has the name of a deacon who grew wealthy "trading" with the Indians. Another fallen trunk has that of a wealthy seaman rumored to be a pirate. Old Scratch strikes a deal with Tom Walker, offering the riches hidden in the swamp by Captain Kidd in exchange for a great price, which is often thought to be his soul. Tom agrees to think about it and returns home.

While Tom is perfectly willing to sell himself to Old Scratch for the treasure, he does not do so at first, as it would mean having to share the treasure with his wife. After he tells her of his meeting, she meets with Old Scratch herself, but tells her husband that Old Scratch requires an offering. When Tom is away, she takes all their valuables in and goes to make a deal with Old Scratch. When Tom searches for his wife and property, all he finds is her apron holding her heart and liver, tied to a tree.

Tom Walker agrees to Old Scratch's deal, as he considered his abusive wife's death a good thing. Because he can only use the treasure in Old Scratch's service, Tom agrees to become a usurer (today commonly called a loan shark), after refusing to become a slave trader.

During the governorship of Jonathan Belcher (1730–1741), speculation runs rampant and Walker's business flourishes. Becoming a member of the local stock exchange, Tom buys a big house and a coach but furnishes neither, even though he has the money (he is so miserly that he even half-starves his horses). Tom never tires of swindling people until he suddenly becomes fearful about the afterlife. He then becomes an obsessive church-goer, singing hymns in church in a much louder voice than all of the other parishioners, and always keeping two Bibles at hand—thinking that any sin on his neighbor's "account" is a "credit" to his own. He is said to have even had his best riding horse saddled and buried upside down in the belief that in the last days the world will be turned upside down and he will then try to "outride" Old Scratch (although the narrator adds that this is "probably a mere old wives' fable").

One day a "poor land stock jobber" (land speculator) who had borrowed money from him asks for "a few months' indulgence" and irritates Tom who says, "The devil take me if I have made a farthing!" (the smallest currency of the time, 1/4 of a penny). There are three loud knocks at the door. Tom is drawn towards a black-cloaked figure and realizes, in horror, that he has left his Bibles at his desk.

Old Scratch tosses Tom Walker on the back of a black horse, which dashes "down the street ... striking fire out of the pavement at every bound". Tom is never seen again. All his assets become worthless—his coach horses become skeletons, the gold and silver Tom hoarded turns into wood chips and shavings, his mortgages and deeds become cinders, and his great house burns to the ground. Since that day, his ghost haunts the site of the old fortress. His only legacy is a New England saying, "The Devil and Tom Walker".

== Adaptations ==
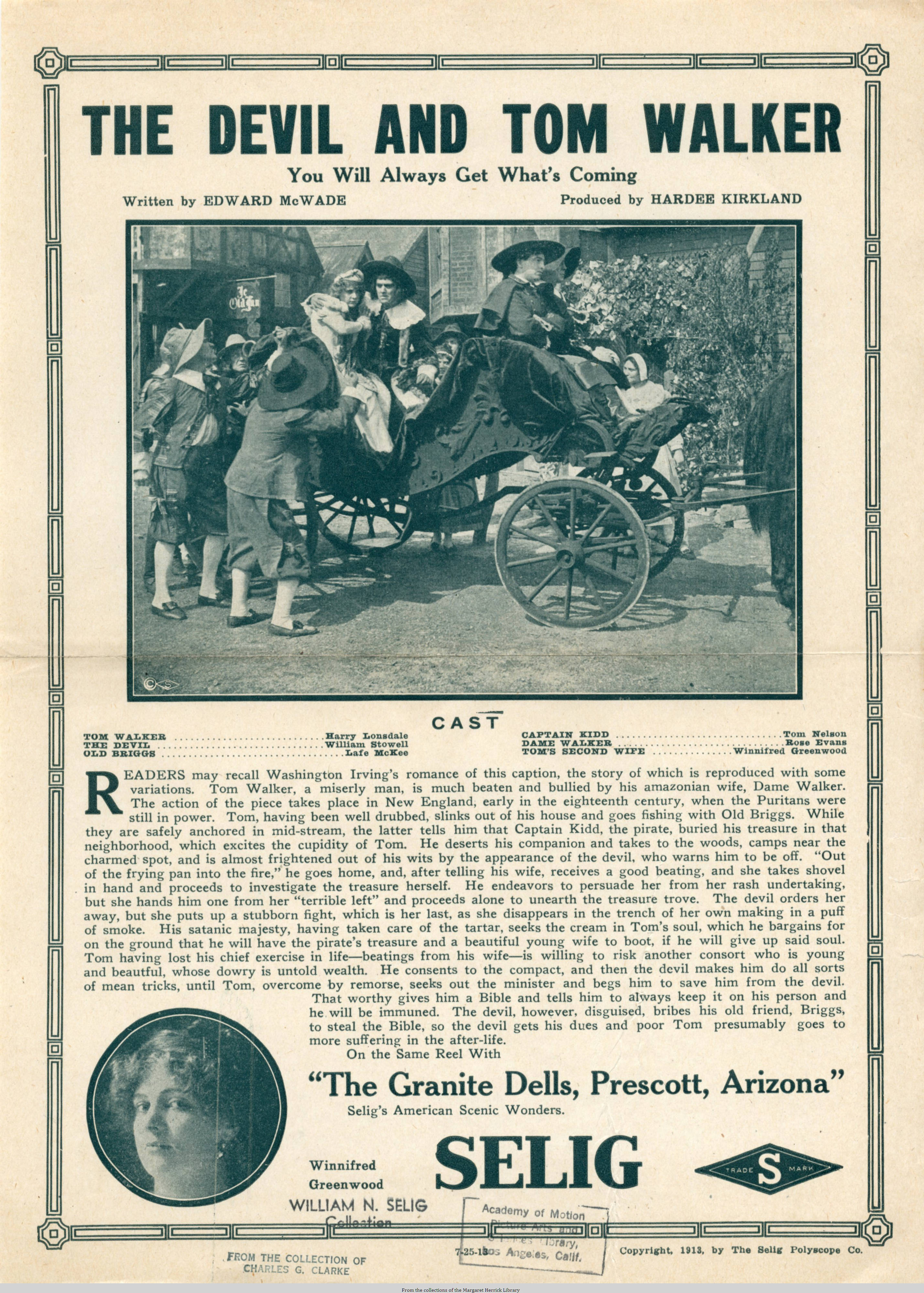
Flier for The Devil and Tom Walker, 1913

In 2001, there debuted on the Arena Stage in Washington an adaption in the form of full-length play by John Strand.

In 2017, experimental rock band, Flummox, released the single, “Tom Walker Blues,” whose lyrics & music video loosely adapt the tale.

In 2019, the story was adapted into audio drama as part of the debut season of Shadows at the Door: The Podcast.

In 2022, a one act version of "The Devil and Tom Walker" for the stage was published by Lazy Bee Scripts.

In 2023, a multi-voice adaptation was created for the Grandaddy of Horror podcast. This version does not include the segue to "Wolfert Webber, or Golden Dreams" but is otherwise unabridged.

== Influence ==
Wilhelm Hauff used this story as the source for the second part of his tale "Heart of Stone" (1827), telling the story as if it was a traditional legend from the Black Forest.

Stephen Vincent Benét drew much of his inspiration for "The Devil and Daniel Webster" (1936) from this tale.

== Editions ==
- Washington Irving, Rip Van Winkle; Legend of Sleepy Hollow; The Devil and Tom Walker; The Voyage; Westminster Abbey; Stratford-on-Avon; The Stout Gentleman, Doubleday & McClure Company, 1902, pp. 93–113: "The Devil and Tom Walker".
