= Bracebridge Hall =

1822 novel by Washington Irving

- First edition
- Author: Washington Irving
- Language: English
- Publisher: John Murray (UK); Moses Thomas (USA)
- Publication date: 1822
- Publication place: United States / England (concurrently published)
- Media type: Print (hardback), 2 volumes
- ISBN: 0-554-33977-3 (reprint)
- Preceded by: The Sketch Book of Geoffrey Crayon, Gent.
- Followed by: Tales of a Traveller

Bracebridge Hall, or The Humorists, A Medley was written by Washington Irving in 1821, while he lived in England, and published in 1822. This episodic novel was originally published under his pseudonym Geoffrey Crayon.

== Plot introduction ==
As this is a location-based series of character sketches, there are a number of individual plots. The tales centre on the occupants of an English manor (based on Aston Hall, near Birmingham, England, which was occupied by members of the Bracebridge family and which Irving visited).

The character of Ready Money Jack was also inspired by someone Irving met near Birmingham.

== Plot summary ==
As this is a series of character sketches, the most effective way currently to describe this book is to list the contents.

=== Volume I ===
1. The Author
2. The Hall
3. The Busy Man
4. Family Servants
5. The Widow
6. The Lovers
7. Family Reliques
8. An Old Soldier
9. The Widow's Retinue
10. Ready Money Jack
11. Bachelors
12. Wives
13. Story Telling
14. The Stout Gentleman
15. Forest Trees
16. A Literary Antiquary
17. The Farm-House
18. Horsemanship
19. Love-Symptoms
20. Falconry
21. Hawking
22. St. Mark's Eve
23. Gentility
24. Fortune Telling
25. Love-Charms
26. The Library
27. The Student of Salamanca

=== Volume II ===
1. English Country Gentleman
2. A Bachelor's Confessions
3. English Gravity
4. Gipsies
5. May-Day Customs
6. Village Worthies
7. The Schoolmaster
8. The School
9. A Village Politician
10. The Rookery
11. May-Day
12. The Manuscript
13. Annette Delarbre
14. Travelling
15. Popular Superstitions
16. The Culprit
17. Family Misfortunes
18. Lovers' Troubles
19. The Historian
20. The Haunted House
21. Dolph Heyliger
22. The Storm-Ship
23. The Wedding
24. The Author's Farewell

== Release details ==
All are hardcover editions except the 1823 and 1991 (binding unknown).

- 1822, USA, C.S. Van Winkle, 2 volumes (May 21, 1822) – published by M&S Thomas, Philadelphia
- 1822, UK, John Murray (May 23, 1822)
- 1823, Berlin, German translation
- 1836, USA, Carey, Lea and Blanchard, 2 volumes
- 1865, USA, G.P. Putnam's Sons, complete in one volume, by Geoffrey Crayon, Gent.
- 1869, USA, G.P. Putnam and Son
- 1876 (dated 1877), London, Macmillan & Co., one volume edition, illustrated by Randolph Caldecott
- 1890, London, Edinburgh & New York, T. Nelson and Sons
- 1895, New York, Wilmore-Andrew Publishing Co., Mayflower Series. (With some, but not all, Randolph Caldecott illustrations)
- 1978, USA, Sleepy Hollow Restorations (October 1, 1978), ISBN 0-912882-35-2
- 1990, USA, Ams Pr (June 1, 1990), ISBN 0-404-03508-6
- 1991, USA, Library of America: Bracebridge Hall, Tales of a Traveller, The Alhambra (March 1, 1991), ISBN 978-0-940450-59-2
