= William Kidd =

Scottish privateer (c. 1645–1701)

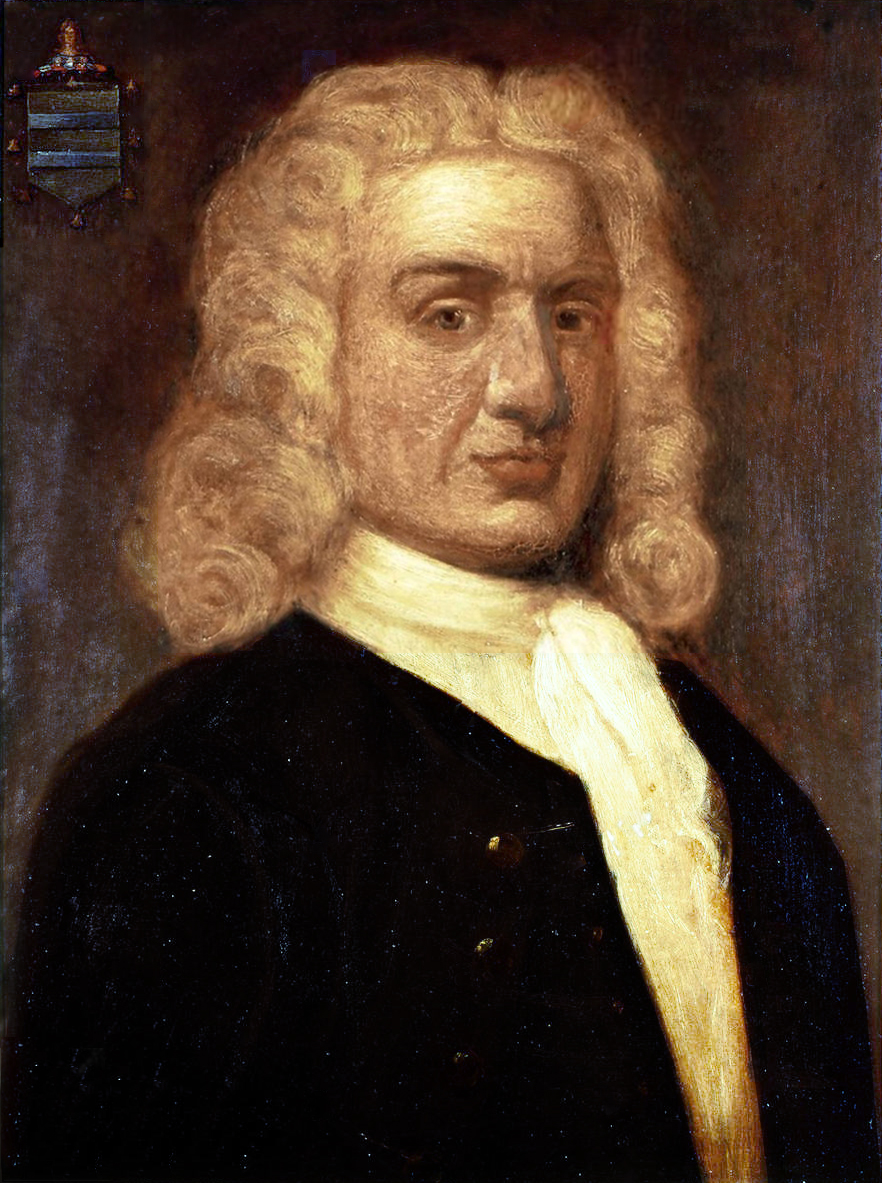
- Portrait by James Thornhill
- Born: c. 1645; Dundee, Angus, Kingdom of Scotland
- Died: 23 May 1701 (aged 56); Wapping, Middlesex, Kingdom of England
- Cause of death: Execution by hanging
- Piratical career
- Type: Privateer
- Allegiance: Kingdom of England; Province of New York
- Commands: Blessed William; Adventure Galley

William Kidd (c. 1645 – 23 May 1701), also known as Captain William Kidd or simply Captain Kidd, was a Scottish privateer. Conflicting accounts exist regarding his early life, but he was likely born in Dundee and later settled in New York City. By 1690, Kidd had become a highly successful privateer, commissioned to protect English interests in the Thirteen Colonies in North America and the West Indies.

In 1695, Kidd received a royal commission from the Earl of Bellomont, the governor of New York, Massachusetts Bay and New Hampshire, to hunt down pirates and enemy French ships in the Indian Ocean. He received a letter of marque and set sail on a new ship, Adventure Galley, the following year. On his voyage he failed to find many targets, lost much of his crew, and faced threats of mutiny. In 1698, Kidd captured his greatest prize, the 400-ton Quedagh Merchant, a ship hired by Armenian merchants and captained by an Englishman. The political climate in England had turned against him, however, and he was denounced as a pirate. Bellomont engineered Kidd's arrest upon his return to Boston and sent him to stand trial in London. He was found guilty and hanged in 1701.

Kidd was romanticised after his death and his exploits became a popular subject of pirate-themed works of fiction. The belief that he had left buried treasure contributed significantly to his legend, which inspired numerous treasure hunts in the following centuries.

== Life and career ==
=== Early life and education ===
Kidd was born in Dundee, Scotland prior to 15 October 1645. While claims have been made of alternative birthplaces, including Greenock and Belfast, he said himself he came from Dundee in a testimony given by Kidd to the High Court of Admiralty in 1695. There have also been records of his baptism taking place in Dundee. A local society supported the family financially after the death of the father. The myth that his "father was thought to have been a Church of Scotland minister" has been discounted, insofar as there is no mention of the name in comprehensive Church of Scotland records for the period. Others still hold the contrary view.

=== Early voyages ===
As a young man, Kidd settled in New York City, which the English had taken over from the Dutch. There he befriended many prominent colonial citizens, including three governors. Some accounts suggest that he served as a seaman's apprentice on a pirate ship during this time, before beginning his more famous seagoing exploits as a privateer.

By 1689, Kidd was a member of a French–English pirate crew sailing the Caribbean under Captain Jean Fantin. During one of their voyages, Kidd and other crew members mutinied, ousting the captain and sailing to the British colony of Nevis. There they renamed the ship Blessed William, and Kidd became captain either as a result of election by the ship's crew, or by appointment of Christopher Codrington, governor of the island of Nevis.

Kidd was an experienced leader and sailor by that time, and the Blessed William became part of Codrington's small fleet assembled to defend Nevis from the French, with whom the English were at war. The governor did not pay the sailors for their defensive service, telling them instead to take their pay from the French. Kidd and his men attacked the French island of Marie-Galante, destroying its only town and looting the area, and gathering around 2,000 pounds sterling.

Later, during the War of the Grand Alliance, on commissions from the provinces of New York and Massachusetts Bay, Kidd captured an enemy privateer off the New England coast. Shortly afterwards, he was awarded £150 for successful privateering in the Caribbean. One year later, Captain Robert Culliford, a notorious pirate, stole Kidd's ship while he was ashore at Antigua in the West Indies.

In New York City, Kidd was active in financially supporting the construction of Trinity Church, New York.

On 16 May 1691, Kidd married Sarah Bradley Cox Oort, who was still in her early twenties. She had already been twice widowed and was one of the wealthiest women in New York, based on an inheritance from her first husband.

=== Preparing his expedition ===
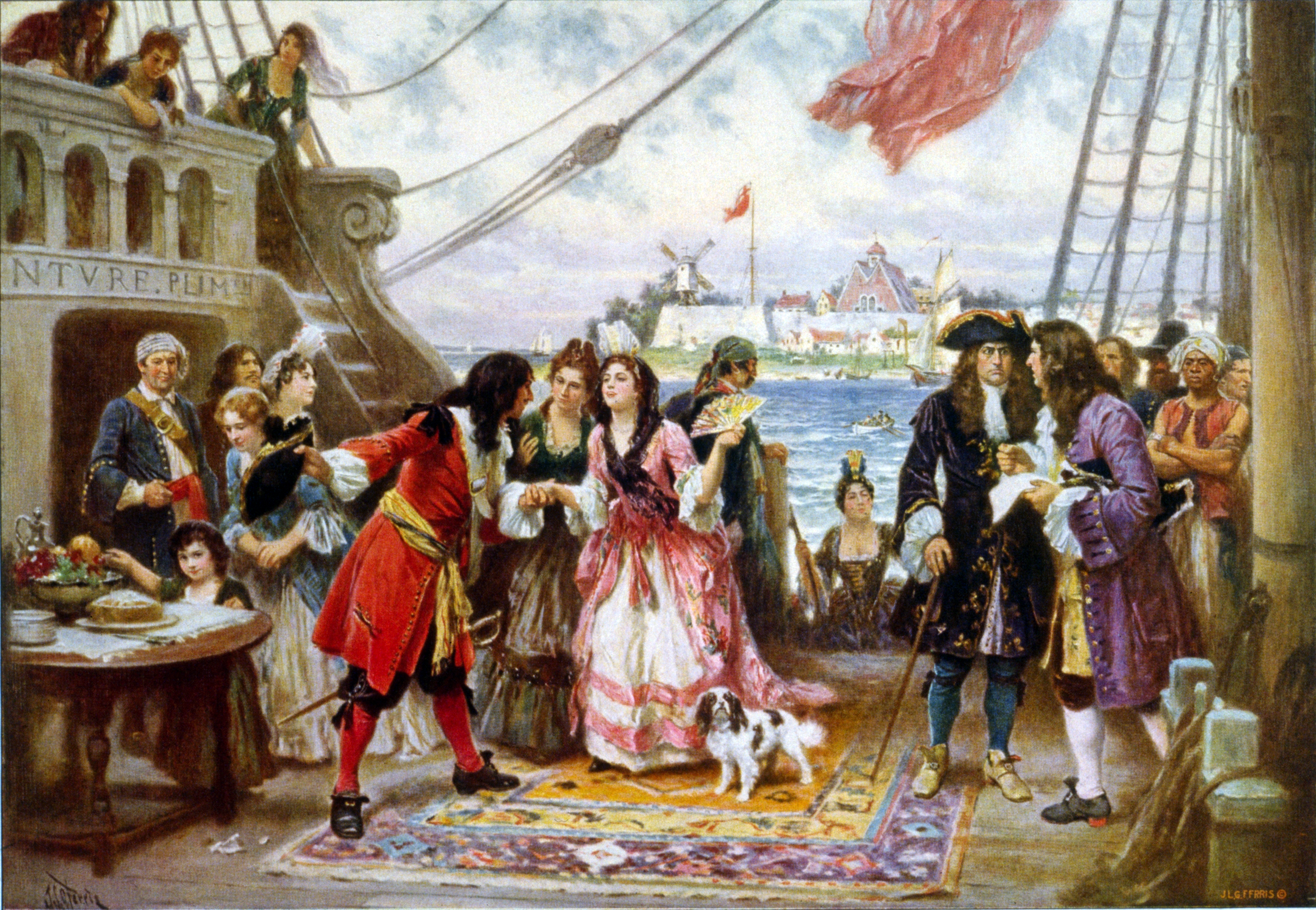
Captain Kidd in New York Harbor, in a c. 1920 painting by Jean Leon Gerome Ferris

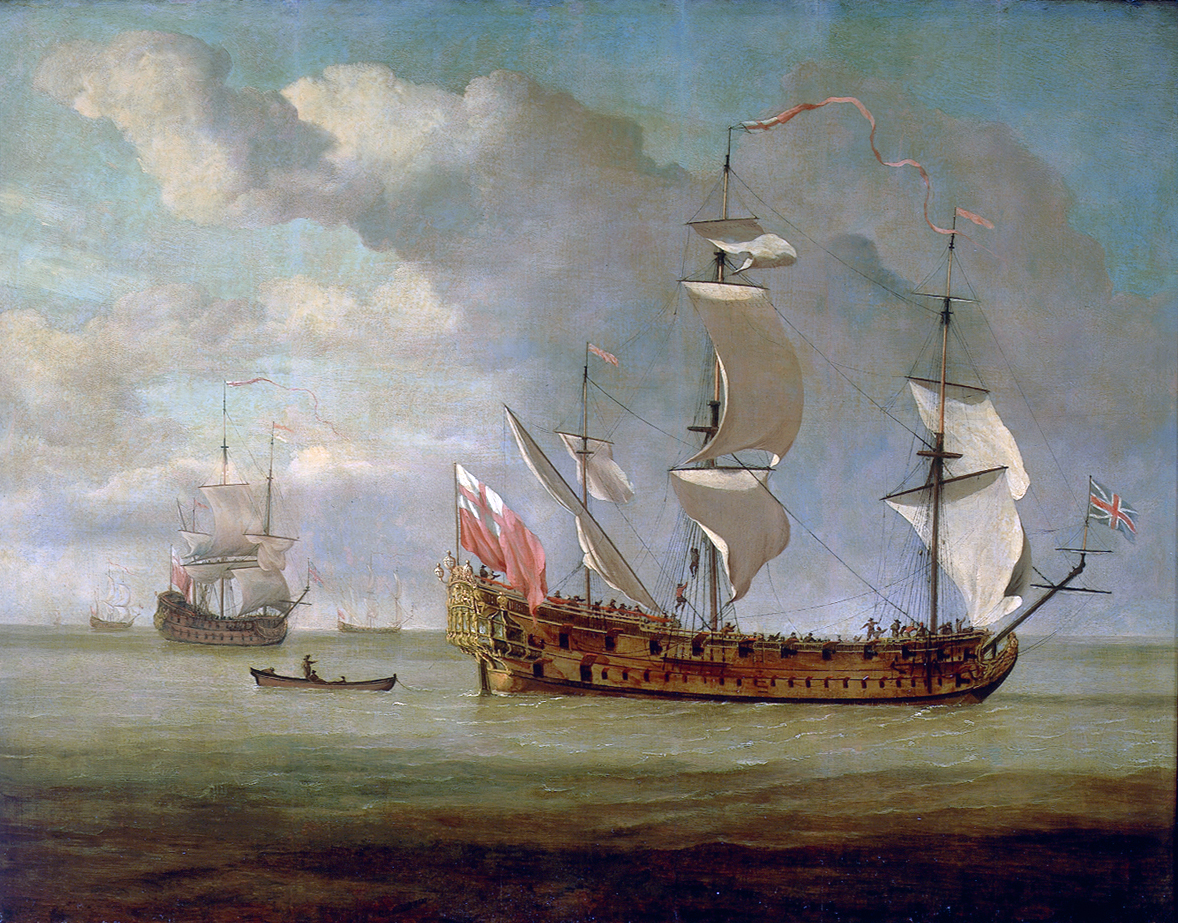
The Charles Galley, a contemporary vessel of a comparable design to Adventure Galley

On 11 December 1695, Richard Coote, 1st Earl of Bellomont, who was governing New York, Massachusetts, and New Hampshire, asked the "trusty and well beloved Captain Kidd" to attack Thomas Tew, John Ireland, Thomas Wake, William Maze, and all others who associated themselves with pirates, along with any enemy French ships. His request had the weight of the Crown behind it, and Kidd would have been considered disloyal, carrying much social stigma, to refuse Bellomont. This request preceded the voyage that contributed to Kidd's reputation as a pirate and marked his image in history and folklore.

Four-fifths of the cost for the 1696 venture was paid by peers of the realm, who were among the most powerful men in England: the Earl of Orford, the Baron of Romney, the Duke of Shrewsbury, and Sir John Somers. Kidd was presented with a letter of marque, signed personally by King William III of England, which authorised him as a privateer. This letter reserved 10% of the loot for the Crown, and Henry Gilbert's The Book of Pirates suggests that the King fronted some of the money for the voyage himself. Kidd and his acquaintance Colonel Robert Livingston orchestrated the whole plan; they sought additional funding from merchant Sir Richard Blackham. Kidd also had to sell his ship Antigua to raise funds.

The new ship, Adventure Galley, was well suited to the task of catching pirates, weighing over 284 tons burthen and equipped with 34 cannon, oars, and 150 men. The oars were a key advantage, as they enabled Adventure Galley to manoeuvre in a battle when the winds had calmed and other ships were dead in the water. Kidd took pride in personally selecting the crew, choosing only those whom he deemed to be the best and most loyal officers.

As the Adventure Galley sailed down the Thames, Kidd unaccountably failed to salute a Navy yacht at Greenwich, as custom dictated. The Navy yacht then fired a shot to make him show respect, and Kidd's crew responded with an astounding display of impudence – by turning and slapping their backsides in [disdain].

Because of Kidd's refusal to salute, the Navy vessel's captain retaliated by pressing much of Kidd's crew into naval service, despite the captain's strong protests and the general exclusion of privateer crew from such action. Short-handed, Kidd sailed for New York City, capturing a French vessel en route (which was legal under the terms of his commission). To make up for the lack of officers, Kidd picked up replacement crew in New York, the vast majority of whom were known and hardened criminals, some likely former pirates.

Among Kidd's officers was quartermaster Hendrick van der Heul. The quartermaster was considered "second in command" to the captain in pirate culture of this era. It is not clear, however, if Van der Heul exercised this degree of responsibility because Kidd was authorised as a privateer. Van der Heul may have been African or of Dutch descent. A contemporary source describes him as a "small black Man". If Van der Heul was of African ancestry, he would be considered the highest-ranking black pirate or privateer so far identified. Van der Heul later became a master's mate on a merchant vessel and was never convicted of piracy.

=== Hunting for pirates ===
In September 1696, Kidd weighed anchor and set course for the Cape of Good Hope in southern Africa. A third of his crew died on the Comoros due to an outbreak of cholera, the brand-new ship developed many leaks, and he failed to find the pirates whom he expected to encounter off Madagascar.

With his ambitious enterprise failing, Kidd became desperate to cover its costs. Yet he failed to attack several ships when given a chance, including a Dutchman and a New York privateer. Both were out of bounds of his commission. The latter would have been considered out of bounds because New York was part of the territories of the Crown, and Kidd was authorised in part by the New York governor. Some of the crew deserted Kidd the next time that Adventure Galley anchored offshore. Those who decided to stay on made constant open threats of mutiny.

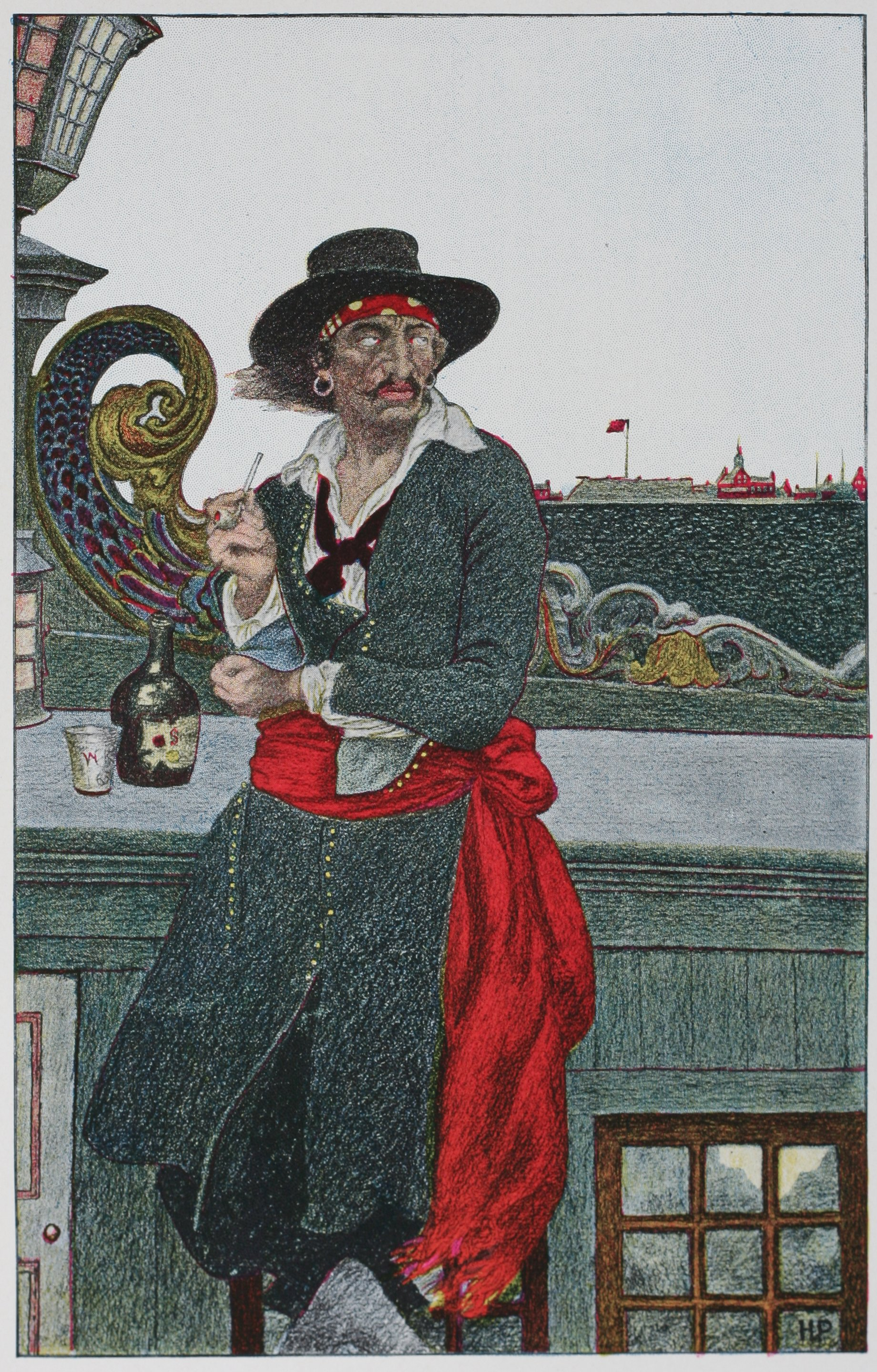
Howard Pyle's painting of Kidd in New York Harbor

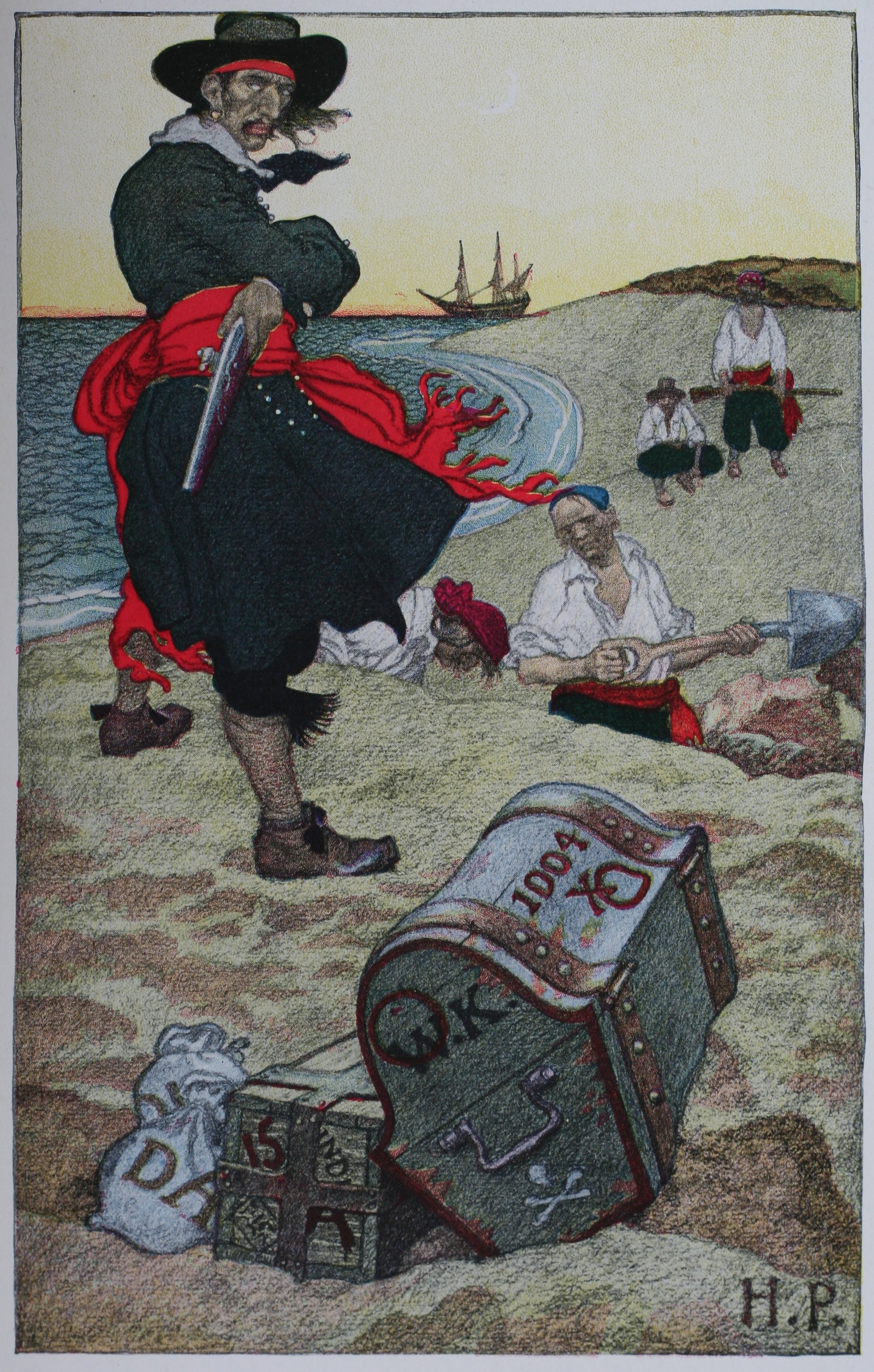
Pyle's painting of Kidd burying treasure

Kidd killed one of his own crewmen on 30 October 1697. Kidd's gunner William Moore was on deck sharpening a chisel when a Dutch ship appeared. Moore urged Kidd to attack the Dutchman, an act that would have been considered piratical, since the nation was not at war with England, but also certain to anger Dutch-born King William. Kidd refused, calling Moore a lousy dog. Moore retorted, "If I am a lousy dog, you have made me so; you have brought me to ruin and many more." Kidd reportedly dropped an ironbound bucket on Moore, fracturing his skull. Moore died the following day.

Seventeenth-century English admiralty law allowed captains great leeway in using violence against their crew, but killing was not permitted. Kidd said to his ship's surgeon that he had "good friends in England, that will bring me off for that".

=== Accusations of piracy ===
Escaped prisoners told stories of being hoisted up by the arms and "drubbed" (thrashed) with a drawn cutlass by Kidd. On one occasion, crew members sacked the trading ship Mary and tortured several of its crew members while Kidd and the other captain, Thomas Parker, conversed privately in Kidd's cabin.

Kidd was declared a pirate very early in his voyage by a Royal Navy officer, to whom he had promised "thirty men or so". Kidd sailed away during the night to preserve his crew, rather than subject them to Royal Navy impressment. The letter of marque was intended to protect a privateer's crew from such impressment.

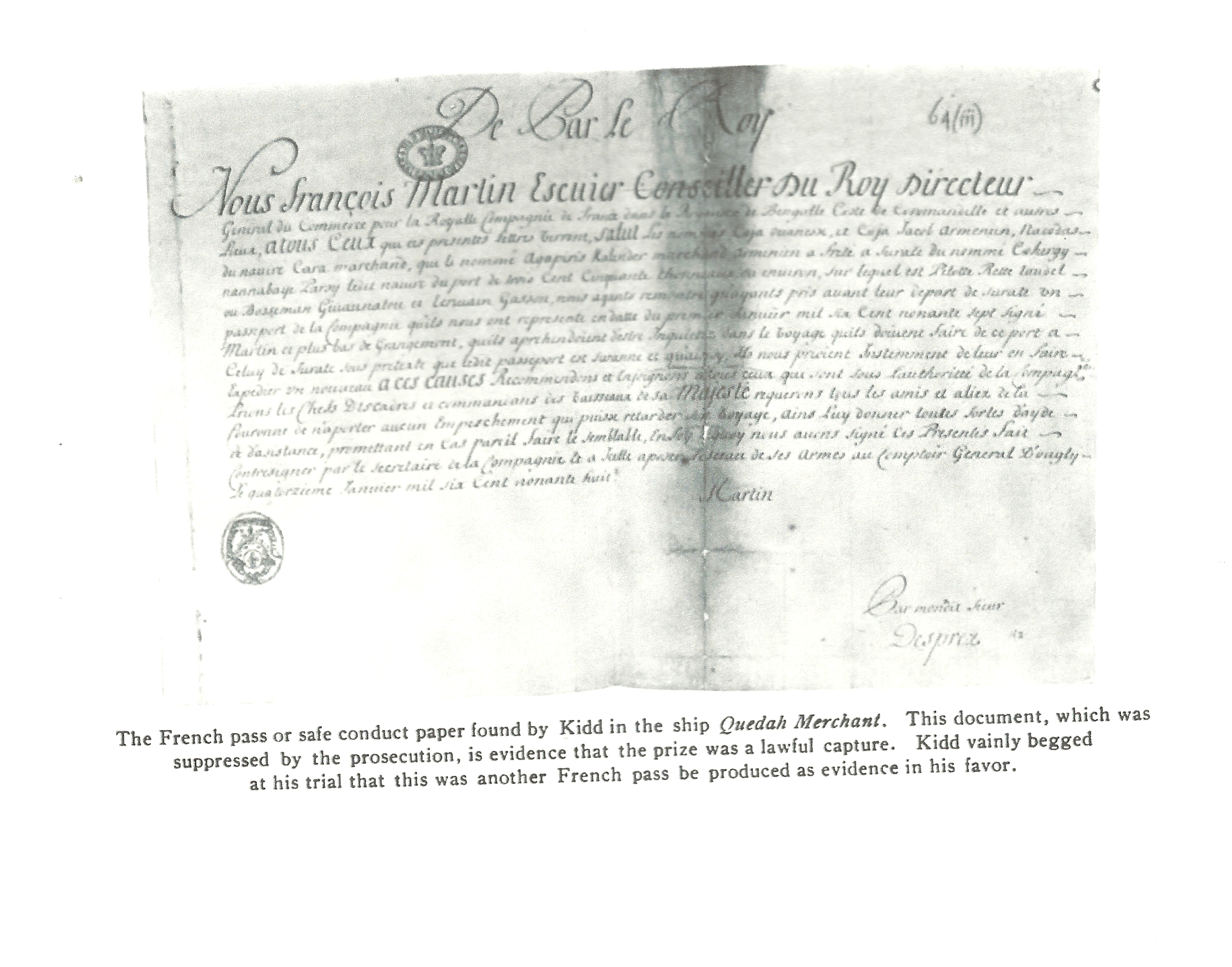
The French pass from the "Quedagh Merchant"

On 30 January 1698, Kidd raised French colours and took his greatest prize, the 400-ton Quedagh Merchant, an Indian ship hired by Armenian merchants. It was loaded with satins, muslins, gold, silver, and a variety of East Indian merchandise, as well as extremely valuable silks. The captain of Quedagh Merchant was an Englishman named Wright, who had purchased passes from the French East India Company promising him the protection of the French Crown.

When news of his capture of this ship reached England, however, officials classified Kidd as a pirate. Various naval commanders were ordered to "pursue and seize the said Kidd and his accomplices" for the "notorious piracies" they had committed.

Kidd kept the French sea passes of the Quedagh Merchant, as well as the vessel itself. British admiralty and vice-admiralty courts (especially in North America) previously had often winked at privateers' excesses amounting to piracy. Kidd might have hoped that the passes would provide the legal fig leaf that would allow him to keep Quedagh Merchant and her cargo. Renaming the seized merchantman as Adventure Prize, he set sail for Madagascar.

On 1 April 1698, Kidd reached Madagascar. After meeting privately with trader Tempest Rogers (who would later be accused of trading and selling Kidd's looted East India goods), he found the first pirate of his voyage, Robert Culliford (the same man who had stolen Kidd's ship at Antigua years before) and his crew aboard Mocha Frigate.

Two contradictory accounts exist of how Kidd proceeded. According to A General History of the Pyrates, published more than 25 years after the event by an author whose identity is disputed by historians, Kidd made peaceful overtures to Culliford: he "drank their Captain's health", swearing that "he was in every respect their Brother", and gave Culliford "a Present of an Anchor and some Guns". This account appears to be based on the testimony of Kidd's crewmen Joseph Palmer and Robert Bradinham at his trial.

The other version was presented by Richard Zacks in his 2002 book The Pirate Hunter: The True Story of Captain Kidd. According to Zacks, Kidd was unaware that Culliford had only about 20 crew with him, and felt ill-manned and ill-equipped to take Mocha Frigate until his two prize ships and crews arrived. He decided to leave Culliford alone until these reinforcements arrived. After Adventure Prize and Rouparelle reached port, Kidd ordered his crew to attack Culliford's Mocha Frigate. However, his crew refused to attack Culliford and threatened instead to shoot Kidd. Zacks does not refer to any source for his version of events.

Both accounts agree that most of Kidd's men abandoned him for Culliford. Only 13 remained with Adventure Galley. Deciding to return home, Kidd left the Adventure Galley behind, ordering her to be burnt because she had become worm-eaten and leaky. Before burning the ship, he salvaged every last scrap of metal, such as hinges. With the loyal remnant of his crew, he returned to the Caribbean aboard the Adventure Prize, stopping first at St. Augustine's Bay for repairs. Some of his crew later returned to North America on their own as passengers aboard Giles Shelley's ship Nassau.

The 1698 Act of Grace, which offered a royal pardon to pirates in the Indian Ocean, specifically exempted Kidd (and Henry Every) from receiving a pardon, in Kidd's case due to his association with prominent Whig statesmen. Kidd became aware both that he was wanted and that he could not make use of the Act of Grace upon his arrival in Anguilla, his first port of call since St. Augustine's Bay.

=== Trial and execution ===
Prior to returning to New York City, Kidd knew that he was wanted as a pirate and that several English men-of-war were searching for him. Realising that his ship the Adventure Prize was a marked vessel, he cached it in the Caribbean Sea, sold off his remaining plundered goods through pirate and fence William Burke, and continued towards New York aboard a sloop. He deposited some of his treasure on Gardiners Island, hoping to use his knowledge of its location as a bargaining tool. Kidd landed in Oyster Bay to avoid mutinous crew who had gathered in New York City. To avoid them, Kidd sailed 120 nautical miles (220 km; 140 mi) around the eastern tip of Long Island, and doubled back 90 nautical miles (170 km; 100 mi) along the Sound to Oyster Bay. He felt this was a safer passage than the highly trafficked Narrows between Staten Island and Brooklyn.

New York Governor Bellomont, also an investor, was away in Boston, Massachusetts. Aware of the accusations against Kidd, Bellomont was afraid of being implicated in piracy himself and believed that presenting Kidd to England in chains was his best chance to survive. He lured Kidd into Boston with false promises of clemency, and ordered him arrested on 6 July 1699. Kidd was placed in Stone Prison, spending most of the time in solitary confinement. His wife, Sarah, was also arrested and imprisoned. They were separated and she never saw him again.

The conditions of Kidd's imprisonment were extremely harsh, and were said to have driven him at least temporarily insane. By then, Bellomont had turned against Kidd and other pirates, writing that the inhabitants of Long Island were "a lawless and unruly people" protecting pirates who had "settled among them".

The civil government had changed and the new Tory ministry hoped to use Kidd as a tool to discredit the Whigs who had backed him, but Kidd refused to name names, naively confident his patrons would reward his loyalty by interceding on his behalf. There is speculation that he could have been spared had he talked. Finding Kidd politically useless, the Tory leaders sent him to stand trial before the High Court of Admiralty in London, for the charges of piracy on high seas and the murder of William Moore. Whilst awaiting trial, Kidd was confined in the infamous Newgate Prison, regarded even by the standards of the day as a disgusting hellhole, and was held there for almost two years before his trial even began.

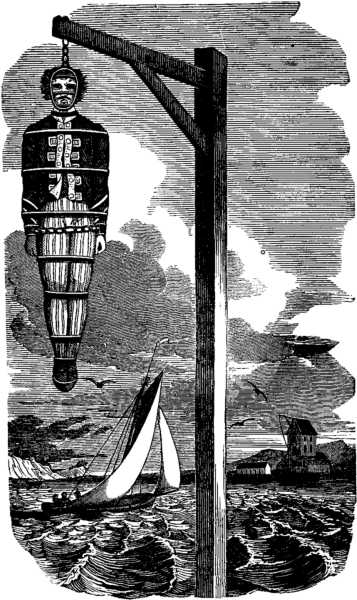
Captain Kidd, gibbeted near Tilbury in Essex, following his execution in 1701

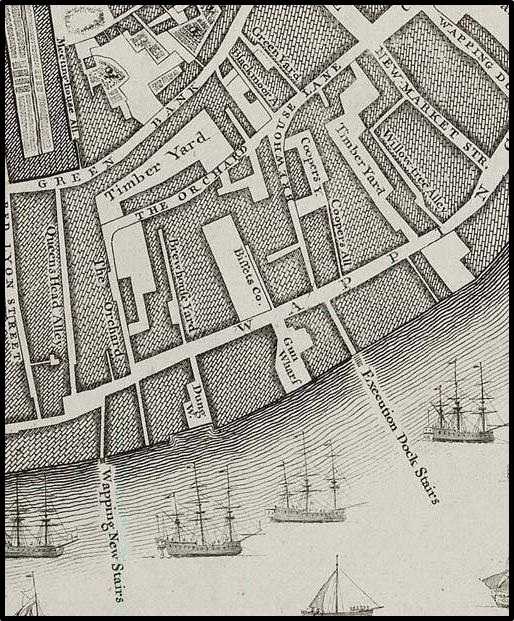
Rocque's map of 1746 showing location of Execution Dock Stairs at Wapping, east London

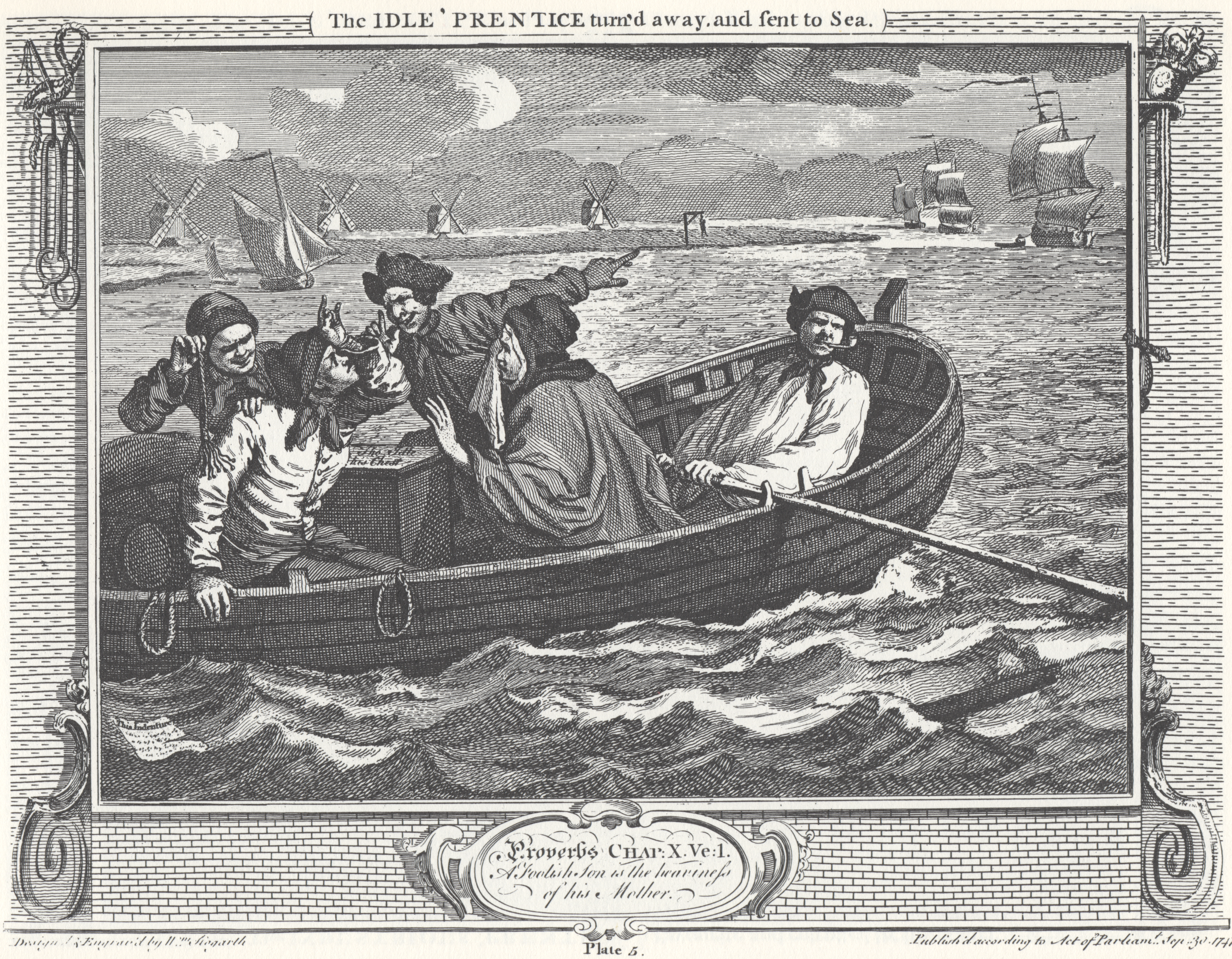
Hogarth's Idle Apprentice Tom going to sea – executed criminals on exhibit in background

Kidd had two lawyers to assist in his defence. However, the money that the Admiralty had set aside for his defence was misplaced until right before the trial's start, and he had no legal counsel until the morning that the trial started and had time for just one brief consultation with them before it began. He was shocked to learn at his trial that he was charged with murder, arguing that Moore had been fomenting mutiny and that his death was accidental. He was found guilty on all charges (murder and five counts of piracy) and sentenced to death. He was hanged on 23 May 1701, at Execution Dock, Wapping, in London. The day of his execution someone took pity on him and gave him a large amount of alcohol, enough that he arrived at the gallows thoroughly drunk. He had to be hanged twice. On the first attempt, the hangman's rope broke and Kidd survived. Although some in the crowd called for Kidd's release, claiming the breaking of the rope was a sign from God, Kidd was hanged again minutes later, and died. His body was gibbeted over the River Thames at Tilbury Point, as a warning to future would-be pirates, for three years.

Of Kidd's associates, Gabriel Loffe, Able Owens, and Hugh Parrot were also convicted of piracy. They were pardoned just prior to hanging at Execution Dock. Robert Lamley, William Jenkins and Richard Barleycorn were released.

Kidd's Whig backers were embarrassed by his trial. Far from rewarding his loyalty, they participated in the effort to convict him by depriving him of the money and information which might have provided him with some legal defence. In particular, the two sets of French passes he had kept were missing at his trial. These passes (and others dated 1700) resurfaced in the early 20th century, misfiled with other government papers in a London building. These passes confirm Kidd's version of events, and call the extent of his guilt as a pirate into question.

A broadside song, "Captain Kidd's Farewell to the Seas, or, the Famous Pirate's Lament", was printed shortly after his execution. It popularised the common belief that Kidd had confessed to the charges.

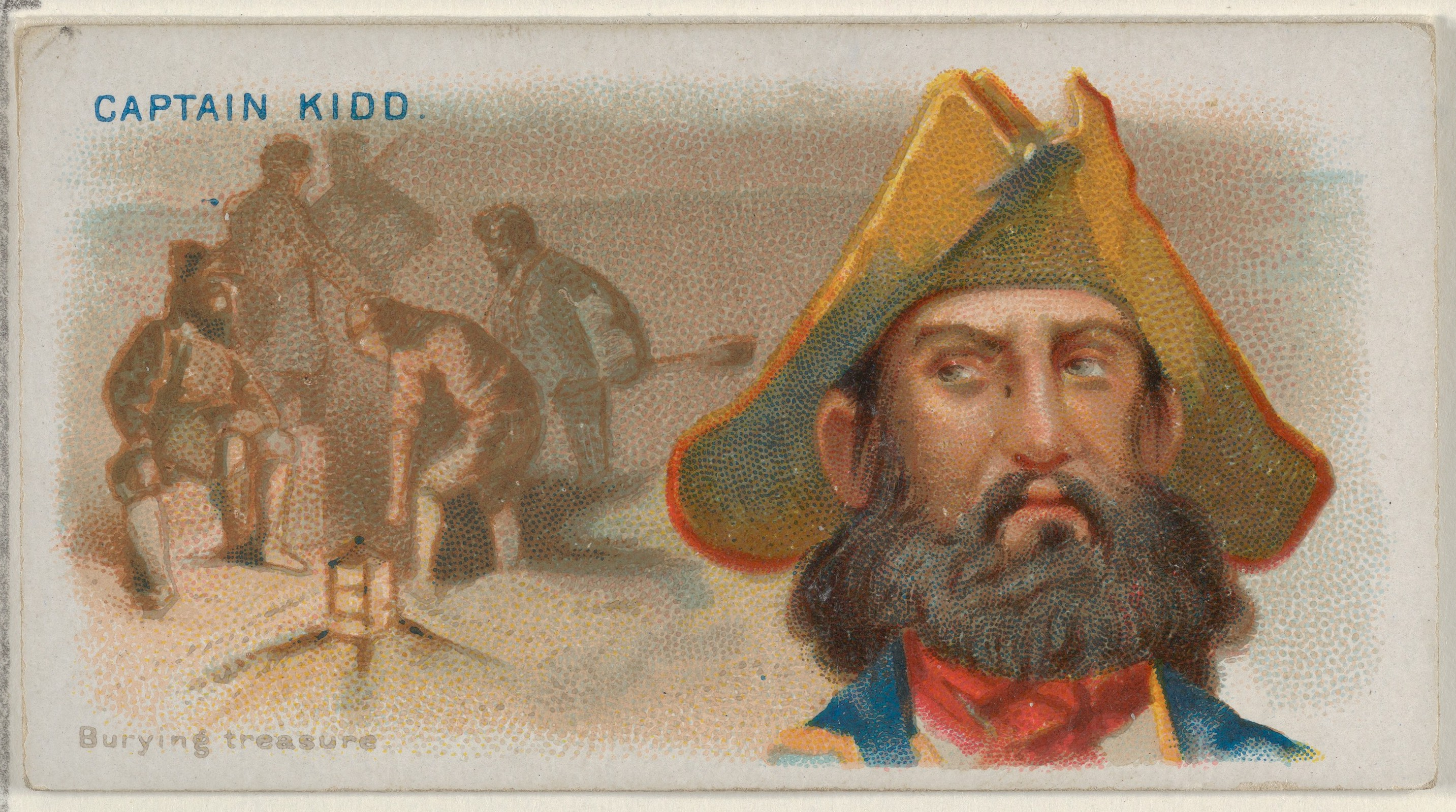
Captain Kidd, Burying Treasure, from the Pirates of the Spanish Main series (N19) for Allen & Ginter Cigarettes MET DP835020.

== Mythology and legend ==
The belief that Kidd had left buried treasure contributed greatly to the growth of his legend. The 1701 broadside song "Captain Kid's Farewell to the Seas, or, the Famous Pirate's Lament" lists "Two hundred bars of gold, and rix dollars manifold, we seized uncontrolled".

It also inspired numerous treasure hunts conducted on Oak Island in Nova Scotia; in Suffolk County, Long Island in New York where Gardiners Island is located; Charles Island in Milford, Connecticut; the Thimble Islands in Connecticut and Cockenoe Island in Westport, Connecticut.

Kidd was also alleged to have buried treasure on the Rahway River in New Jersey across the Arthur Kill from Staten Island.

Captain Kidd did bury a small cache of treasure on Gardiners Island off the eastern coast of Long Island, in a spot known as Cherry Tree Field. Governor Bellomont reportedly had it found and sent to England to be used as evidence against Kidd in his trial.

Some time in the 1690s, Kidd visited Block Island where he was supplied with provisions by Mrs. Mercy (Sands) Raymond, daughter of the mariner James Sands. It was said that before he departed, Kidd asked Mrs. Raymond to hold out her apron, which he then filled with gold and jewels as payment for her hospitality. After her husband Joshua Raymond died, Mercy moved with her family to northern New London, Connecticut (later Montville), where she purchased much land. The Raymond family was said by family acquaintances to have been "enriched by the apron".

On Grand Manan in the Bay of Fundy, as early as 1875, there were searches on the west side of the island for treasure allegedly buried by Kidd during his time as a privateer. For nearly 200 years, this remote area of the island has been called "Money Cove".

In 1983, Cork Graham and Richard Knight searched for Captain Kidd's buried treasure off the Vietnamese island of Phú Quốc. Knight and Graham were caught, convicted of illegally landing on Vietnamese territory, and each assessed a $10,000 fine. They were imprisoned for 11 months until they paid the fine.

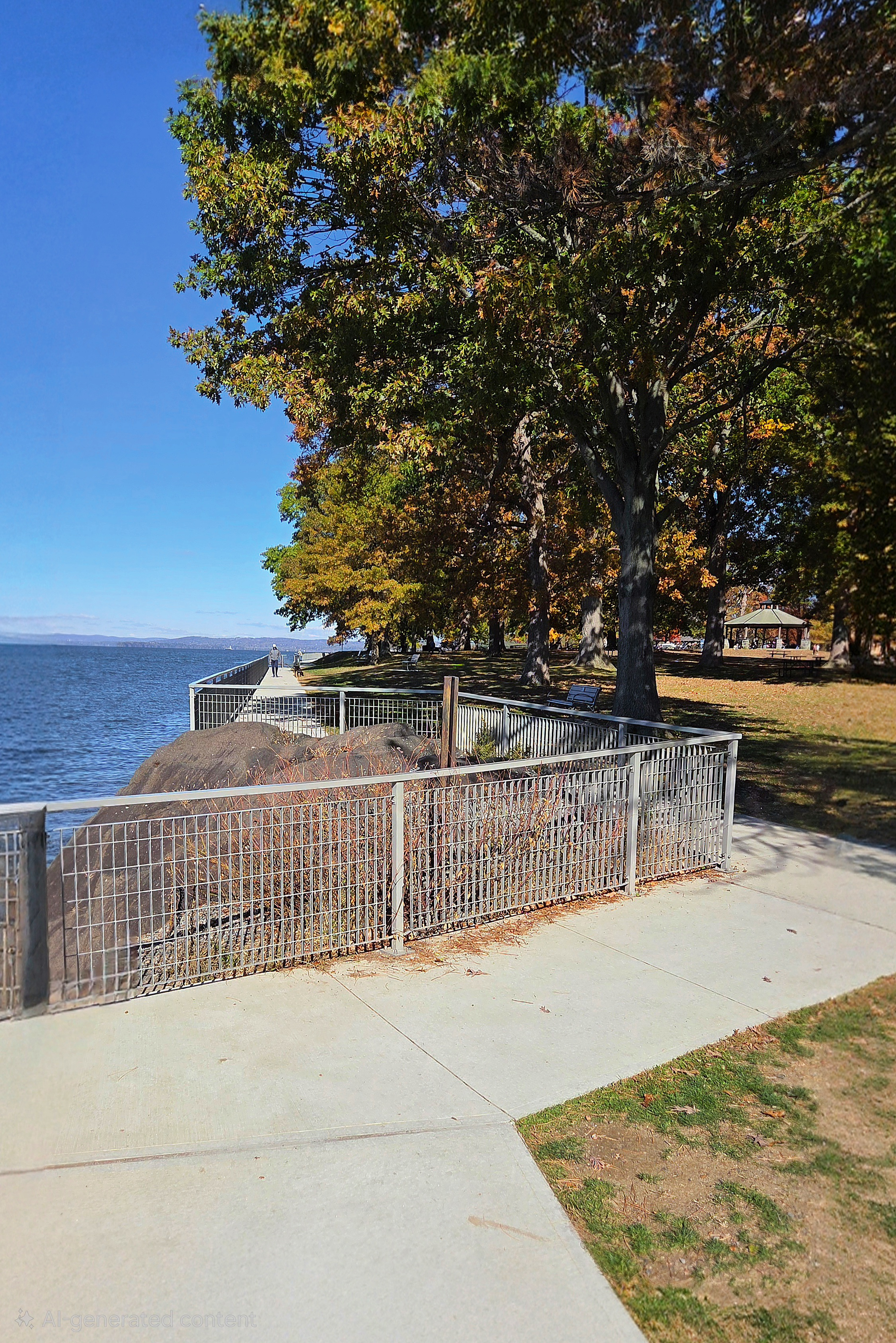
Kidd's Rock in Kingsland Point Park in Sleepy Hollow, New York

As local lore has it, the massive boulder known as Kidd's Rock near the Philipsburg Manor House (in what is now Kingsland Point Park in Sleepy Hollow, New York) was a clandestine meeting place for Frederick Philipse, the extremely wealthy lord of Philipsburg Manor, and Captain Kidd, who was allegedly a business associate of Philipse. According to Westchester County historian Stephen Jenkins, Philipse was one of the backers of Captain Kidd, and Lord Bellomont once remarked: "If the coffers of Frederick Philipse were searched, Captain Kidd's missing treasures could easily be found."

== Quedagh Merchant found ==
For years, people and treasure hunters tried to locate the Quedagh Merchant. It was reported on 13 December 2007 that "wreckage of a pirate ship abandoned by Captain Kidd in the 17th century has been found by divers in shallow waters off the Dominican Republic". The waters in which the ship was found were less than ten feet deep and were only 70 feet (21 m) off Catalina Island, just to the south of La Romana on the Dominican coast. The ship is believed to be "the remains of the Quedagh Merchant". Charles Beeker, the director of Academic Diving and Underwater Science Programs in Indiana University (Bloomington)'s School of Health, Physical Education, and Recreation, was one of the experts leading the Indiana University diving team. He said that it was "remarkable that the wreck has remained undiscovered all these years given its location", and that the ship had been the subject of so many prior failed searches. Captain Kidd's cannon, an artefact from the shipwreck, was added to a permanent exhibit at The Children's Museum of Indianapolis in 2011.

== False find ==
In May 2015, a 50-kilogram (110 lb) ingot expected to be silver was found in a wreck off the coast of Île Sainte-Marie in Madagascar by a team led by marine archaeologist Barry Clifford. It was believed to be part of Kidd's treasure. Clifford gave the booty to Hery Rajaonarimampianina, President of Madagascar. But, in July 2015, a UNESCO scientific and technical advisory body reported that testing showed the ingot consisted of 95% lead, and speculated that the wreck in question was a broken part of the Sainte-Marie port constructions.

== Portrayals in popular culture ==
=== Literature ===
- In a short story "The Devil and Tom Walker" by Washington Irving, the title character finds Kidd's treasure, hidden in a swamp near Boston, by selling his soul to the Devil. The account of Kidd's life and legends of his treasures are told in Irving's Tales of a Traveller collection's story "Kidd the Pirate".
- Edgar Allan Poe uses the legend of Kidd's buried treasure in his story "The Gold-Bug" (1843).
- In L. Frank Baum's children's fantasy The Sea Fairies (1911), the sea serpent King Anko lists Captain Kidd among the historical figures he has met over the course of his long life, and insists that the Captain's real name was Captain Kid Glove.
- The 1957 children's book Captain Kidd's Cat by Robert Lawson is a largely fictionalised account of Kidd's last voyage, trial and execution. It is told from the point of view of his loyal ship's cat. The book portrays Kidd as an innocent privateer who was framed by corrupt officials as a scapegoat for their own crimes.
- In the popular manga One Piece, Eustass "Captain" Kid is based on him.
- A fictionalised version of Captain Kidd is featured in Ghostbusters: Dead Man's Chest.

=== Film and television ===
- A "funny animal" version of Captain Kidd (John R. Gurney) antagonises Felix the Cat in the Van Beuren Studios short The Goose That Laid the Golden Egg (1936), part of the Rainbow Parade series.
- Stanley Andrews as Kidd in Captain Kidd's Treasure (Short 1938).
- Charles Laughton played Kidd twice on film: in Captain Kidd (1945) and in Abbott and Costello Meet Captain Kidd (1952).
- John Crawford played Kidd in the 1953 Columbia film serial The Great Adventures of Captain Kidd.
- Love Nystrom portrayed Kidd in the 2006 mini-series Blackbeard.
- Noah Robbins played William Benedict, a man who used the alias of Captain Kidd in the 11th episode of Season 8 of the TV series The Blacklist.

=== Music ===
- The traditional folk song "The Ballad of Captain Kidd" was popular from its publication at the time of Kidd's death, surviving in the oral tradition into the twentieth century and giving its melody to the hymn "What Wondrous Love Is This".
- The song "Ballad of William Kidd" by the heavy metal band Running Wild is based on Kidd's life, particularly the events surrounding his trial and execution.
- Canadian band Great Big Sea wrote and recorded the ballad "Captain Kidd". It is a sea shanty with many historically accurate allusions to the life of William Kidd.
- He is mentioned in "The Land of Make Believe" by Bucks Fizz.
- He is mentioned in Relient K's rendition of "The Pirates Who Don't Do Anything"
- Bob Dylan used Captain Kidd in the lyrics to "Bob Dylan's 115th Dream".

=== Video games ===
- In Persona 5 and its related titles, Captain Kidd is the Persona of party member Ryuji Sakamoto, which appears as a skeleton dressed as a stylised pirate riding a ship. Likewise, Ryuji's Third-Tier Persona is called William and has a sci-fi motif mixed with pirates.
- In Assassin's Creed III, one of the series of side missions involves finding William Kidd's treasure by handing trinkets over for locations where each piece of a treasure map of Kidd's treasure is.
- In Assassin's Creed IV: Black Flag, Mary Read, in order to facilitate her career as a pirate, poses as James Kidd, an illegitimate son of the late William Kidd.
- In Mario & Sonic at the London 2012 Olympic Games, The Phantasmal Fog, located alongside the fog urn at an ancient ruin site, was stolen around 300 years ago by William Kidd, using a magical seal to keep the fog within the urn.
- In World Heroes, Captain Kidd is one of the games playable characters, a pirate who plunders from the rich and he possesses a super move where he hangs the opponent with rope, a reference to his own execution.

== See also ==
- Joseph Bradish, a pirate who sailed in Kidd's company
- George Dew, pirate, and privateer who briefly sailed with Kidd in 1691 near the Piscataqua River.
- Piracy in Scotland
- Treasure Island
