= Catalina Island (Dominican Republic) =

Tropical island in the Caribbean Sea

Catalina Island, La Romana
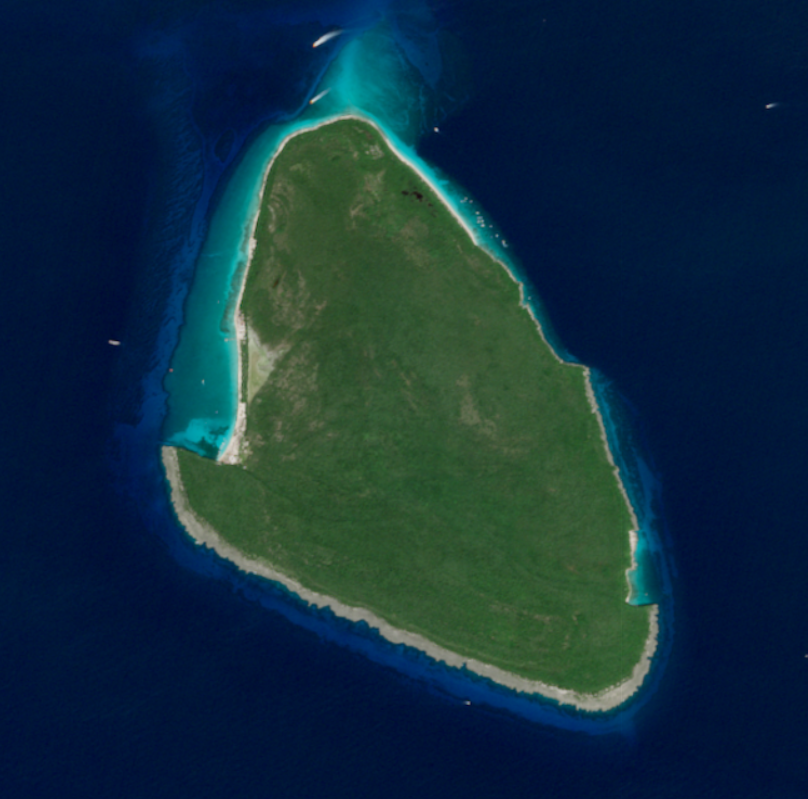
- Catalina Island in 2025

- Location within the Dominican Republic

Geography
- Coordinates: 18°21′36″N 69°00′17″W
- Area: 9.6 km^{2} (3.7 sq mi)
- Length: 4.5 km (2.8 mi)
- Width: 3.0 km (1.86 mi)
- Highest elevation: 60 ft (18 m)

Administration
- Dominican Republic
- Province: La Romana

Catalina Island or Isla Catalina is a tropical island in the Caribbean Sea located 2.4 kilometres (1.5 mi) from the mainland on the south-east corner of the Dominican Republic, near the provinces of La Altagracia and La Romana. It is an occasional destination for cruise ships on Caribbean routes. In particular, Costa Cruises has a private beach on the island. Their ships anchor offshore and transport passengers to shore via tender.

== Geography ==
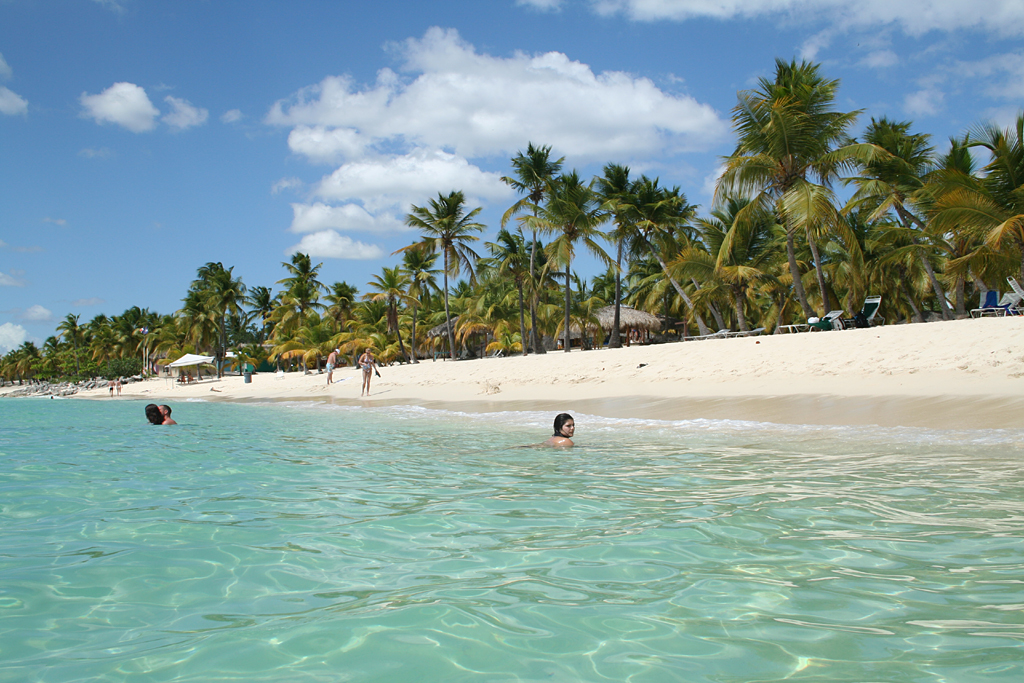
A beach on Catalina Island

The island itself is only 9.6 square kilometres (3.7 sq mi) in size, and is a diverse preservation of ecosystems including sand dunes, mangroves, and reefs. Formed out of coral stone, the island contains three overlapping plateaus. The highest elevation on the island is only 18 metres (60 ft) above sea level. The seas around the Island are rich in wildlife, with many species of birds and tropical marine fish, and there are large areas where natural sandbars offshore bring the depth to just a few feet.

== History ==
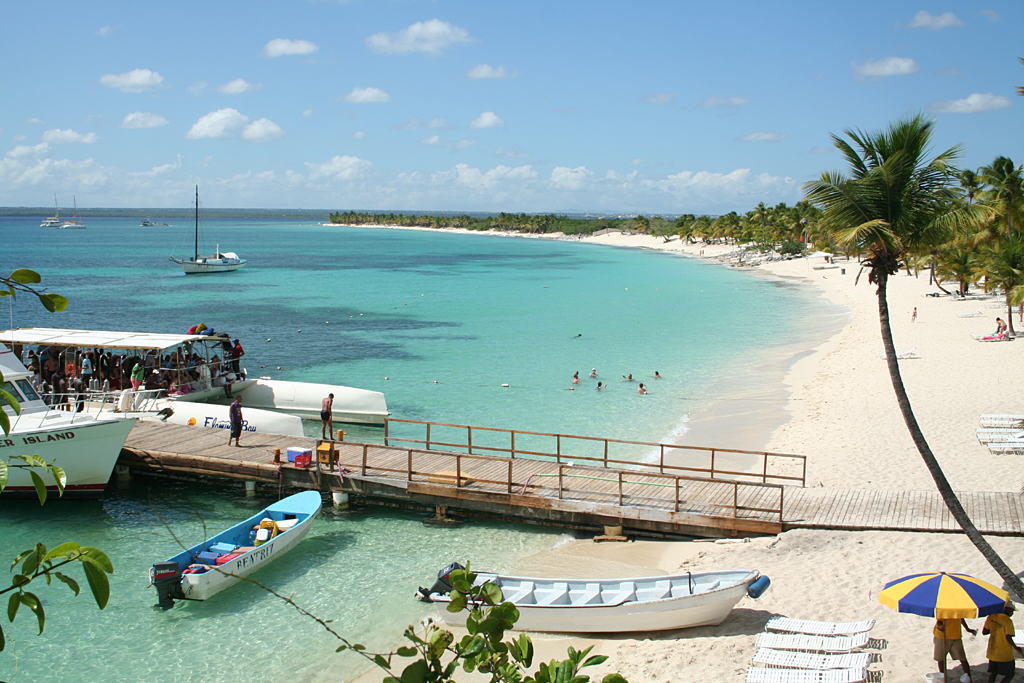
Catalina Island

The island was named "Santa Catalina" by Christopher Columbus, who visited it in May 1494.

=== William Kidd's Quedagh Merchant ===
On December 13, 2007, the shipwreck of a 17th-century merchant vessel was found at a depth of three metres (9.8 ft) roughly 70 metres (230 ft) offshore. It has since been identified as the pirate Captain William Kidd's 1699 ship Quedagh Merchant. The vessel was also known as Cara Merchant according to Kidd's original testimony during his trial prior to his hanging on May 23, 1701. A team of researchers from Indiana University first discovered the wreckage in 2007 and have since established a Marine Protected Area in an attempt to preserve both the archaeological remains of the shipwreck and its surrounding reef ecosystem. The famed shipwreck has been nominated as a Living Museum in the Sea. Living Museums in the Sea is a program with the goal of protecting submerged cultural and biological resources around the world.

In a partnership with the Children's Museum of Indianapolis and the Oficina Nacional de Patrimonio Cultural Subacuático (ONPCS), Indiana University recovered one of the 26 cannons found on the wreckage of Quedagh Merchant. The cannon is now on display at the "National Geographic: Treasures of the Earth" exhibit in Indianapolis, United States. At the Children's Museum of Indianapolis, Indiana University students teach visitors about Quedagh Merchant as well as the history of the country, maritime history, artifact conservation, and archaeology.

== See also ==
- Saona Island
