= Adventure Galley =

English sailing ship captained by William Kidd

History

England
- Name: Adventure Galley
- Builder: William Castle, Deptford?
- Cost: 8,000 pounds sterling
- Launched: 4 December 1695
- Fate: Sunk, April 1698

General characteristics
- Class & type: oared frigate
- Tons burthen: 287
- Length: 124 ft (38 m) (keel)
- Beam: 28 ft (8.5 m)
- Draught: 9 ft (2.7 m)
- Propulsion: Sails, one bank of oars
- Sail plan: Ship rig
- Speed: 14 knots (16 mph; 26 km/h) under full sail; 3 knots (3.5 mph; 5.6 km/h) under oar, without wind
- Complement: 160 men
- Armament: 34 light cannon

Adventure Galley, also known as Adventure, was an English merchant ship captained by Scottish sea captain William Kidd. She was a type of hybrid ship that combined square rigged sails with oars to give her manoeuvrability in both windy and calm conditions. The vessel was launched at the end of 1695 and was acquired by Kidd the following year to serve in his privateering venture. Between April 1696 and April 1698, she travelled thousands of miles across the Atlantic and Indian Oceans in search of pirates but failed to find any until nearly the end of her travels. Instead, Kidd himself turned pirate in desperation at not having obtained any prizes. Adventure Galley succeeded in capturing two vessels off India and brought them back to Madagascar, but by the spring of 1698 the ship's hull had become so rotten and leaky that she was no longer seaworthy. She was stripped of anything movable and sunk off the north-eastern coast of Madagascar. Her remains have not yet been located.

== Design and purchase ==
The vessel was acquired for Kidd by a consortium of investors who backed a scheme to hunt down pirates, recover their booty and redistribute it among the investors. He had enlisted the support of Richard Coote, 1st Earl of Bellomont and governor-general of the British Province of New York and the ambitious Robert Livingston the Younger, who later became the mayor of Albany, New York. With Coote's backing, Kidd obtained a commission from King William III to operate as a privateer. The other investors who came aboard the scheme after it met with the king's approval were the Earl of Oxford, the Earl of Romney, the Duke of Shrewsbury, the Lord Chancellor, Sir Edmund Harrison and John Somers. The king himself was not an investor but was nonetheless entitled to one tenth of the proceeds.

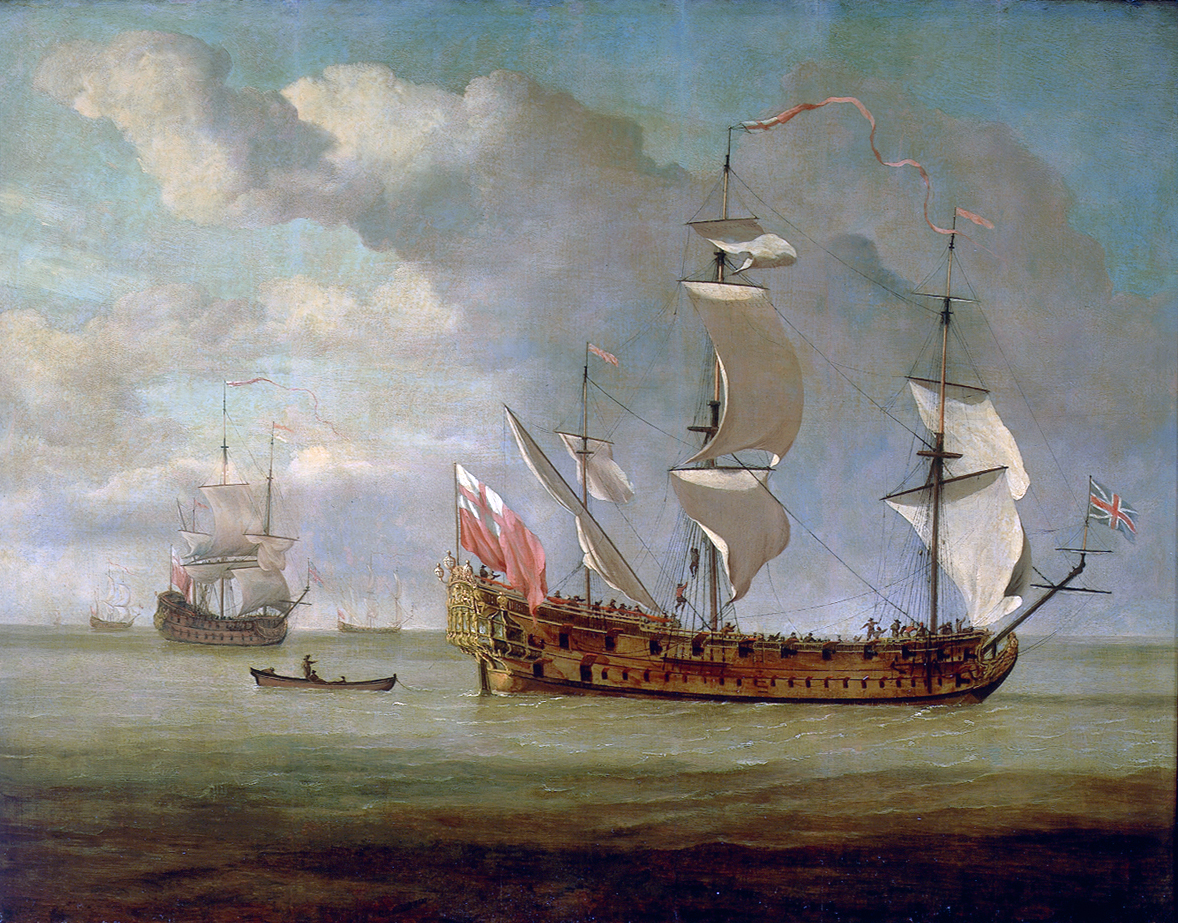
The Charles Galley, a contemporary vessel of a comparable design to Adventure Galley

The vessel was purchased for £8,000 (£968,571 today) in August 1696. She had been launched on 4 December 1695 from Captain William Castle's dockyard in Deptford on the outskirts of London. Her design combined sails and oars, an unusual combination for warships at that time, that incorporated three ship-rigged masts and two banks of oars. This allowed her to make 14 knots (26 km/h; 16 mph) under full sail and 3 knots (5.6 km/h; 3.5 mph) under oar. Although rowing was slow it enabled the ship to manoeuvre against the wind, or in calm conditions where other vessels that relied on sails alone could not make any progress. A number of British warships had been built to similar designs following the lessons learned from the wars against the Barbary pirates of North Africa, whose galleys had proved formidable opponents, and trading companies such as the East India Company (EIC) also built oared frigates. Castle's yard, where Adventure Galley was built, was one of the largest private shipyards in England and was a supplier of vessels to the EIC.

Adventure Galley was well-armed with a complement of 32 guns (saker or light cannon). It is not clear whether she was in fact a new vessel or had originally been intended for the navy; she may have been a commercial vessel under refit at Castle's yard before she was acquired by Kidd's consortium. She does not appear to have been particularly well-built, to judge from the problems that Kidd faced with her seaworthiness during her short career in his service. It was not uncommon for shipyards to cut corners and use sub-standard materials, and to pocket the difference in costs as extra profit. Although no picture has survived of Adventure Galley, HMS Charles Galley, which was recorded in contemporary paintings, provides a good example of how the English adapted the oared frigate design for warfare.

== Voyages of Adventure Galley ==
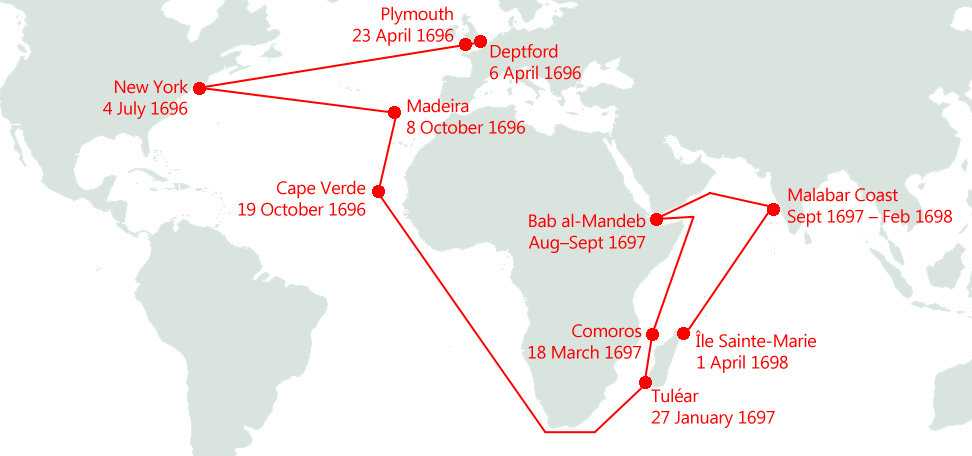
Map of Adventure Galley's voyages

After leaving Deptford on 6 April 1696, Kidd brought Adventure Galley along the coast to Plymouth in south-western England. He set sail from there on 23 April, bound for New York, and reached the city around 4 July. The ship was accompanied by a French fishing vessel that Kidd captured during the Atlantic crossing. He had the French boat condemned in New York as prize, and recruited more crewmen and set sail again on 6 September, heading for the Indian Ocean. Adventure Galley called at Madeira (reached on 8 October) and Boa Vista, Cape Verde (on 19 October) to pick up supplies en route. The long voyage down the western coast of Africa and around the Cape of Good Hope took the rest of the year and it was not until 27 January 1697 that Adventure Galley made landfall at Tuléar (now Toliara), Madagascar.

By this time Adventure Galley was in need of fresh sail and rigging. The fact that the ship's existing supplies had barely lasted eight months suggests that the dockyard may have installed substandard equipment. After staying a month in Tuléar, Adventure Galley sailed on to Johanna (now Anjouan) in the Comoros on 18 March, where East India Company ships often refitted. However, Kidd was unable to obtain credit from local merchants to buy new rigging or sails, and chose instead to take Adventure Galley to another island – either Mayotte or Mohéli – for careening, to clean her hull of encrusted barnacles and weeds. This was accomplished successfully over the course of a month but up to a third of her crew died in an outbreak of an epidemic disease, possibly malaria or yellow fever. Kidd sailed back to Johanna to find replacement crewmen and this time was able to raise the credit for new sails and rigging.

According to Kidd's testimony, he "steered for India" on 25 April 1697. By now he was a year out of London and had no prize money to show for his efforts. He had failed to find any pirates and turned his own hand to piracy. Adventure Galley did not go immediately to India but travelled to the Bab el-Mandeb strait at the mouth of the Red Sea, where she is said to have unsuccessfully tried to attack a Mughal convoy. In September 1697, Adventure Galley arrived on the Malabar Coast of India, where Kidd finally managed to capture two ships travelling under French passes – a pair of merchantmen, Rouparelle and Quedah Merchant. Unfortunately for Kidd, the latter ship was captained by an Englishman and when news of her capture reached London he was publicly condemned as a pirate.

Adventure Galley's next and final stage of her voyage took her to the Île Sainte-Marie, a pirate haven off the north-east coast of Madagascar. By now, according to Kidd's narrative, "his gally [sic] was very leaky", probably because of a rotten hull. The ship arrived there about 1 April, accompanied by the Rouparelle (renamed November) and Quedah Merchant (renamed Adventure Prize). On arrival, most of the crew promptly deserted to another pirate captain, Robert Culliford and sank November. Kidd was left with only thirteen men to crew Adventure Prize and the now-unseaworthy Adventure Galley. According to one of her crew, William Jenkins, after the rest of the crew had deserted Kidd "run Adventure Galley on shoar in Madagascar. They stript her furnishings and set her on fire to get her iron worke." This is contradicted by Kidd's own account, which stated that his skeleton crew "could not keep the galley from sinking, and went on board of the prize [i.e. Quedah Merchant]."

No more is currently known about the ship's fate and last position. The Discovery Channel commissioned Barry Clifford, a well-known underwater explorer, to find Adventure Galley as part of its "Quest" series in 1999–2000. He identified what were believed to be the wrecks of Adventure Galley and Rouparelle/November, as well as Culliford's Mocha Frigate, William Condon's Flying Dragon and Captain Chivers' New Soldado. Excavations recovered timbers made from English oak and a few scanty artifacts which were identified by Clifford as coming from Adventure Galley. In 2015, Clifford recovered a 50 kilograms (110 lb) metal bar from the site, which was marked with the letters S and T and was claimed to be made of silver. The accuracy of Clifford's conclusions about the wrecks remain debated in the scientific community. A UNESCO expert team subsequently rejected Clifford's conclusions, declaring the apparent shipwreck site to be only a broken part of the port constructions and identifying the metal bar as being 95% lead and probably a piece of ballast.

== Bibliography ==
- Donnelly, Mark P.; Diehl, Daniel (2010). Pirates of New Jersey: Plunder and High Adventure on the Garden State Coastline. Stackpole Books. ISBN 9780811706674.
- Fumerton, Patricia (2006). Unsettled: The Culture of Mobility and the Working Poor in Early Modern England. University of Chicago Press. ISBN 9780226269566.
- Graham, Harris (2002). Treasure and Intrigue: The Legacy of Captain Kidd. Dundurn Press Ltd. ISBN 978-1-55002-409-8.
- Lane, Kris E. (1996). Pillaging the Empire: Piracy in the Americas, 1500 – 1750. M.E. Sharpe. ISBN 9780765630834.
- Paine, Lincoln P. (2000). Warships of the World to 1900. Houghton Mifflin Harcourt. ISBN 9780547561707.
- Thompson, Harold William (1979). Body, Boots, and Britches: Folktales, Ballads and Speech from Country New York. Syracuse University Press. ISBN 9780815601609.
- "Kidd's Narrative". The New England Historical and Genealogical Register, Volume 6. New England Historic Genealogical Society. January 1852.
- "Mission to Madagascar". UNESCO Scientific and Technical Advisory Body assists Madagascar. Archived from the original on 17 July 2015.
