= Richard Frowd =

18th century pirate

- Years active: 1718–1719
- Piratical career
- Type: Pirate
- Base of operations: Caribbean
- Commands: 8-gun 60-man brigantine

Richard Frowd (fl. 1718–1719) was a pirate active in the Caribbean. He is best known for sailing with William Moody. He was one of a number of pirates to have both white and black sailors in his crew.

== History ==
Frowd was in the Caribbean in his 8-gun 60-man brigantine alongside Englishman William Moody’s 36-gun 130-man Rising Sun and another ship in 1718. There they captured several ships near St. Christopher’s, looting some and burning others, continuing through early 1719 after resupplying at St. Thomas in December. Their aggression prompted Governor Hamilton to request assignment of a warship from England for protection. Frowd acted as a ship’s tender to Moody’s Rising Sun but also took ships on his own, including a pink from Belfast near the Carolinas in January 1719.

After cruising the Caribbean for a time, Moody sailed for the coast of Africa. Near Cape Verde around April 1719 Moody and his supporters marooned Thomas Cocklyn, and were themselves in turn forced off the Rising Sun and into a small boat, and were presumed to have been lost at sea. Frowd may have parted ways from Moody before crossing the Atlantic, or have been replaced as captain of Moody’s consort ship by that time: records of the incident with Cocklyn and the Rising Sun (from the testimony of captured sailor William Snelgrave) mention several pirates by name but Frowd was not among them.

A number of pirates allowed blacks to serve on board their ships, though there is no general agreement on whether they were equal to white crewmen or had lesser status. Edward England, Bartholomew Roberts, Augustin Blanco, Moody, Frowd, and others were reported with mixed crews; Frowd's was described as "60 men, whites and blacks".

== See also ==
- Olivier Levasseur, elected Captain of the Rising Sun after Moody
- Howell Davis, present when Moody was ejected from the Rising Sun, or shortly afterwards
