= Jolly Roger =

Pirate flag

Jolly Roger
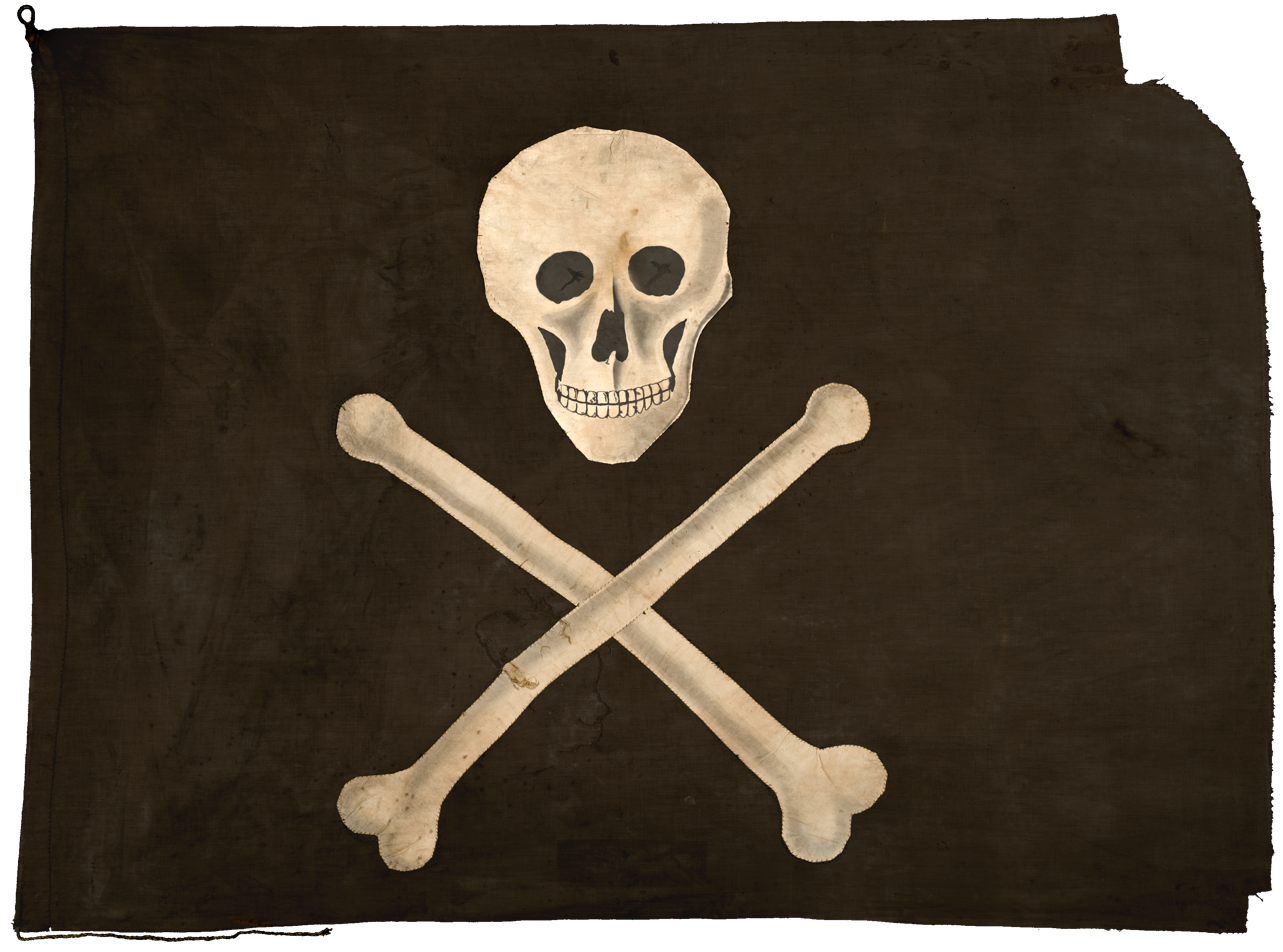
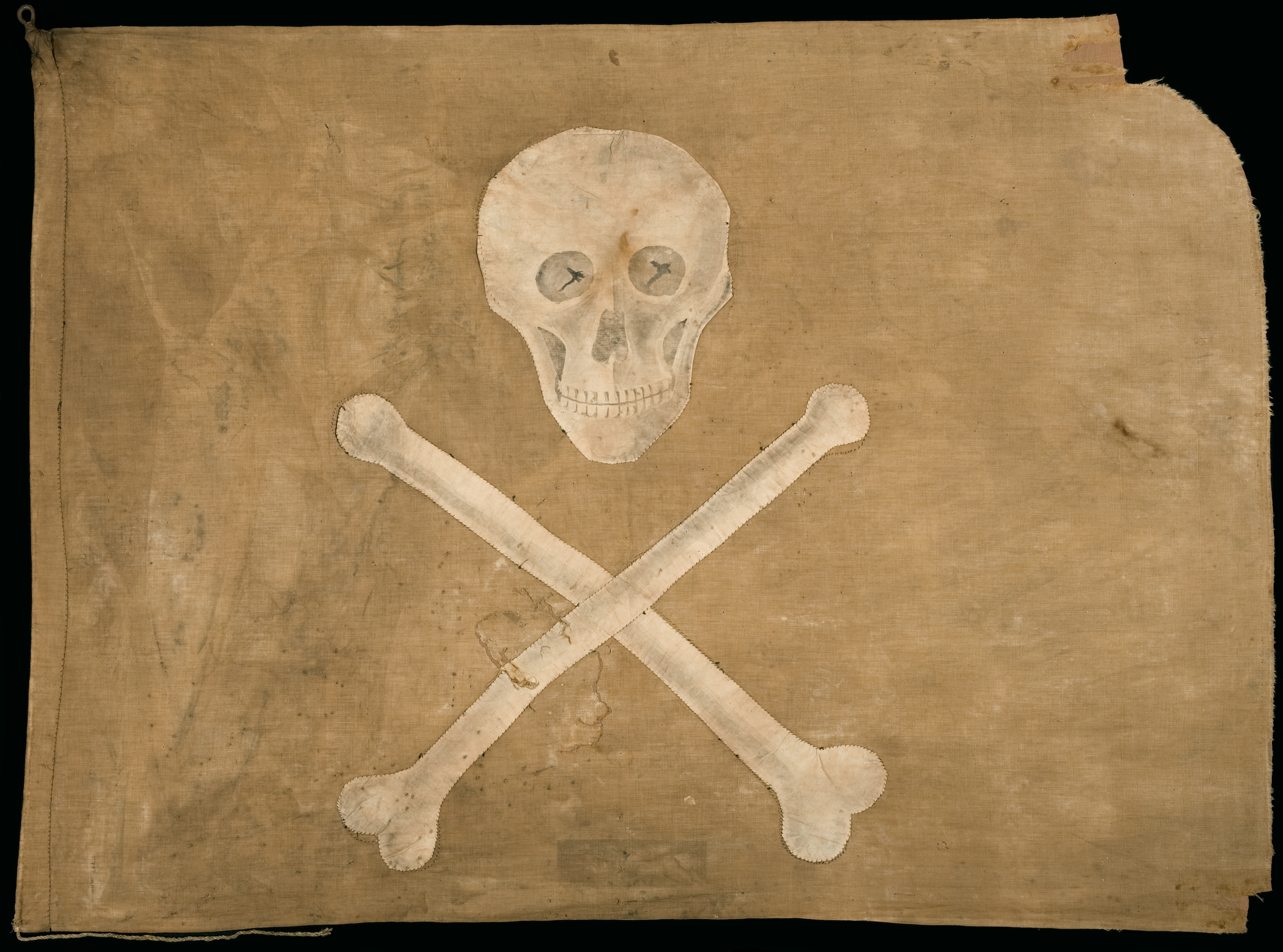
A typical Jolly Roger flag. This 19th-century Barbary Corsairs flag currently resides at the Åland Maritime Museum in Finland. The flag (right) in its current condition is lighter, while the color-corrected version (left) is darker.

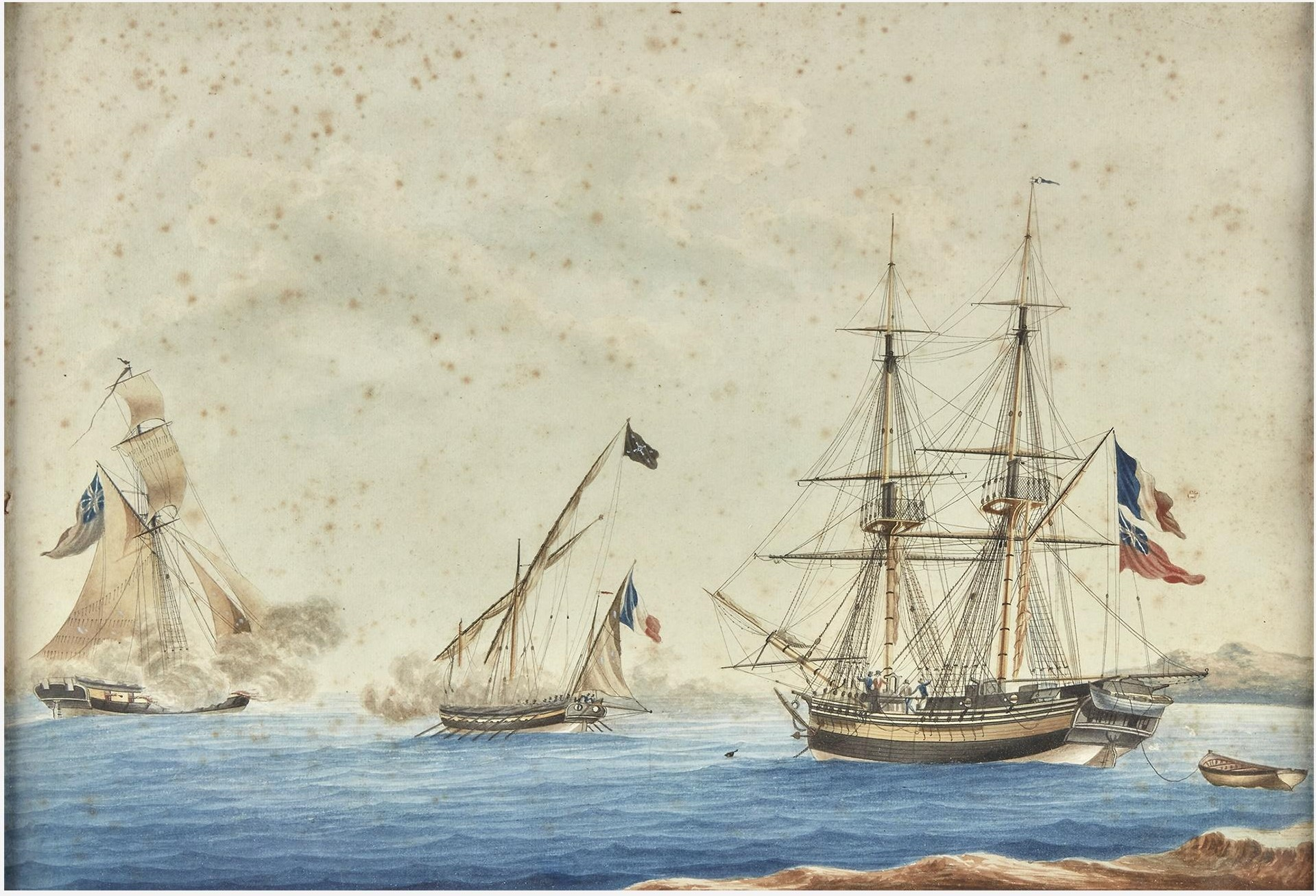
Painting showing a French First Republic privateer flying a black Jolly Roger, signed and dated "Nicolas Cammillieri pinxit 1811", with the inscription: "On the 14 Germinal year 7 of the French Republic (3 April 1796), in the Bay of Colonia on the coast of Spain, 4-hour long fight of the privateer Mouche, armed with an 8-pounder swivel gun, under Captain Jean Adrian, against a 16-nine-pounder gun cutter, to recapture the prize called Lavantoroso (?) which said privateer had captured the previous night while [the cutter] was escorting [the contested prize]".

The Jolly Roger was the ensign flown by a pirate ship preceding or during an attack, during the early 18th century (the latter part of the Golden Age of Piracy). The vast majority of such flags flew the motif of a human skull, or "Death's Head", often accompanied by other elements, on a black field, sometimes called the "Death's Head flag" or just the "black flag".

The flag most commonly identified as the Jolly Roger today – the skull and crossbones symbol on a black flag – was used during the 1710s by a number of pirate captains, including Samuel Bellamy, Edward England, and John Taylor. It became the most commonly used pirate flag during the 1720s, although other designs were also in use.

== Etymology ==
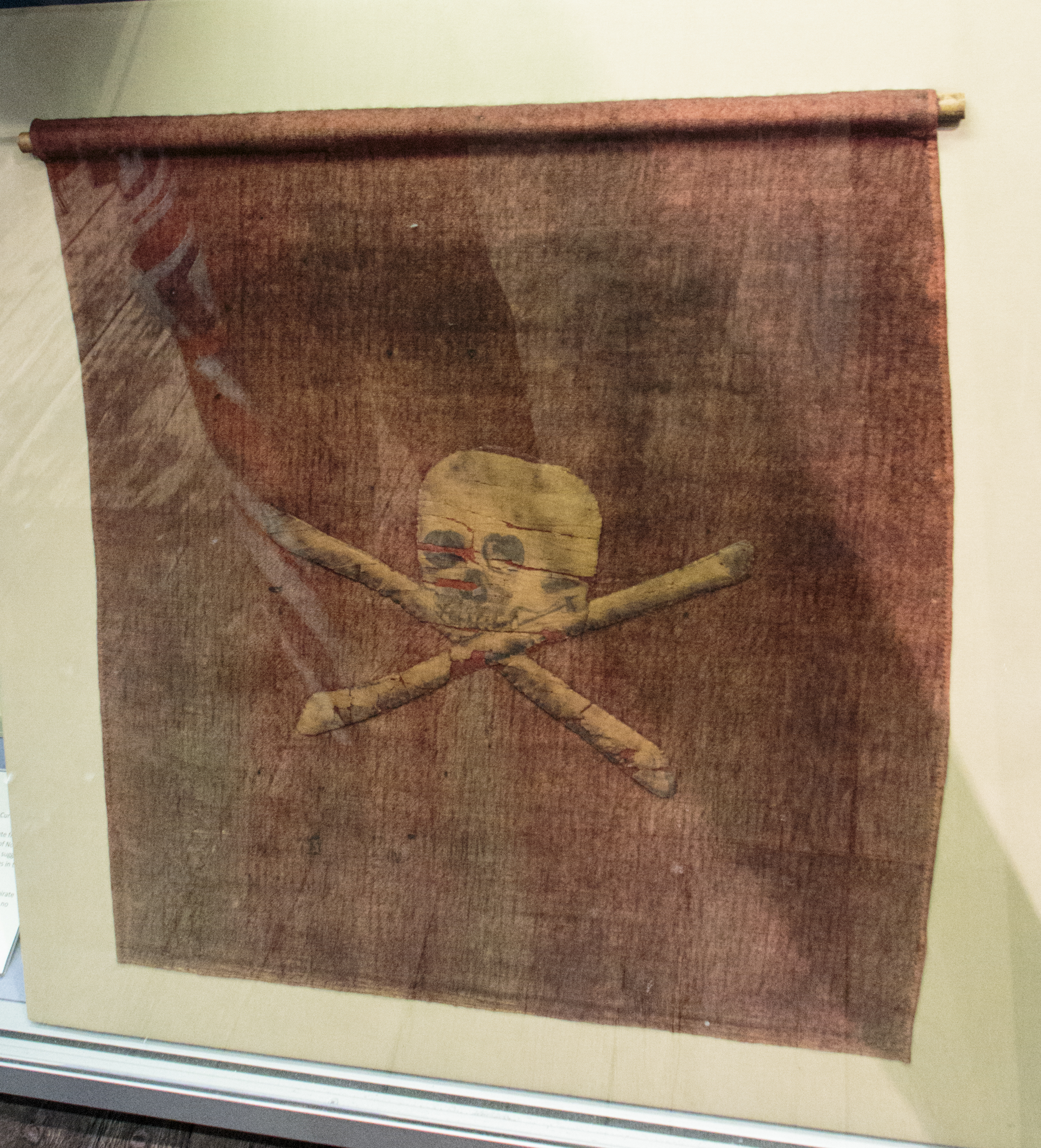
This red flag, captured by the Royal Navy in 1780 and now on display at the National Museum of the Royal Navy, Portsmouth, is another example of a Jolly Roger flag.

Use of the term Jolly Roger in reference to pirate flags goes back to at least Charles Johnson's A General History of the Pyrates, published in Britain in 1724 and in fact has no connection to the given name Roger.

Johnson specifically cites two pirates as having named their flag "Jolly Roger": Bartholomew Roberts in June 1721 and Francis Spriggs in December 1723. While Spriggs and Roberts used the same name for their flags, their flag designs were very different, suggesting that already "Jolly Roger" was a generic term for black pirate flags rather than a name for any single specific design. Neither Spriggs's nor Roberts's Jolly Roger consisted of a skull and crossbones.

Richard Hawkins, who was captured by pirates in 1724, reported that the pirates had a black flag bearing the figure of a skeleton stabbing a heart with a spear, which they named "Jolly Roger". This description closely resembles the flags of a number of Golden Age pirates.

Other versions exist, such as "Old Roger", found in a news report in the Weekly Journal or British Gazetteer (London, Saturday, 19 October 1723; Issue LVII, p. 2, col. 1):

"Parts of the West-Indies. Rhode-Island, July 26. This Day, 26 of the Pirates taken by his Majesty Ship the Greyhound, Captain Solgard, were executed here. Some of them delivered what they had to say in writing, and most of them said something at the Place of Execution, advising all People, young ones especially, to take warning by their unhappy Fate, and to avoid the crimes that brought them to it. Their black flag, under which they had committed abundance of Pyracies and Murders, was affix'd to one Corner of the Gallows. It had in it the Portraiture of Death, with an Hour-Glass in one Hand, and a Dart in the other, striking into a Heart, and three Drops of Blood delineated as falling from it. This Flag they called Old Roger, and us'd to say, They would live and die under it."

Old Roger itself is an old humorous or familiar name for the devil, or death, indicating that the name "Jolly Roger" might refer to the devil or death; maybe the grin of a death's head (skull).

It is sometimes claimed that the term derives from "Joli Rouge" ("Pretty Red") in reference to a red flag used by French privateers. This is sometimes attributed to red blood, symbolizing violent pirates, ready to kill. Another origin includes a phonetic version of the name of a supposed Indian pirate called "Ali Rajah." Historians discount both of these origins for lack of any period reference or mention. "Roger" as a term also applied to both a scoundrel or rogue, as well as for a police officer; it also was a slang term for penis. In addition, "Johnny Roger" was a nickname for Woodes Rogers, the former privateer who became Governor of New Providence charged with ending piracy in the region.

== History ==
The first recorded uses of the skull-and-crossbones symbol on naval flags date to the 17th century. It possibly originated among the Barbary pirates of the period, which would connect the black colour of the Jolly Roger to the Muslim Black Standard (black flag). But an early reference to Muslim corsairs flying a skull symbol, in the context of a 1625 slave raid on Cornwall, explicitly refers to the symbols being shown on a green flag. There are mentions of English privateer Francis Drake flying a black flag as early as 1585, but the historicity of this tradition has been called into question. Contemporary accounts show Peter Easton using a plain black flag in 1612; a plain black flag was also used by Captain Martel's pirates in 1716, Charles Vane, and Richard Worley in 1718, and Howell Davis in 1719.

An early record of the skull-and-crossbones design being used on a (red) flag by pirates is found in a 6 December 1687 entry in a logbook held by the Bibliothèque nationale de France. The entry describes pirates using the flag, not on a ship but on land.

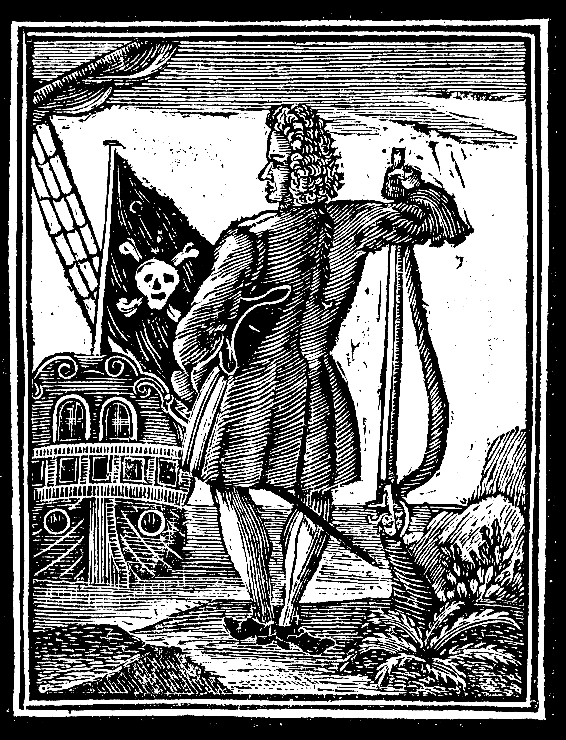
1725 woodcut of Stede Bonnet with a Jolly Roger in Charles Johnson's A General History of the Pyrates

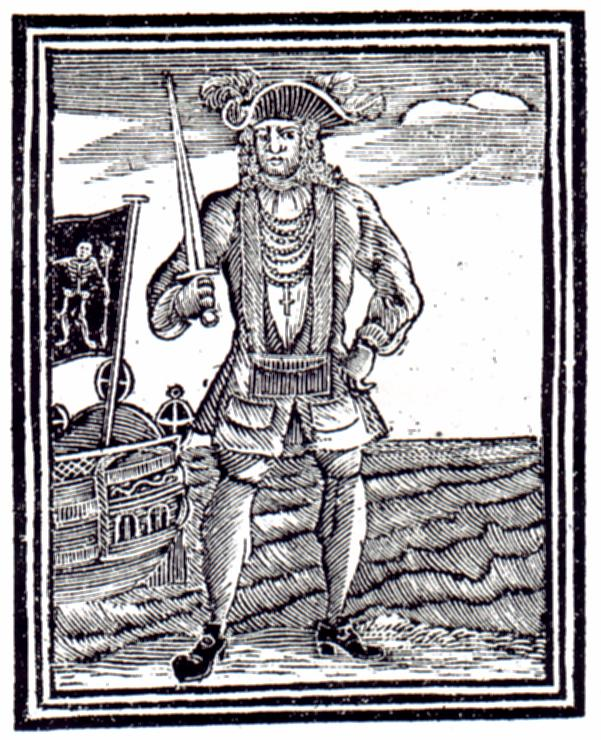
1725 woodcut of Bartholomew Roberts with a Jolly Roger in Charles Johnson's A General History of the Pyrates

During the 17th and 18th centuries, British privateers were required to fly a specific flag, the 1606 Union Jack with a white crest in the middle, to distinguish them from Royal Navy vessels. Before this time, British privateers, such as Sir Henry Morgan, sailed under the Red Ensign. An early use of a black flag with skull, crossbones, and hourglass is attributed to pirate captain Emanuel Wynn in 1700, according to a wide variety of secondary sources. Reportedly, these secondary sources are based on the account of Captain John Cranby of HMS Poole and are verified at the London Public Record Office.

With the end of the War of the Spanish Succession in 1714, many privateers turned to piracy. They still used red and black flags, but now they decorated them with their own designs. Edward England, for example, flew three different flags: from his mainmast, the black flag depicted above; from his foremast, a red version of the same; and from his ensign staff, the Red Ensign. Just as variations on the Jolly Roger design existed, red flags sometimes incorporated yellow stripes or images symbolic of death. Coloured pennants and ribbons could also be used alongside flags.

Marcus Rediker (1987) claims that most pirates active between 1716 and 1726 were part of one of two large interconnected groups sharing many similarities in organization. He states that this accounts for the "comparatively rapid adoption of the piratical black flag among a group of men operating across thousands of miles of ocean", suggesting that the skull-and-crossbones design became standardized at about the same time as the term Jolly Roger was adopted as its name. By 1730, the diversity of symbols in prior use had been mostly replaced by the standard design.

== Use in practice ==
Pirates did not fly the Jolly Roger at all times. The flag was intended as communication of the pirates' identity, which gave target ships an opportunity to decide to surrender without a fight. For example, in June 1720, when Bartholomew Roberts sailed into the harbour at Trepassey, Newfoundland, with black flags flying, the crews of all 22 vessels in the harbour abandoned their ships in panic.

=== Black and red flag ===
Pirate signal flags

black flag
(quarter given)

red flag
(no quarter)

During the latter half of the Golden Age of Piracy, the Jolly Roger was part of a flag signal combination, comprising a "black flag", i.e. the Jolly Roger, and a "red flag", often called a bloody flag.

- The "black flag" signaled that "quarter" would be given if the target surrendered their cargo/valuables, meaning that all enemies will be guaranteed mercy after surrender or capture.
- The "red flag" signaled that "no quarter" would be given and the target's cargo/valuables taken by force, meaning that no mercy will be shown and no life will be spared in an attack.

When closing on a target ship, the pirate ship would normally fly a false flag or no colours until they had their prey within firing range. Like other vessels, pirate ships usually stocked a variety of flags for various purposes.

When the pirates' intended victim was within range, the black flag would be raised, often simultaneously with a warning shot, communicating the pirates' identity to the target ship in order to persuade them to surrender without a fight. Surrendering without a fight meant that they would cooperate with the pirate's demands and allow them to rifle through their cargo, which was sometimes rewarded with some cargo being left alone. To signal "yes", the victim ship would have to take down their own flag, in naval terminology called "striking the colors".

Followed by warning shots, if the enemy did not strike their own flag to signal surrender, the pirates would raise the red flag, which would signal that the cargo would be taken by force and that "no quarter would be given" to prisoners. If the pirates had several ships, the raising of the bloody flag could also act as the signal "to attack" for the rest of the ships. The pirate captain Jean Thomas Dulaien would wait for the enemy to fire three or more cannon shots after raising the red flag before giving the order to attack with no quarter given.

The bloody flag was an already-established naval flag and was not unique to piracy. An early claim of the black and red flag combination was made in the mid-18th century by Richard Hawkins; however, the cited content may simply relate to different pirate captains, their ships, their chosen flag and particular operating practices. The black and red flag tactic was not universal, such as the case of Charles Vane: "[he] took down his St. George's Flag, and hoisted a black Flag with a Death's Head in it, which is their Signal to intimate, that they will neither give or take Quarter."

=== Function in practice ===
In view of these models, it was important for a prey ship to know that its assailant was a pirate, and not a privateer or government vessel, as the latter two generally had to abide by a rule that if a crew resisted but then surrendered, it could not be executed:

An angry pirate therefore posed a greater danger to merchant ships than an angry Spanish coast guard or privateer vessel. Because of this, although, like pirate ships, Spanish coast guard vessels and privateers were almost always stronger than the merchant ships they attacked, merchant ships may have been more willing to attempt resisting these "legitimate" attackers than their piratical counterparts. To achieve their goal of taking prizes without a costly fight, it was therefore important for pirates to distinguish themselves from these other ships also taking prizes on the seas.

Flying a Jolly Roger was a reliable way of proving oneself a pirate. Just possessing or using a Jolly Roger was considered proof that one was a criminal pirate rather than something more legitimate; only a pirate would dare fly the Jolly Roger, as they were already under threat of execution.

== Design ==
Before 1700, pirates flew a plain black flag together with the red ("bloody") flag, the use of emblems first taking the scene in the 18th century.

Jolly Roger variations possibly existed as a type of personal calling card to be associated with a certain pirate crew's reputation and thus make enemies surrender more easily; however, this is not mentioned by period sources. Flag motifs could often not be made out at longer ranges; thus, flag details was more likely an internal mark of identity for the crew. Historically, most pirates reused the same designs as their peers, possibly to partake in the reputation of others, eventually leading to designs such as the skull and crossbones becoming the norm.

Pirates sometimes used a national flag to symbolize their nationality or their allegiance to a nation.

=== Common elements ===
- Upper left: Skull and crossbones
- Upper right: Skeleton
- Lower left: Hourglass
- Lower right: Sword arm

Key elements commonly found on a Jolly Roger flag typically include (some rarer than others):

- Skull and crossbones – The skull, historically called "death's head" (compare German: totenkopf), represents death and danger, emphasizing the pirates' ruthless and deadly reputation. The crossbones are often positioned behind or beneath the skull and create an "X" shape. They symbolize crossed swords or bones, signifying violence and conflict
- Human skeleton – the period depiction of the personification of death, sometimes carrying out symbolic gestures of suffering and death, such as stabbing a heart with a spear, wielding weapons and even signal instruments
- Hourglass – symbolizing that the life of the attacked is running out
- Bundle of arrows – an older regal or state symbol alluding to the proverb that arrows can be easily broken one by one but are unbreakable if tied together; however, in the case of the Jolly Roger, more likely to symbolize implements of death
- Sword – symbolizing implements of death
- Sword arm – symbolizing implements of death, a common naval motif outside piracy (see the Dutch Bloody flag)
- Pistol – symbolizing implements of death
- Cannon – symbolizing implements of death
- Powder horn or signal horn – symbolizing implements of death

=== Historical designs ===
All illustrations presented here are merely artistic interpretations based on surviving descriptions and do not faithfully represent actual flags.

==== Black flags ====
Sub-article: Old Roger (Jolly Roger)

Interpretation of Emanuel Wynne's pirate flag, described by Captain St. John Cranby of HMS Poole as "a sable ensigne with Cross bones, a Death's head, and an hour glase".

Interpretation of the "Old Roger" design, as described for several pirates, such as Edward Low, Charles Harris, and Francis Spriggs; see Old Roger (Jolly Roger).

Interpretation of a death's head flag used by various pirates such as Edward "Blackbeard" Teach, Stede Bonnet, Charles Vane, Thomas Anstis, Captain Kennedy, Christopher Condent, and Howell Davis.

Interpretation of Stede Bonnet's flag from A General History of the Pyrates, described as "On the morning of the [8th of April] a large Ship and a sloop with Black Flags and Deaths Heads in them and three more sloops with Bloody Flags all bore down upon the said ship Protestant Caesar". Also a description of Blackbeard's flag.

Interpretation of Edward England, John Taylor and Samuel Bellamy's Jolly Roger as described by Thomas Baker of Bellamy's crew: "..they spread a large black flag, with a Death's Head and Bones across, and gave chase to Cap't. Prince under the same colours".

Another flag used by Samuel Bellamy, described as "A black Ensign, with Death holding an Hour-Glass in one Hand and a [speaking] Trumpet in the other".

Another of Levasseur's pirate flags, described as "A black flag in which is represented a corpse which holds in one hand a saber which he holds raised, at his feet a man on his knees."

Another of Levasseur's pirate flags, described as "… made of black cloth and was painted in the middle a skeleton flanked by scattered bones and crossed cutlasses"

Another of Levasseur's pirate flags, described as "They made it of black silk. In its centre, there was the figure of a naked man with a cutlass in his right hand, and the left one holding a decapitated [sic] head by the hair."

Another of Levasseur's pirate flags, described as a "Black flag in which for figure there were four skulls and two bones in cross with white tears".

Another of Levasseur's pirate flags, described as a "black flag with a skeleton holding an hourglass and a sword, teardrops, and a man lying down".

Interpretation of Bartholomew Roberts' Jolly Roger as described by an eyewitness in the Boston Gazette, 22 August 1720: "a Black Flag with Death's head and a cutlass in it".

Interpretation of Bartholomew Roberts' Jolly Roger as used during the battle of Trepassy harbour, 1720, as described by eyewitness William Matthew: "a death's head and an arm with a cutlass".

Interpretation of Edward Low's second flag, described as "a black Flag, with the Figure of Death in Red"

Interpretation of a flag used by various pirates such as John Cole, George Lowther, Richard Worley, and James Skyrme.

Alternate flag of Howell Davis, which "represented a man asleep and a skeleton with one hand a clock, a sword of the other."

Another Howell Davis flag; "gun" here means carriage-gun or cannon: "their Standard, which they hoisted at Main-topmast-head, with a Gun and Sword."

Interpretation of a flag Commodore Roggewein described in 1721 as "a black flag, with a Death's head in the centre, a powder horn over it and two bones underneath".

Interpretation of a flag used by an unknown pirate crew, described as "two unidentified pirates (1718) at Barbados and Saint-Domingue flying multiple 'death's heads' on a black field". It is incorrectly associated with Christopher Condent.

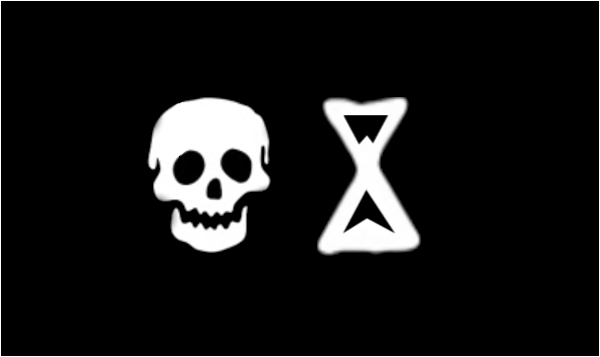
Captain Napin "had in his flag a Deaths Head and an hour glass" - Boston News Letter of August 12, 1717

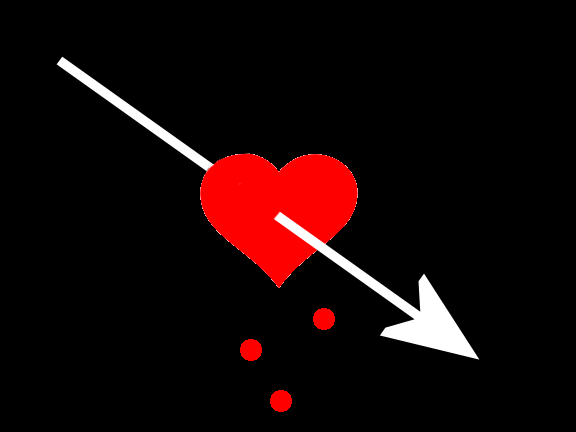
Thomas Nichols "had in his flag a dart and a bleeding heart." - Boston News Letter of August 12, 1717

Boston News Letter described the flag of John Phillips as "Their own dark flag, in the middle of which an anatomy, and at one side of it a dart in the heart, with drops of blood proceeding from it; and on the other side an hour-glass."

Flag associated with William Moody. Described as "A black Flag, having a white Man painted in it, with three Arrows, whose Points were turn'd toward a red Heart, and underneath it were some red Spots, resembling Blood."

Another flag associated with William Moody. Described as a "Heart pierc'd by an Arrow."

Interpretation of a pirate flag described by William Falconer (1732–1769) as, "[t]he colours usually displayed by pirates are laid to be a black field, with a death's head, a battle-axe and hour-glass."

Interpretation of the Jolly Roger flag depicted on a 1811 painting of a 1796 battle, flown by the French First Republic privateer 'La Mouche', captained by a "Jean Adrian". The flaming grenades are speculative, based on inexplicable white dots on the original.

Another of Jeremiah Cocklyn's flags, described as "the skeleton of a human body such as Death used to be represented by, and in the other Side a morthead with two bones across and a sandglass…"

Another of Jeremiah Cocklyn's flags, described as "a Man's arm with a dagger in his hand and on the other side a morthead and glass…".

Flag of Jean Thomas Dulaien, described as "The flag was black, with a skull and crossbones below on the hoist and a naked man holding a cutlass in one hand and over the skull and bones and an hourglass in the other, on the fly." There is no evidence of Walter Kennedy flying this flag; after he mutinied against Bartholomew Roberts, Kennedy and the rest of the crew retired from piracy and sailed to Ireland.

Another flag design by Dulaein, described as "Figures of heads cut off (ie skulls) with a cutlass, piles of bones and hourglasses". Made out of a fabric called "Ras de St. Maur" - a fine fabric either of wool or silk made in the town of St. Maur - Flag measurement: 22 ft 9in long, 14 ft 9in wide

Pirate flag of Philip Lyne described as "their Black Silk Flagg before them, with the Representation of a Man in full proportion, with a Cutlass in one Hand and a Pistol in the other"

Pirate flag of Captain Kennedy, described as a "black Ensign [with] the Figure of a Man with a Sword in his hand and an Hourglass before him, with a Death's head and bones." Not to be confused with Walter Kennedy where there is no evidence of him ever flying a distinct pirate flag.

==== Bloody flags ====
Alongside the black flag, Dulaien also flew a red pennant.

Interpretation of Bartholomew Sharp's pirate flag, described as "a red Flag, with a bunch of white and green Ribbons".

A plain red flag used by John Coxon.

Interpretation of an unknown pirate flag from the Florida Straits described as in 1822, "hoisted a red flag with death's head and cross under it." The "cross" might have referred to crossed bones.

Interpretation of a French filibusters flag from 1688 described as a "red flag with a death's head at the center and two crossed bones below the head, in white, in the middle of the red".

Bloody flag used by the 17th-century Dutch navy, possibly in return by Dutch pirates considering the motif's appearance on black flags during the following 18th century.

Bacchus under Capt. Stevens in 1731 encountered "a Spanish Guarde Costa, which fir'd a Gun at her, and she return'd; upon which they hoisted a red Flag, with a Death's Head."

Flag of the privateers in the service of the League of the Free Peoples

Flag with a Berbian head used by Algerian privateers

Flag used by Algerian corsairs

==== Blue flags ====
A plain blue flag used by Claes Gerritszoon Compaen and Laurens de Graaf.

According to one source, Charles Harris used a blue version of the Old Roger flag.

==== Green flags ====
A green Barbary corsairs flag with a skull on it.

The flag of Hayreddin Barbarossa.

A plain green flag used by Peter Harris.

Described by George Roberts after his capture by Edward Low: "After which, [Low] ordered a Consultation Signal to be made, which was their Green Trumpeter, as they called him, hoisted at the Mizen-Peek: It was a green silk flag, with a yellow figure of a man blowing a Trumpet on it."

==== Striped flags ====
A pirate flag used by Richard Sawkins, described as "a red Flag striped with yellow...".

A flag used by Edmund Cooke, described as "red Colours striped with yellow, with a Hand and Sword for his devise".

==== White flags ====
Interpretation of the pirate flag of Olivier "La Buse" Levasseur, described as a "white ensign with a figure of a dead man spread in it"; one of the few mentions of a black-on-white Jolly Roger flag.

Another flag of Olivier Levesseur, described as a "Death's head in black in ye middle of a white ensign."

Flag of buccaneer Edward Davis, described in Burney's History of the Buccaneers (1816): "as he was furnished with a French commission, and France was still at war with Spain, he carried aloft a white flag, in which was painted a hand and sword."

The pirate flag of John Rackham, described as a "white pendant". Likely was a flag already on the William when it was stolen.

Flag of an unknown pirate crew, described as "a white Pendant at the Topmast-Head, with a naked Man and a Sword in his Hand" and "a white Streamer in the Top-mast, with a naked Man brandishing a Sword".

Flag of the privateers in the service of the League of the Free Peoples

Chinese pirate flag with the bagua and taijitu, captured by George Henry Preble. Circa 1871

==== Yellow flags ====
Described by privateer George Shelvocke as "a yellow field and black human skeleton."

==== National flags ====
The Prinsenvlag used by Dutch pirates.

The Flag of England used by John Quelch

Jeremiah Cocklyn's pirate flag, described as "St. George's cross with four balls in the quarter".

Thomas Anstis' pirate flag described as "hoisted a Union Flag, with Four blazing Balls".

Flag of the Maltese corsairs, as shown in various period reproductions in Liam Gauci's In the Name of the Prince: Maltese Corsairs 1760–1798

The flag of the United Provinces of New Granada, which was later adopted and used by Jean Lafitte from 1817 to 1821 at Galveston Island, Spanish Texas, New Spain

Flag of the Republic of Salé, a Barbary state in modern-day Morocco, 17th century

Flag of Ottoman Tripolitania, another Barbary corsair state, c.1551–1835

One of several flag designs used by the Regency of Algiers

=== Fictional and unsubstantiated designs ===
Sub-articles: Crossed Swords Jolly Roger, Flag of Blackbeard

These are flag designs commonly attributed to historical pirates but which have no factual basis. Some are modern inventions while others are real flags but mistakenly attributed to specific pirates. Some of these first appeared in the early 20th century in the journal The Mariner's Mirror but were not attributed to specific pirates until 1959 in Hans Leip's Bordbuch des Satans, which also included some never-before-seen designs such as Bonnet's and Rackham's. Several of these were only ever described in Johnson's General History but were never confirmed by witnesses.

This flag is incorrectly attributed to Blackbeard; the "horns" on the skeleton are unknown in period sources, and Blackbeard flew only a "Deaths Head".

The Crossed Swords Jolly Roger is popularly attributed to John Rackham; this flag is a modern invention, and Rackham was not documented as having flown a Jolly Roger.

Traditional depiction of Stede Bonnet's flag.; Bonnet was only ever described (in the Boston Newsletter in June 1718) as having flown a "Death's head."

Popular version of Henry Every's Jolly Roger. Supposedly, Every also flew a version with a black background. There is no period evidence to support this as an authentic flag of Every's.

Popular version of Henry Every's Jolly Roger, in black; see the red version for notes.

The 1724 book A General History of the Pyrates credited Every with flying a black flag emblazoned with two crossed bones forming an X.

According to the ballad "A Copy of Verses," Every's "shield" was red with four gold chevrons and bordered in green. This may have been intended to describe his flag. Although red was a popular colour for pirate flags of the time, the meaning of the four chevrons is not certain; it may have been an attempt (justified or not) to link Every with the West-Country gentry clan of Every whose coats of arms showed similar chevrons.

Supposedly a flag of Christopher Moody's, this was a generic "sea rover" design dating to the late 17th or early 18th centuries and was not attributed to "Christopher" Moody until the 1930s.

Said to be Roberts' first flag, showing himself and Death holding an hourglass.

Said to be Roberts' new flag, showing him holding a sword and standing on two skulls, representing the heads of a Barbadian and a Martiniquian.

Said to be an early rendition of Roberts' second flag with Saint George's Cross in the canton.

Said to be a later rendition of Roberts' second flag, showing him holding a flaming sword.

One of Roberts' flags described in Johnson's General History: "The Flag had a Death in it, with an Hour-Glass in one Hand, and cross Bones in the other, a Dart by it, and underneath a Heart dropping three Drops of Blood."

One of Roberts' flags described in Johnson's General History: "it had the figure of a skeleton in it, and a man portrayed with a flaming sword in his hand, intimating a defiance of death itself."

Tew's personal standard is often depicted as a black flag with a white arm holding a short sword. Buccaneers Edmund Cooke and Edward Davis used a similar design, except Cooke used a red-and-yellow striped field while Davis used a white field with a black arm holding a sword on it. However, there is no evidence from period sources that Tew ever flew this flag, which is a 20th-century attribution.

John Quelch's Old Roger flag is described as having "in the middle of it an Anatomy with an Hourglass in one hand and a dart in the Heart with three drops of Blood proceeding from it in the other." However, there is no evidence whatsoever that Quelch flew any flag other than the Flag of St. George or possibly a privateer's flag of St. George quartered on a red background similar to today's British merchant colors. Courtroom testimony from the crew maintained that the flag of England had been flown at all times.

== Modern military use ==
=== By British submarines ===
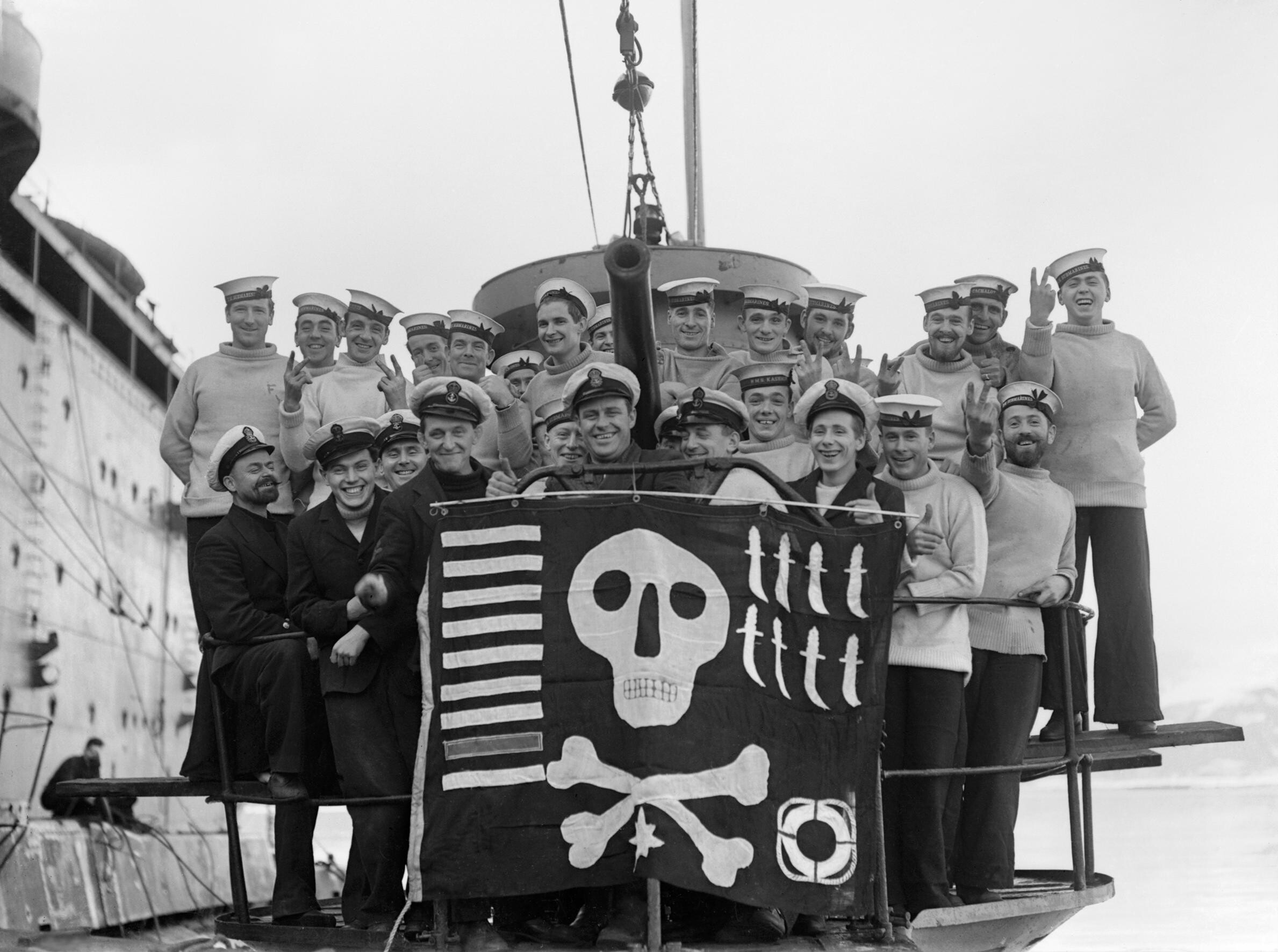
The personnel of the British submarine HMS Utmost showing off their Jolly Roger in February 1942. The markings on the flag indicate the boat's achievements: nine ships torpedoed (including one warship), eight 'cloak and dagger' operations, one target destroyed by gunfire, and one at-sea rescue

Following the introduction of submarines in several navies circa 1900, Admiral Sir Arthur Wilson, the First Sea Lord of the British Royal Navy, stated that submarines were "underhanded, unfair, and damned un-English", and that he would convince the British Admiralty to have the crews of enemy submarines captured during wartime hanged as pirates.

In September 1914, the British submarine HMS E9 successfully torpedoed the German cruiser SMS Hela. Remembering Wilson's statements, commanding officer Max Horton instructed his submariners to manufacture a Jolly Roger, which was flown from the submarine as she entered port. Each successful patrol saw Horton's submarine fly an additional Jolly Roger until there was no more room for flags, at which point Horton had a large Jolly Roger manufactured, onto which symbols indicating E9's achievements were sewn. A small number of other submarines adopted the practice: HMS E12 flew a red flag with the skull and crossbones on return from a foray into the Dardanelles in June 1915, and the first known photograph of the practice was taken in July 1916 aboard HMS H5.

The practice restarted during World War II. In October 1940, following a successful patrol by HMS Osiris, during which she sank the Italian destroyer Palestro, the submarine returned to Alexandria, but was ordered to remain outside the boom net until the motorboat assigned to the leader of the 1st Submarine Flotilla had come alongside. The flotilla leader wanted to recognize the boat's achievement, so had a Jolly Roger made and delivered to Osiris. (Note: One account states that Horton, now Commander in Chief Submarines, was visiting at the time of Osiris' return, and influenced the flotilla leader's decision.) After this, the commanders of submarine flotillas began to hand out the flags to successful submarines. Although some sources claim that all British submarines used the flag, the practice was not taken up by those submarine commanders who saw it as boastful and potentially inaccurate, as sinkings could not always be confirmed. During the war, British submarines were entitled to fly the Jolly Roger on the day of their return from a successful patrol: it would be hoisted as the boat passed the boom net, and remain raised until sunset.

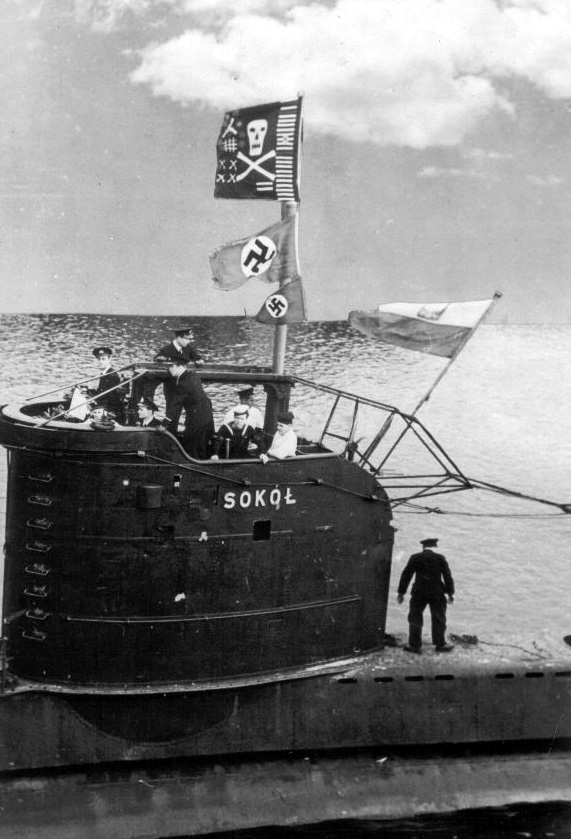
Polish submarine ORP Sokół returning to base in 1944. A Jolly Roger flag and two captured Nazi flags are flying from the periscope mast

Symbols on the flag indicated the history of the submarine, and it was the responsibility of the boat's personnel to keep the flag updated. The Royal Navy Submarine Museum (which, as of 2004, possessed fifteen Jolly Rogers) recognizes 20 unique symbols. A bar denotes the torpedoing of a ship: red bars indicated warships, white bars represented merchant vessels, and black bars with a white "U" stood for U-boats. A dagger indicated a 'cloak and dagger' operation: typically the delivery or recovery of shore parties from enemy territory. Stars (sometimes surrounding crossed cannon) stood for occasions where the deck gun was fired. Minelaying operations were shown by the silhouette of a sea mine: a number inside the mine indicated how many such missions. A lighthouse or torch symbolized the boat's use as a navigational marker for an invasion force; the latter more particularly associated with Operation Torch. Rescue of personnel from downed aircraft or sunken ships was marked by a lifebuoy. Unique symbols are used to denote one-off incidents: for example, the Jolly Roger of HMS Proteus included a can opener, referencing an incident where an Italian destroyer attempted to ram the submarine, but ended up worse off because of damage to the destroyer's hull by the submarine's hydroplanes, while HMS United added a stork and baby when the boat's commander became a father while on patrol. Flying the Jolly Roger continued in the late 20th century and on into the 21st. HMS Conqueror raised the flag decorated with the silhouette of a cruiser to recognize her successful attack on the Argentine cruiser ARA General Belgrano during the Falklands War. Several submarines returning from missions where Tomahawk cruise missiles were fired fly Jolly Rogers with tomahawk axes depicted, with crossed tomahawks indicating an unspecified number of firings, or individual axes for each successful launch.

=== By other units ===
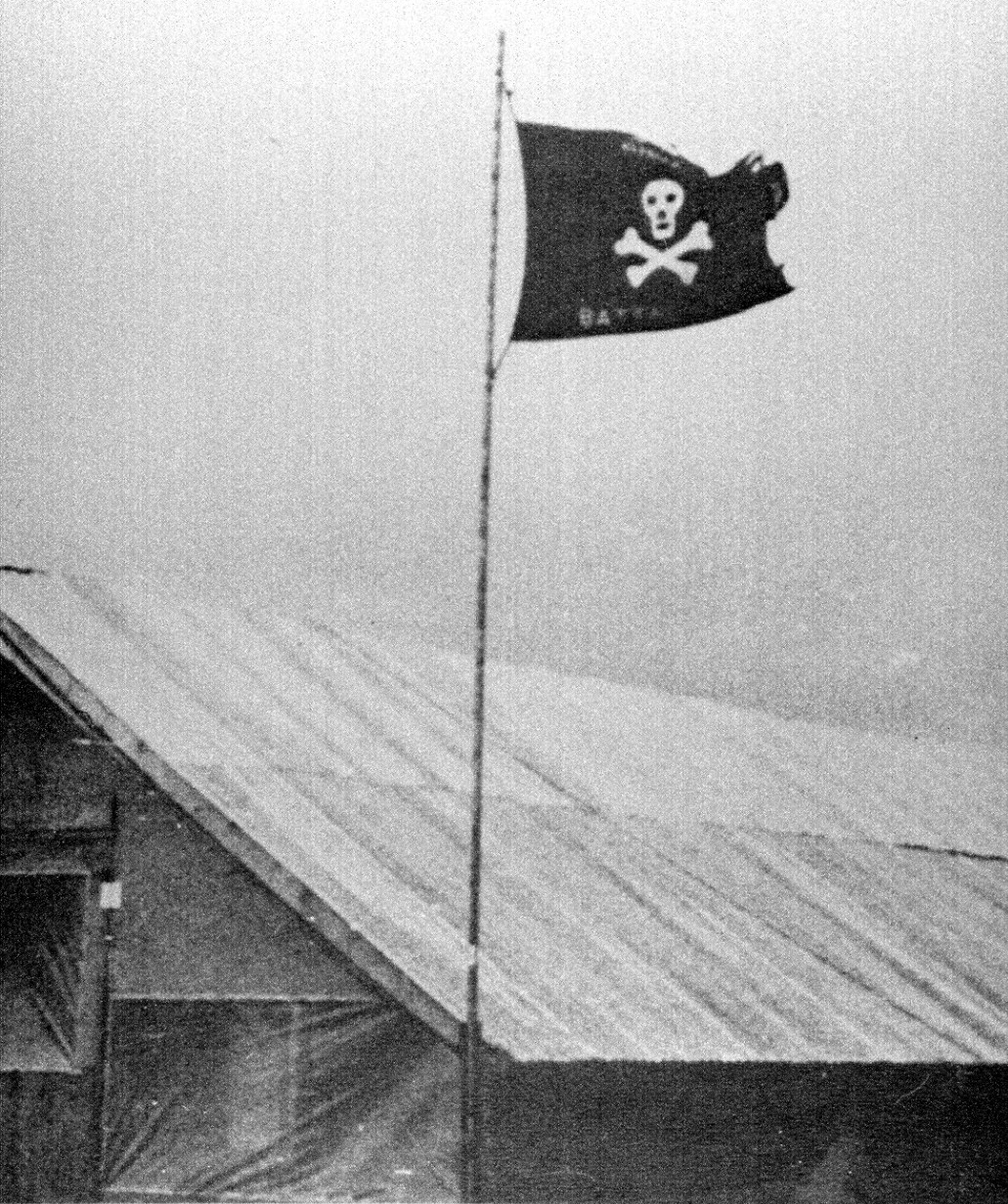
Ghost Battalion colors at Quang Tri. The Seabees had 11,000 graves to move in order to construct that airfield. (U.S. Navy)

The practice, while commonly associated with British submarines, is not restricted to them. During World War II, Allied submariners working with Royal Navy fleets adopted the process from their British counterparts. While operating in the Mediterranean, the Polish submarines ORP Sokół and ORP Dzik were presented with Jolly Rogers by General Władysław Sikorski, and continued to update them during the war. At least one British surface ship recorded their U-boat kills through silhouettes on a Jolly Roger. The Australian submarine HMAS Onslow flew the Jolly Roger in 1980, following her successful participation in the Kangaroo 3 wargame as an opposing submarine: the flag bore the silhouettes of the seven surface ships involved, as during the exercise, Onslow had successfully 'sunk' all seven.

During the Vietnam War, an urgent airfield was needed at Quảng Trị by United States forces. U.S. Seabee Battalions 1, 3, 4, 7, 11, 74, 121, and 133 all sent detachments of men and equipment to get the job done. Construction of the airfield necessitated the removal of 11,000 graves. Those detachments dubbed themselves the Ghost Battalion and chose the Jolly Roger for the Battalion's colors.

During the Vietnam War, United States Marine Corps Radar Technicians with MACS-4 stationed at Monkey Mountain stole a Jolly Roger from a nearby bar and flew it from atop their radar. It has since been used by aviation radar technicians as a symbol of their history and identity.

The Kuperjanov Infantry Battalion, part of the Estonian Land Forces, uses the Jolly Roger as its insignia.

Three distinct U.S. Naval Aviation squadrons have used the name and insignia of the Jolly Roger: VF-17/VF-5B/VF-61, VF-84, and VF-103, since redesignated as VFA-103. While these are distinctly different squadrons that have no lineal linkage, they all share the same Jolly Roger name, the skull and crossbones insignia and traditions.

At least twice in 2017, the USS Jimmy Carter, an American attack submarine modified to support special forces operations, returned to its home port flying a Jolly Roger. The flag was traditionally an indicative of a successful mission.

The three American destroyers named USS Kidd have all flown the Jolly Roger; they were named for U.S. Navy Rear Admiral Isaac C. Kidd, not for William Kidd.

The Jolly Roger is also commonly used by private PMC contractors, in form of patches velcroed on uniforms and tactical jackets.

== In popular culture ==
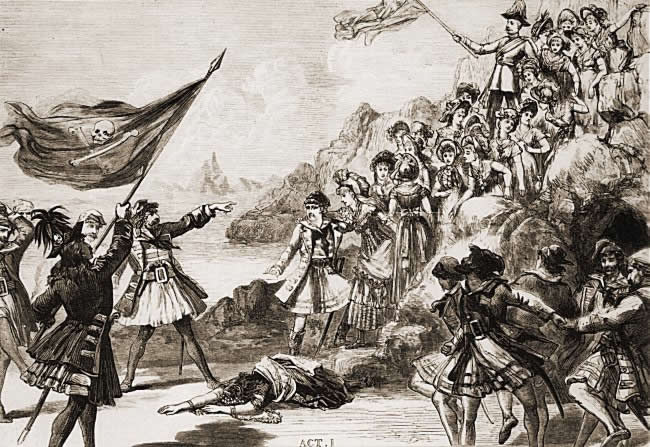
The Jolly Roger raised in an illustration for Gilbert and Sullivan's The Pirates of Penzance

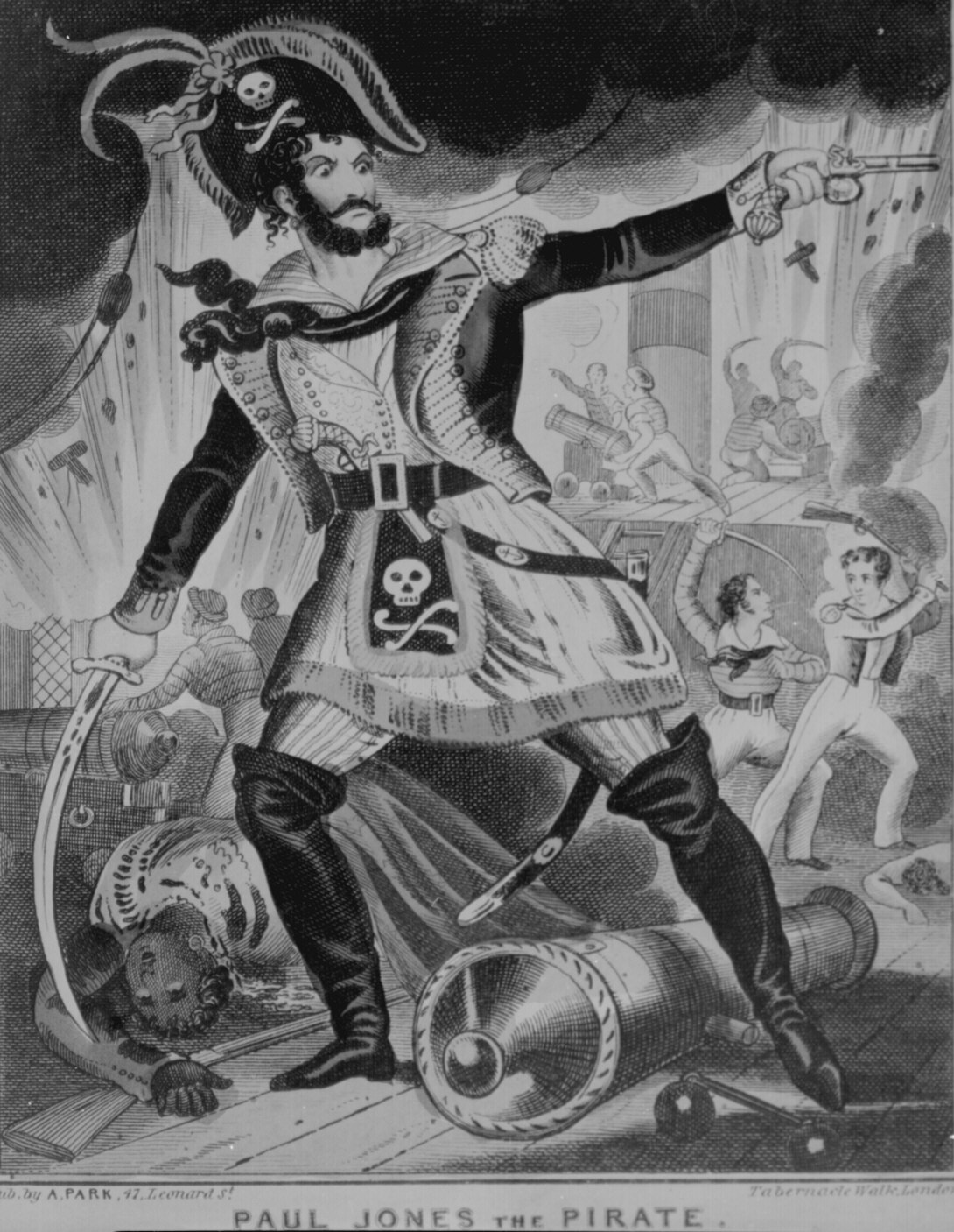
"Paul Jones the Pirate", a British caricature of the late 18th century, is an early example of the Jolly Roger's skull-and-crossbones being transferred to a character's hat, in order to identify him as a pirate (typically a tricorne, or as in this example, the later (1790s) bicorne).

The Jolly Roger flag became a cliché of pirate fiction in the 19th century.

The "Golden Age of Piracy" ended by the mid-18th century, and piracy was widely suppressed by the 1800s, although the problem of Barbary pirates persisted until the French conquest of Algeria in 1830.

By the Victorian era, the pirate threat had receded enough for it to become a topos of boyish adventure fiction, notably influenced by Robert Louis Stevenson's adventure novel Treasure Island (1883). Gilbert and Sullivan's comic opera The Pirates of Penzance (which debuted on 31 December 1879) introduced pirates as comedic characters, and since the later 20th century, pirates sporting the Jolly Roger flag were often depicted as cartoonish or silly characters. J.M. Barrie also used it as the name of Captain Hook's pirate ship in Peter and Wendy (1904 play and 1911 novel); it was thus used in most adaptations of the character, including ABC's television series Once Upon a Time (2011–2018).

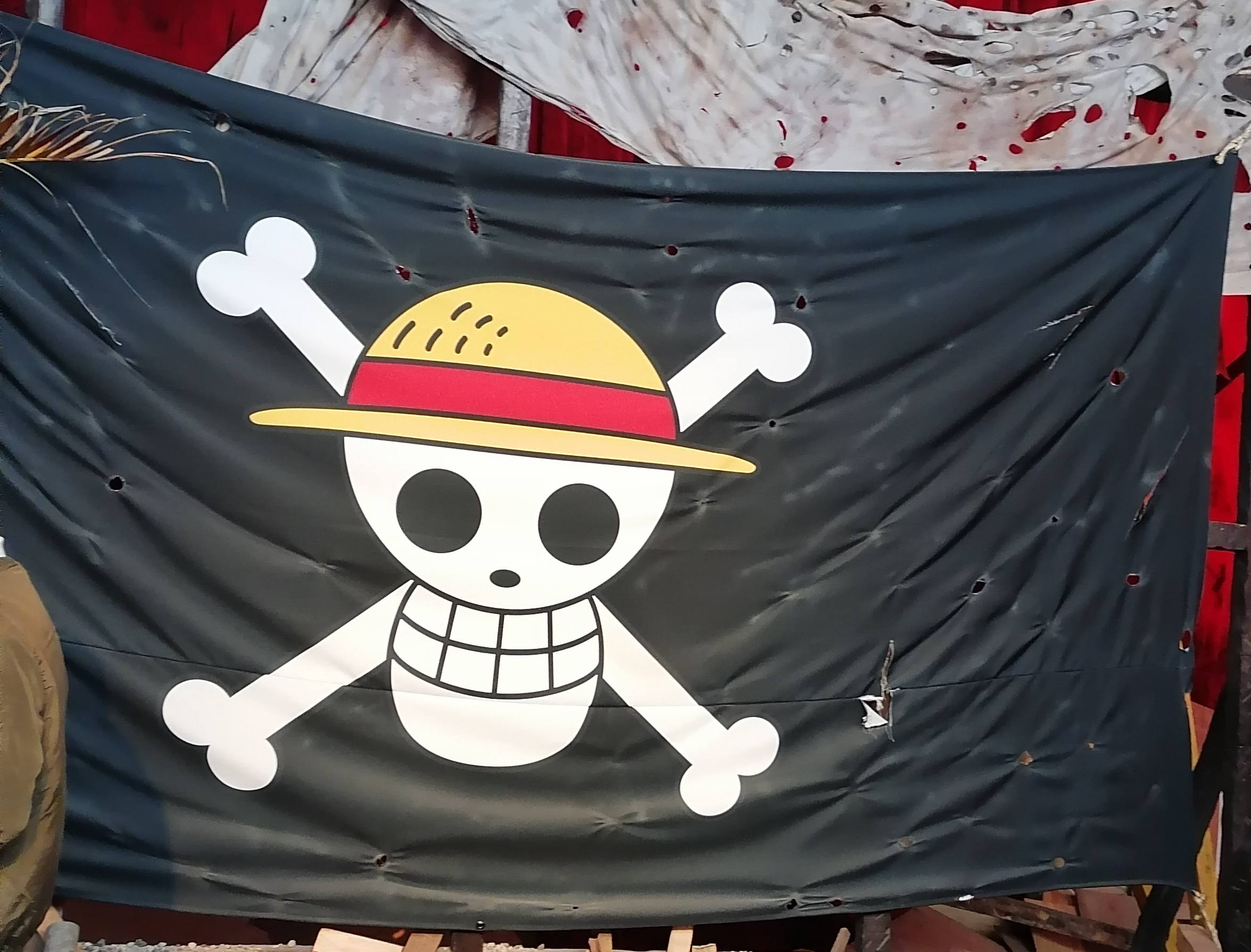
The Straw Hat Pirates' Jolly Roger from One Piece

Additionally, the Jolly Roger is depicted in Eiichiro Oda's manga One Piece, in which the pirate crews in the series have different designs that reflects the appearance of the captain (the Straw Hat Pirates, for example, the protagonist crew, having the classic skull with cross bones wearing a straw hat like the main character, Monkey D. Luffy) or a personal theme of the crew (Black Cat Pirates, for example, one of the antagonist crews, having the head of a black cat with crossbones).

The Jolly Roger appears as an important symbol in the various works centered around Leiji Matsumoto's space pirate character Captain Harlock, where the titular character not only flies the Jolly Roger on his space battleship the Arcadia, but also adorns the Arcadia itself and his clothes with the skull and crossbones, with his crew also doing the latter. In the context of Harlock's usage of the Jolly Roger, as he and his crew have been branded outlaws, he flies the flag as a symbol of freedom and rebellion against whatever force oppresses humanity in a given work, be it the apathetic human government and invading Mazone aliens in the original Space Pirate Captain Harlock manga, the totalitarian Illumidas aliens occupying Earth and a good portion of the galaxy in the Arcadia of My Youth film and subsequent Endless Orbit SSX series, and so on.

=== In film and television ===
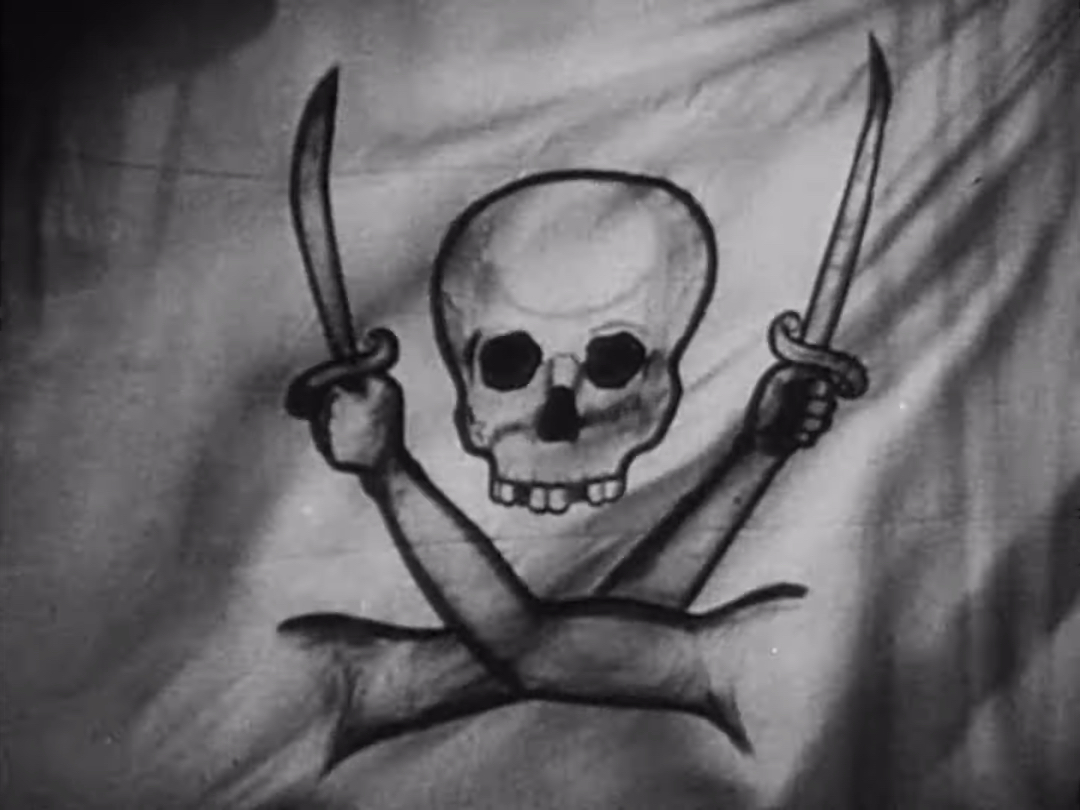
Jolly Roger from Captain Blood

Jolly Roger from The Island

Jolly Roger of One-Eyed Willy from The Goonies

In the film Captain Blood, Peter Blood's flag has a skull and two crossed arms holding swords underneath. In the film The Island (1980), the Jolly Roger is a skull with a red dot and crossbones with an hourglass on the bottom. In Disney's Pirates of the Caribbean, the Black Pearl flies a flag of skull over two crossed swords. In Black Sails, the Jolly Roger is shown at the very end as Jack Rackham's new flag.

=== In music ===
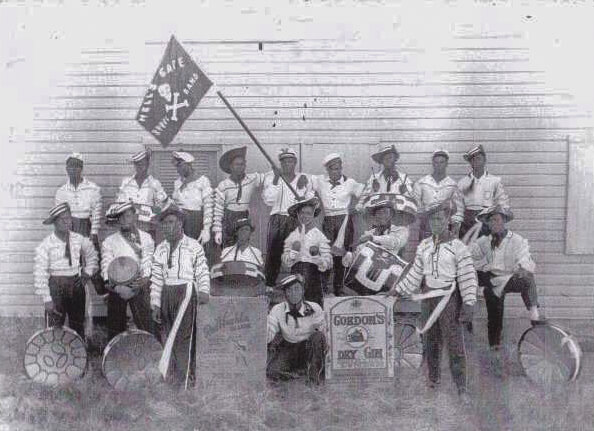
Photo of the "Hell's Gate" steelpan band, Antigua (1950)

Adam and the Ants' album Kings of the Wild Frontier (1980) includes the song, "Jolly Roger".

Kenny Chesney's single "Pirate Flag" is on his fourteenth studio album Life on a Rock (2013).

The cover of indie rock band Half Man Half Biscuit's 2005 album Achtung Bono shows a stylised Jolly Roger, featuring a grinning skull adorned with sunglasses and a halo.

The cover art of Iron Maiden's album A Matter of Life and Death (2006) includes a version of a Jolly Roger depicting a helmeted Eddie and two assault rifles instead of bones, hanging from a tank.

On the cover of Michael Jackson's album Dangerous (1991), the Jolly Roger can be seen on the left side with the alteration of a skull over two swords.

The re-issued version of the Megadeth album, Killing Is My Business... and Business Is Good! (1985), shows a stylized Vic Rattlehead skull on top of crossed swords and crossed bones. This was based on Mustaine's original drawing for the cover which the band did not have enough money to produce at the time.

The "pirate" German metal band Running Wild often references the Jolly Roger and other pirate-related themes in their music. Their third album is named Under Jolly Roger.

Another "pirate" metal band Alestorm also uses Jolly Roger and other pirate-related themes in their music.

The Pirates, a spinoff of the band Johnny Kidd & the Pirates, released an album called Out of their Skulls featuring a skull with crossed guitars below it.

British DJ Eddie Richards released the acid house hit "Acid Man" in 1988, under a Jolly Roger alias.

=== In sports ===
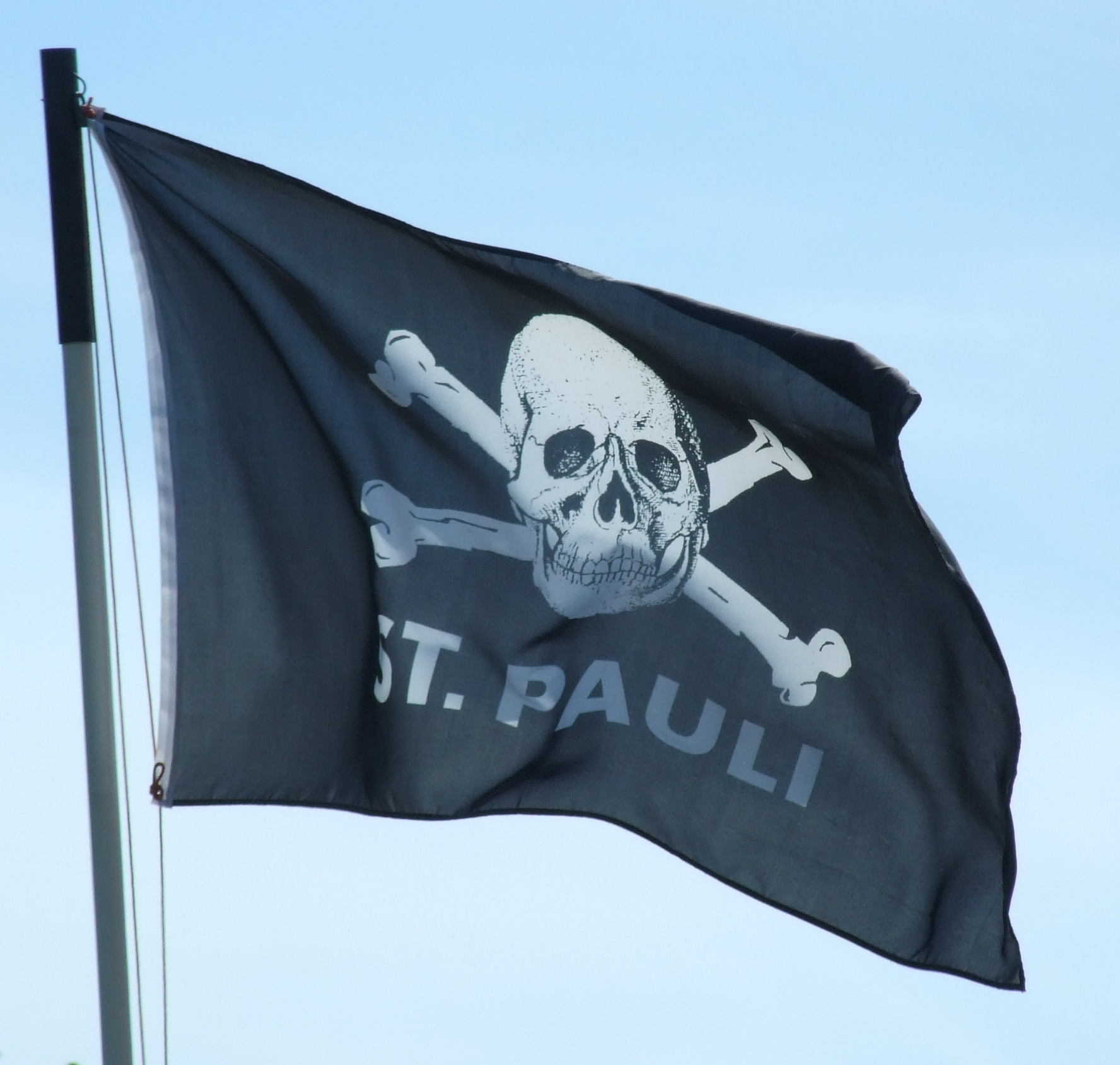
FC St. Pauli's official skull and crossbones symbol on a supporter flag

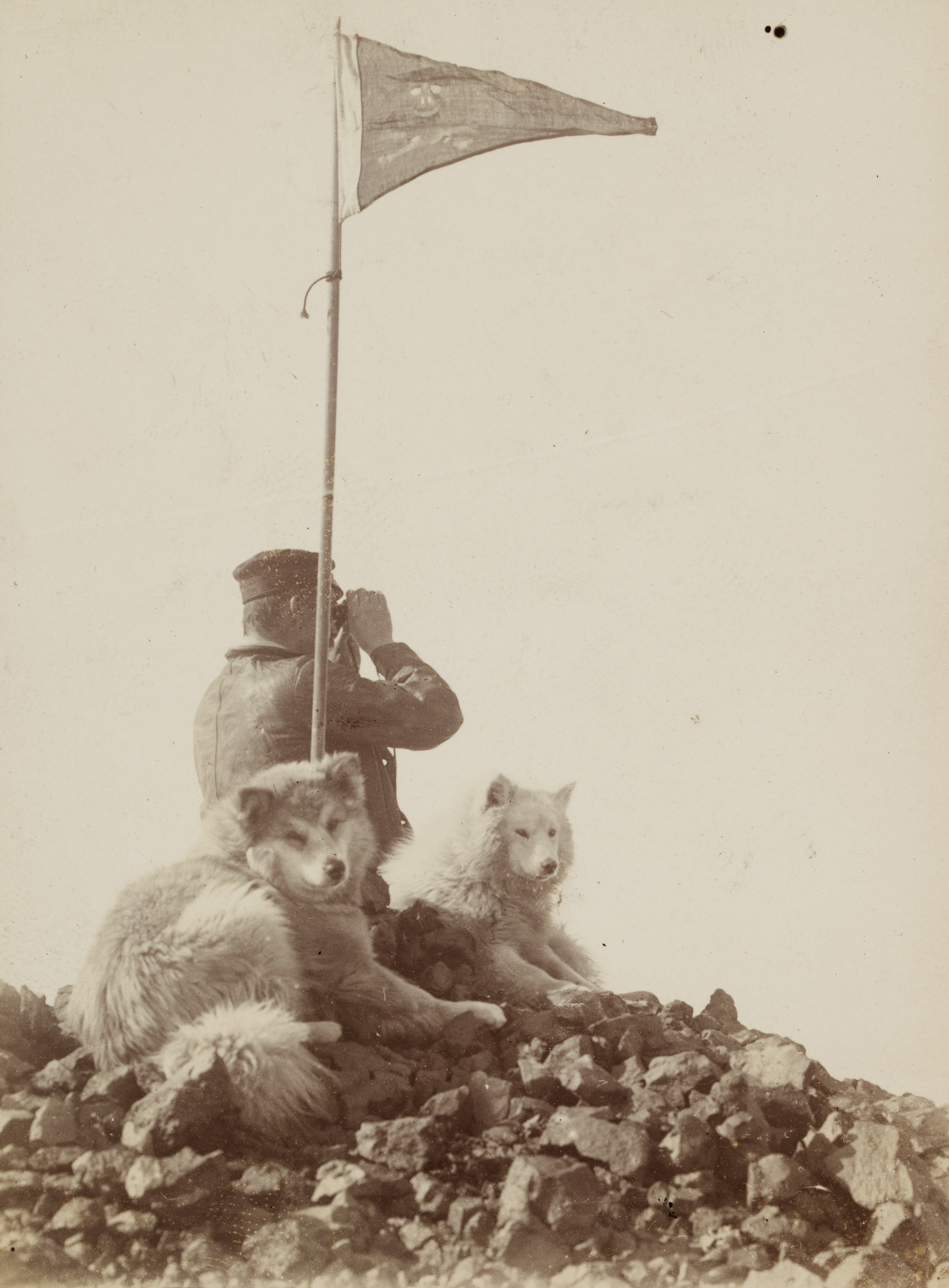
Burgee of the Pirate Yacht Club raised in Antarctica by William Colbeck during the Southern Cross expedition.

A number of sports teams have been known to use variations of the Jolly Roger.

The supporters of FC St. Pauli, a sports club from Hamburg, Germany best known for its association football team, adopted a variation of Richard Worley's flag as their own emblem. The club later bought the rights to the design and made it an official team logo.

The South African Football Association soccer team Orlando Pirates also has the classic Jolly Roger as their logo. Central Coast United FC in Australia use the Jolly Roger as their club crest and their active supporters are known as the Graveyard.

The short-lived Pirate Yacht Club, based in Bridlington, Yorkshire, used a red burgee defaced with a black skull and crossbones. A black skull and crossbones features on the burgee of Penzance Sailing Club, Cornwall.

Burgee of the Pirate Yacht Club, Bridlington (c.1898–1908)

Original burgee of Penzance Sailing Club, 1939 (the Cornish flag was added in the 1990s)

Burgee of Buccaneer Yacht Club

"Raise the Jolly Roger!" is used in a statement by the Major League Baseball's team Pittsburgh Pirates announcer Greg Brown when the Pirates win a game. Fans of the team are known to bring Jolly Roger flags and wave them during the ballgames. The Pirates have also used versions of a skull and crossbones for their logo, with crossed bats in place of swords or bones.

The National Football League's Las Vegas Raiders' use a variation of the Jolly Roger for their logo, which depicts actor Randolph Scott's head with facial features, wearing an eyepatch and a helmet, and crossed swords behind the helmet.

Also in the NFL, the Tampa Bay Buccaneers' use a version of the Crossed Swords Jolly Roger, with a carnelian red background instead of black, and an American football positioned over the intersection of two crossed swords.

The Milwaukee Admirals of the American Hockey League have used a series of pirate Death's heads as their logo. Their current version wears a John Paul Jones-style bicorne hat emblazoned with an "A" spelled out in bones.

All these variations are seen as the logos of sporting teams in Scotland:

- The Braehead Paisley Pirates/Paisley Pirates of the Scottish National League and The Paisley Buccaneers and Riversdale Pirates of the Scottish Recreational Ice Hockey Conference
- The East Kilbride Pirates American football team in BAFA Division 1
- The Edinburgh Buccaneers basketball club of the Scottish Men's National League

The Jolly Roger is the popular icon of all University College Cork (Ireland) sports teams.

The athletic teams of East Carolina University used a stylized Jolly Roger as one of their logos. This particular variation includes an earringed and eyepatch-wearing skull donning a tricorn of purple and gold (the school's colors) emblazoned over two crossbones. This logo appears on the helmets of the school's football team, and an elaborate pre-game ritual takes place prior to each home contest wherein a flag bearing the university's Jolly Roger logo is raised on a special flagpole located behind the west end zone prior to the opening kickoff. Immediately prior to the start of the fourth quarter, the normal (black) Jolly Roger is lowered and replaced with a flag bearing the ECU Jolly Roger on a red background, indicating that the Pirates will grant their opponents "no quarter".

Starting defensive players for the Nebraska Cornhuskers football team are known as the Blackshirts, and are represented by a Jolly Roger similar to Richard Worley's flag with the skull encased in a helmet. Players and fans often celebrate by "throwing the bones", crossing the forearms in front of the chest in an 'X' to imitate the logo. The student section at Memorial Stadium in Lincoln is known as the 'Boneyard', where the logo is often displayed on banners, signs, and flags in an act of intimidation.

=== Other uses ===
The early development team of the Apple Macintosh used a pirate flag to portray a "rebellious" spirit.

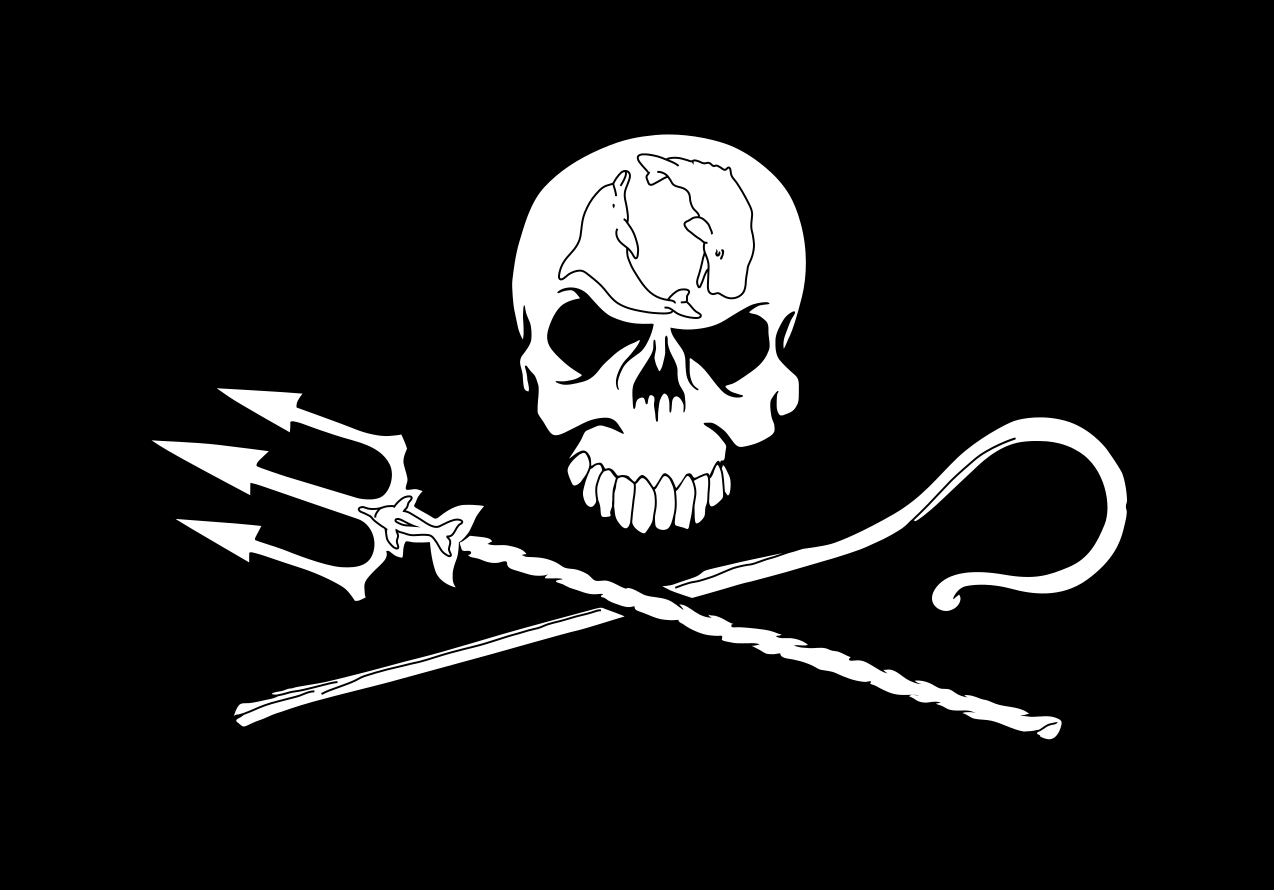
The Sea Shepherd flag

Before changing to a stylized "P", Sweden's Pirate Party used the Jolly Roger as its symbol, which is still used extensively in the Pirate movement. The Piratbyrån and its online database, The Pirate Bay also use either the skull and crossbones symbol, or derivatives of it, such as the logo of Home Taping Is Killing Music.

The flag of the Sea Shepherd Conservation Society is modeled to look like a classic Jolly Roger, with some alterations. The flag depicts a whale and a dolphin on the skull's forehead, and the crossed long bones are replaced with a crossed trident and a shepherd's crook.

Unicode uses the sequence U+1F3F4 🏴 WAVING BLACK FLAG, U+200D ZERO WIDTH JOINER, U+2620 ☠ SKULL AND CROSSBONES to display the flag as a single emoji symbol, 🏴‍☠.

== As a sign of protest ==
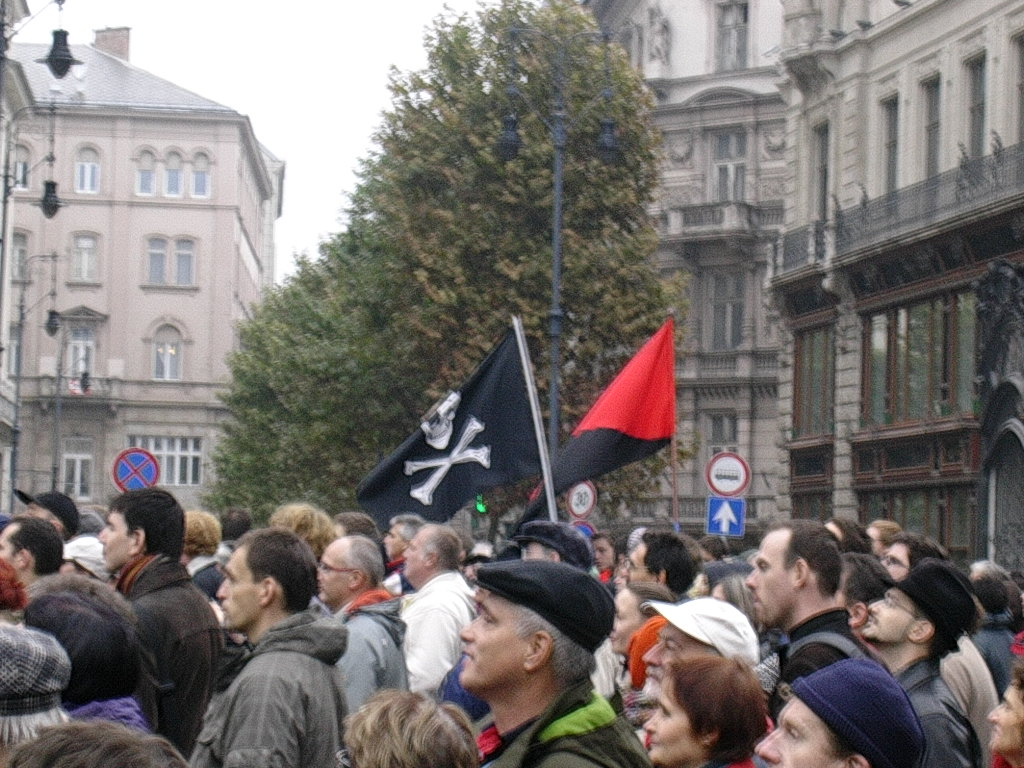
Anarchist and Pirate protest with the Jolly Roger flag in Hungary.

Soviet-Swiss chess master Viktor Korchnoi, a Soviet defector, offered to play under the Jolly Roger when he was denied the right to play under the Swiss flag, during the World Chess Championship 1978.

=== Straw Hat Pirates' Jolly Roger ===
The Straw Hat Pirates' Jolly Roger of the Straw Hat Pirates in One Piece came into prominence during the 2025 Indonesian anti-government protests, which started in the buildup to the August 17 when the country would celebrate its 80th independence anniversary. This flag was first flown by truck drivers in late July 2025 to protest the administration of Prabowo Subianto. They also refused to fly any Indonesian flags, as a part of the demonstration against the prohibition of ODOL (over dimension, overload) trucks throughout several cities in Java, ongoing since 19 June.

In response, the flag was called a threat to the national unity of Indonesia by its government, especially by the leading figures from People's Consultative Assembly. It has been also declared a symbol of treason and waving the flag is considered as an act of rebellion and sedition, while various government institutions have attempted to ban this flag.

In the 2025 Nepalese Gen Z protests, the Straw Hat Pirates' Jolly Roger was used as a sign of protest.

The Straw Hat Pirates Jolly Roger also showed up in Gaza war protests. Italian activist Tony la piccirella flew a Straw Hat Pirates Jolly Roger on the ship he was on as a part of the Global Sumud Flotilla intended to break the Gaza blockade.

== Sub-articles ==
- Bloody flag
- Crossed Swords Jolly Roger – fictional design
- Flag of Blackbeard
- Old Roger (Jolly Roger) – historical design

== See also ==
- Anarchist flag
  - Flags of the Makhnovshchina
  - Kronstadt rebellion & Soviet Republic of Naissaar (Flag of rebelling anarchist sailors being black with white skull and crossbones)
- Maritime flag
- Ossuary
- Pesthörnchen (CCC)
- Skull emoji
- Totenkopf
- VF-61, VF-84 and VF-103, US Navy fighter squadrons nicknamed "Jolly Rogers"

== Bibliography ==
=== Books ===
- Allaway, Jim (2004). Hero of the Upholder. Periscope Publishing. ISBN 1-904381-23-5.
- Admiralty (1997). His Majesty's Submarines. World War II Monographs. Vol. 401 (3rd ed.). Merriam Press.
- Compton-Hall, Richard (2004). Submarines at War 1939–45. Periscope Publishing. ISBN 1-904381-22-7.
- Mackay, Richard (September 2003). A Precarious Existence: British Submarines in World War I. Periscope Publishing. ISBN 1-904381-17-0.
- Simpson, Andy (3 January 2014). Why Would Anyone Want to Swing a Cat?: ... and 499 other questions. London: Constable & Robinson Ltd. pp. 163–64. ISBN 978-1849019477.
- Sumner, Ian (25 October 2001). The Royal Navy 1939–45. Osprey Publishing. ISBN 1-84176-195-8.
- Williamson, Gordon (2007). U-Boats Vs Destroyer Escorts: The Battle of the Atlantic. Duel Series. Vol. 3. Osprey Publishing. ISBN 978-1-84603-133-5.

=== Journal and news articles ===
- Norton-Taylor, Richard (17 April 2003). "Cruise missile sub back in UK". The Guardian. London.
- Richards, Bill; Smith, Peter (December 2006). "Onslow's Jolly Roger". Signals (77). Australian National Maritime Museum: 10–12. ISSN 1033-4688.

=== Websites ===
- Bartelski, Andrzej S. "Dzik – Operational history". Polish Navy Homepage 1939–1947. Polish Navy. Archived from the original on 31 March 2014.
- Bartelski, Andrzej S. "Sokol – Operational history". Polish Navy Homepage 1939–1947. Polish Navy. Archived from the original on 7 June 2011.
- "Submariners – Traditions and Values". Defence Jobs. Australian Defence Force. Archived from the original on 2 August 2008.
