= Christopher Moody =

British pirate

Christopher Moody (c. 1694-1722) was a pirate as a member of Bartholomew Roberts' crew but was never a captain in his own right. He is best known not for his own actions but for a popular Jolly Roger flag mis-attributed to him as well as for later authors confusing him with unrelated pirate William Moody.

== The real Christopher Moody ==
Christopher Moody was a member of Howell Davis's crew aboard the sloop Buck after Davis staged a mutiny, took over the vessel, and turned to piracy in 1718. Davis sailed to the western coast of Africa where he cooperated with fellow pirates Jeremiah Cocklyn and Olivier Levasseur. This was the only time the two Moodys potentially crossed paths: William Moody had recently ejected the quarrelsome Cocklyn but was in turn marooned by his own sailors. Davis was killed during an attempted raid on Principe and Roberts was elected Captain in his place.

Christopher Moody stayed with Roberts until they were caught by the Royal Navy ship Swallow in 1722. Witnesses at their trial described Moody as “behaving in a vile outrageous Manner, putting them in bodily Fears, sometimes for the Ship, and sometimes for themselves” and arguing with other forced crewmates. Another witness said that Moody “bully'd well among them who dar'd not make any Reply, but was very easy with his Friends, who knew him; for Moody, on this Occasion, took a large Glass from him, and threatened to blow his Brains out, (a favourite Phrase with these Pyrates) if he muttered at it.” After Moody was captured he was hanged at Cape Coast Castle in Cabo Corso, Ghana, with Thomas Sutton and other former members of Roberts' crew.

Though perpetrated by William Moody, other actions—that he commanded a ship or two and that he plundered vessels off the Carolina coast—have been ascribed to Christopher Moody. Period accounts such as the memorial by merchant William Snelgrave (who had been captured by Davis and Cocklyn) mention only the last name “Moody.” Later depositions from pirates put on trial make clear that the pirate captain active off the Carolinas aboard his ship Rising Sun was William Moody, later overthrown by Cocklyn.

== Moody's supposed Jolly Roger ==
The Jolly Roger popularly attributed to Christopher Moody

A distinct and unique Jolly Roger flag is often attributed to Christopher Moody. Instead of the traditional white on black, Moody's Jolly Roger is depicted as gold on red. It also has an hourglass with wings, to express to his victims that their time to live was flying away. In the middle is a white arm holding a dagger.

While popularly attributed to Christopher Moody, the flag may have been another pirate's, or may have been fictional. The flag had been described in the mid-18th century, but the first record of its being attributed to Christopher Moody appeared in 1933 in Gray's Pirates of the Eastern Seas. An artist's conception of the flag appears in Bradlee's "Piracy in the West Indies and its Suppression" (1923) but is dated to 1746, years after Moody died. Christopher Moody was never a Captain and so would not have had a flag of his own in any event.

== See also ==
- Chaloner Ogle - the Royal Navy captain who killed Bartholomew Roberts and captured his crew, including Christopher Moody
