= John Cole (pirate) =

John Cole (died 1718) was a pirate active off the American eastern seaboard. His brief career is associated with Richard Worley and William Moody. He is known more for the unusual cargo of his pirate ship than for his piracy.

== Biography ==
Flag as reported by crew of the Eagle, described as “[T]he said Pyrates hoisted a black Flagg with a humane Skelleton on it which so much terrified the Said Ship Eagle's Company, that the men not only refused to fight, but also hindered the Officers themselves in their Duty of Defending the said Ship.” Note that this may instead have been an alternate flag of Richard Worley's, who was Cole's Captain before Cole received his own captured vessel to command.

Governor Robert Johnson of the Province of South Carolina was worried about retaliatory attacks from pirates after the capture of Blackbeard’s associate Stede Bonnet. In October 1718 Johnson heard rumors that pirate William Moody was heading to Charles Town and commissioned four vessels to oppose him, including Stede Bonnet’s former ship Revenge. Scouts reported two ships anchored nearby and Johnson’s fleet sailed to meet them. The smaller sloop was not Moody; it had been the New York’s Revenge captained by Richard Worley, another pirate well-known in the Carolinas.

Eagle, the larger ship under John Cole, fled the battle with two of Johnson’s ships in pursuit. Cole had been given the Eagle after its capture in September, renaming it New York Revenge’s Revenge. It had been used as a ship’s tender to Worley’s vessel. Johnson’s fleet caught the Eagle a few hours later. Moody really may have been in the vicinity; later depositions from a sailor captured by Moody indicated that he’d heard of Johnson’s preparations and took a captured ship far offshore to plunder it before fleeing the area. Worley was killed in the fighting; Cole was tried, convicted, and hanged off Charles Town in November 1718 with the remainder of their crews. Johnson shared out the reward for capturing Cole and Worley among the four vessels’ crews.

The cargo of Cole’s New York Revenge’s Revenge turned out not to be treasure or trade goods: its hold was full of prisoners, including 36 women shipped from London and bound for Virginia to be sold as indentured servants. Many of the prisoners and crew had joined Worley and Cole’s pirates. At least one source reported that the women were to have been shipped to an island in the Bahamas, to start a new colony after being married off to English men, though the women perished aboard ship for lack of water and food.

== See also ==
- Christopher Moody – Unrelated to William Moody, though their exploits are often conflated; some sources name the Moody who avoided Johnson off South Carolina as "Christopher", though Christopher Moody was never a Captain in his own right.
