= William Moody (pirate) =

British pirate

- Died: 1719
- Piratical career
- Base of operations: Caribbean; Coast of Africa

William Moody (Note: William Moody should not be confused with the unrelated pirate Christopher Moody, who operated around the same time period and in some of the same areas. There is much confusion regarding the two; Christopher Moody was never a captain on his own, but was instead a sailor who served under Bartholomew Roberts.) (died 1719, last name occasionally Moudy) was a London-born pirate active in the Caribbean and off the coast of Africa. He is best known for his association with Olivier Levasseur and Thomas Cocklyn, crewmembers who succeeded him as captains in their own right.

== History ==
Flags associated with William Moody. Described as “A black Flag, having a white Man painted in it, with three Arrows, whose Points were turn’d toward a red Heart, and underneath it were some red Spots, resembling Blood” and “Heart pierc’d by an Arrow”.

Moody sailed the Caribbean as early as June 1718 in his ship Rising Sun, which had been called Resolution before it was captured by pirates, “mounted with 36 guns and having on board 130 men, white and black”. Moody sailed alongside Richard Frowd and another pirate, looting ships in the vicinity of St. Christophers. They alternately burned, stranded, and looted the ships they captured.

A “Captain Moody” was reported off the coast of the Carolinas in the autumn of 1718. Hearing rumors of his approach, and with his scouts reporting two suspicious vessels offshore, Governor Robert Johnson armed four ships to attack him. After capturing the two ships, Johnson instead found Richard Worley and John Cole. A sailor later reported that “Captain Moody” (presumably William) had heard of Johnson's fleet and fled farther from the coast to avoid him.

In December they took several ships near St. Thomas, holding their captains hostage and threatening to burn the ships if the islanders refused to resupply the pirates. Governor Hamilton was forced to request an additional warship from England, “the man of war that is on this station not being capable of doing any service against that vermin”.

In early 1719 Moody sailed for Sierra Leone on the African coast. As reported by captured sailor William Snelgrave, in the Cape Verde vicinity a group of Rising Sun’s sailors attempted a mutiny, led by Thomas Cocklyn. Moody put Cocklyn and 25 others ashore and denied them shares of plunder. Moody’s remaining crew resented his treatment of Cocklyn and returned the favor, forcing Moody and 12 of his supporters into a small boat and setting them adrift, where they were presumed to have been lost at sea. Frowd may not have been with Moody at the time, as he was not mentioned in Snelgrave’s otherwise detailed account. After disposing of Moody the crew elected Olivier Levasseur as captain. Levasseur's quartermaster was Paulsgrave Williams, who had earlier sailed with Samuel Bellamy, both of whom had sailed with Levasseur in early 1717. They rejoined the marooned sailors, who had overpowered a ship coming up the river and chosen Cocklyn to lead them. Snelgrave reported that they “chose Cocklyn for their commander because of his brutality, being determined they said, never again to have a gentleman commander such as Moody was.”

A General History of the Pyrates says Moody made his way back to New Providence to end his career, accepting the King's Pardon.

== See also ==
- Edward England – Several captains and / or ships associated with Moody eventually sailed with Edward England.
