= Walter Kennedy (pirate) =

English pirate

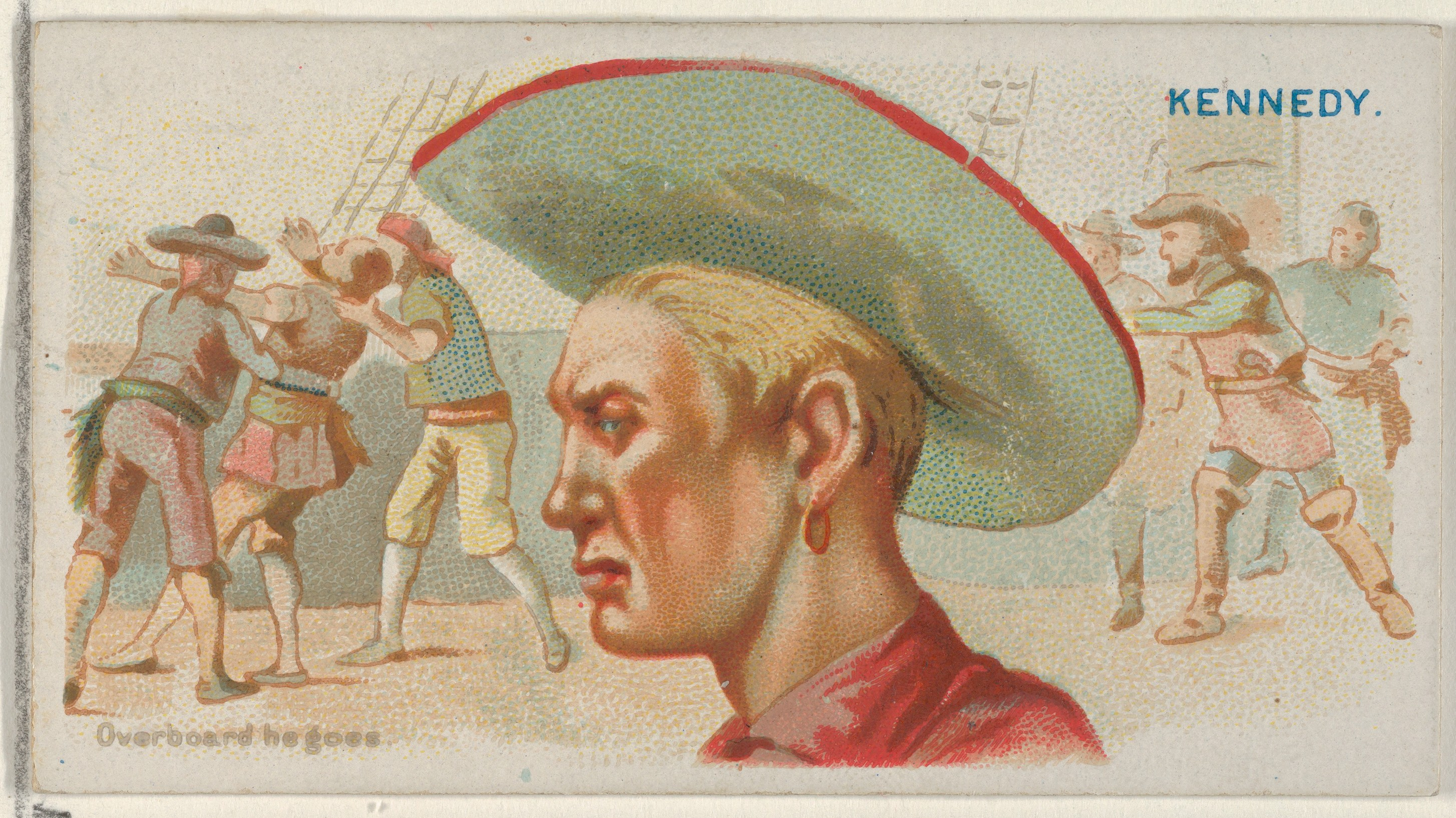
- Allen & Ginter cigarette card depicting Kennedy (c. 1888)
- Born: c. 1695; Wapping, Middlesex, England
- Died: 21 July 1721; Wapping, Middlesex, England
- Piratical career
- Type: Pirate
- Years active: c. 1718 - 21 July 1721
- Rank: Captain
- Base of operations: Caribbean Sea and West Africa
- Commands: Frigate Royal Rover
- Wealth: £18,500

Walter Kennedy (c. 1695 – 21 July 1721) was an English pirate who served as a crew member under Howell Davis and Bartholomew Roberts.

== Early life ==
Walter Kennedy was born in 1695 at a place called Pelican Stairs in Wapping, London. Possibly one or both of his parents were of Irish descent due to the fact that Bartholomew Roberts considered him to be Irish. Born to a poor family, Kennedy was illiterate and was known to have a bad temper. He was a burglar and pickpocket in London.

Later he became an apprentice to his father, who was an anchor smith; he carried out house-breaking in his spare time. His apprenticeship, however, came to an end with the death of his father and he decided to go to sea. He served in the Royal Navy during the War of the Spanish Succession, where he heard tales of pirates from Henry Morgan to Henry Every, and dreamed of becoming a pirate himself. He was a crew member on the sloop-of-war Buck, part of the fleet that Woodes Rogers took to the Republic of Pirates in the Bahamas in 1718 to suppress piracy there. Woodes sent the Buck to Havana with a letter for the Spanish governor assuring that official that he was not a pirate, but was in Nassau to suppress piracy. Some recently pardoned pirates were added to the crew of the Buck, and before it reached Havana they, along with some of the original crew, including Kennedy, mutinied, killing the captain, Jonathan Bass, and other crew members who did not join the mutiny.

Howell Davis, another mutineer, was elected captain. Kennedy was with Davis on the island of Principe when his party was ambushed by the Portuguese. He was the only member of the shore party to escape back to the ship alive. With Davis dead, Bartholomew Roberts was elected as his successor. Roberts and forty of the crew chased a possible prize in a captured sloop off the coast of Surinam.

== Captaincy ==
Walter Kennedy's Jolly Roger (which was identical to the flag of Jean Thomas Dulaien).There is no evidence of Kennedy flying this flag; after he mutinied against Bartholomew Roberts, Kennedy and the rest of the crew retired from piracy and sailed to Ireland.

Kennedy was left in charge of Roberts' ship, the Royal Rover, and a large part of its crew. He took advantage of this to abandon Roberts and proclaim himself captain. Under his leadership, the crew decided to give up piracy and to set sail for Ireland. However, Kennedy had no knowledge of navigation. When the crew found out, they threatened to throw him overboard, but did not carry the threat out since Kennedy was a man of great personal courage. Though his original destination was Ireland, Kennedy's poor navigation skills led them to land on the north-west coast of Scotland instead. The crew passed themselves off as shipwrecked mariners, but owing to their drinking and rioting in each village they came to, the whole countryside was soon roused. Seventeen of the crew were arrested near Edinburgh and put on trial for piracy; nine of them were hanged. Kennedy slipped away and reached Ireland. Having soon spent all his ill-gotten gains in Dublin, he came to Deptford where he is said to have kept a brothel. When one of his prostitutes accused him of theft, he was sent to Bridewell Prison, where he was denounced as a pirate by the mate of a ship he had taken. Kennedy was transferred to the Marshalsea prison and put on trial for piracy. He was hanged at Execution Dock on 21 July 1721.
