= Richard Worley (pirate) =

English pirate (died 1718/19)

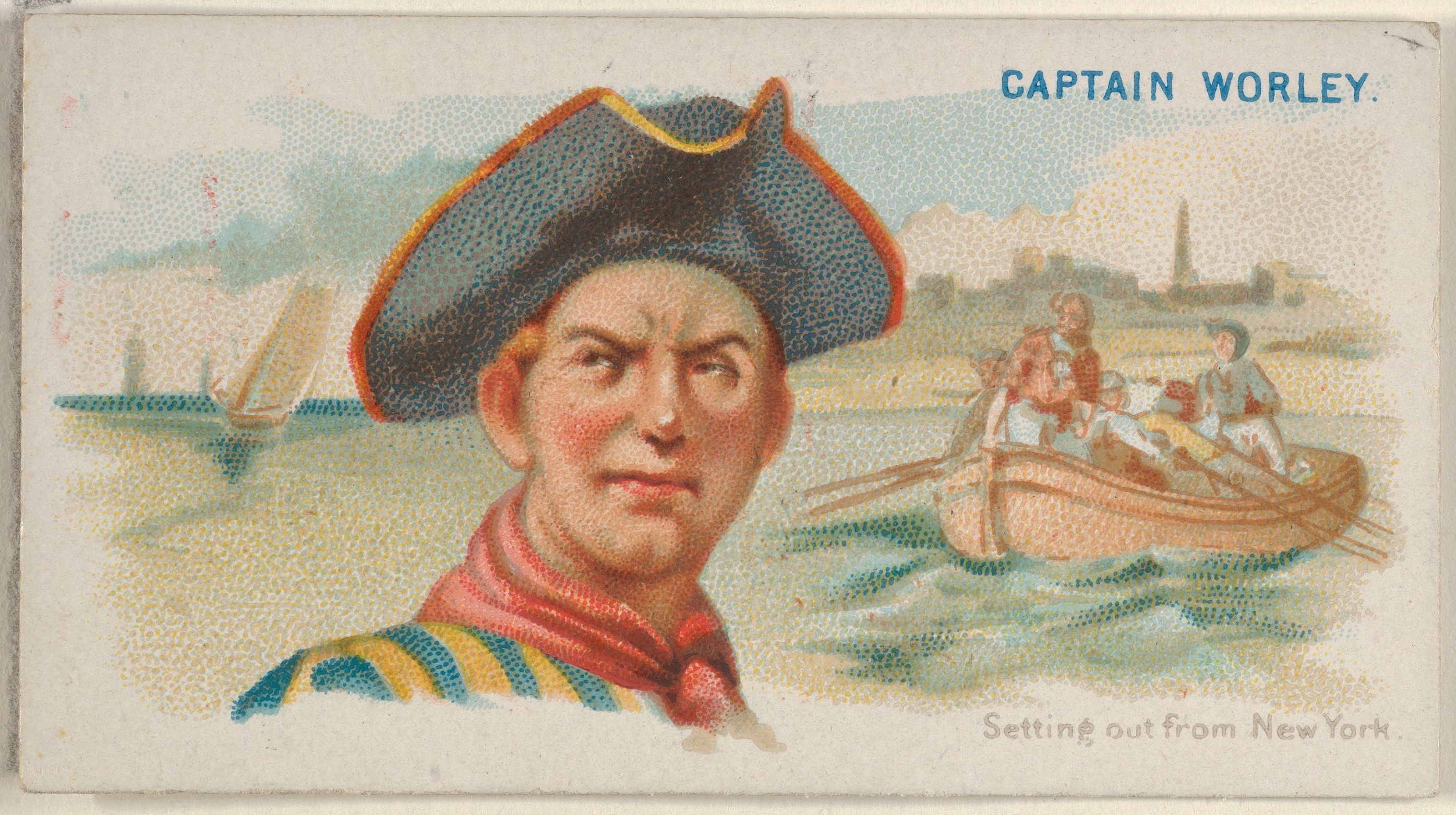
- Born: Kingdom of England
- Died: 1718/19; Province of South Carolina, American Colonies
- Piratical career
- Type: pirate
- Base of operations: East Coast of the American colonies

Worley's flag design, a variant of the "Jolly Roger"

Worley's alternate flag design, described as “black Flagg with a humane Skelleton on it which so much terrified”

Richard Worley (died 1718/19) was a pirate who was active in the Caribbean Sea and the East Coast of the American Colonies during the early 18th century.

== Piracy ==
He is first recorded leaving New York with a small boat and a crew of eight men hoping to make their fortune in the so-called Golden Age of Piracy. However, their first prize resulted in the capture of household goods from a shallop in the Delaware River near New Castle in September 1718. This attack was technically burglary rather than piracy, as according to British maritime law at the time the attack did not take place in international waters. Local authorities mistakenly attributed the attack to Worley's better-known counterpart Blackbeard, who had raided the same waterways earlier in the year. Vessels were armed and sent to intercept the robbers but, after cruising for several days without setting sight on Worley, returned empty-handed.

Their second prize brought better luck as, upon capturing a sloop bound for Philadelphia, Worley also gained four additional crew members. A few days later they requisitioned another sloop bound for Hull which, as well as being in better condition, was fully provisioned which they had desperate need of.

They left the Delaware and set out to sea to the Bahamas, however, King George I issued a royal proclamation for the capture and execution of pirates who chose not to accept a royal pardon from the British government. Although the 24-gun warship HMS Phoenix was sent out after Worley, he and his crew were able to evade capture.

== Sailing the Spanish Main ==
After six weeks off the Bahamas, he captured a brigantine and a sloop, increased his crew to about twenty-five and gained six cannons and numerous small arms. The brigantine was released, but the sloop sunk, to prevent it from returning to its home port of New York where it would raise alarm. It was during this time that he began flying his official colors of a black flag with a white Death's Head in its centre and the crew agreed upon a set of articles, which included a vow to fight to the death rather than surrender to authorities.

== Capture ==
Worley's ship New York's Revenge was sailing alongside a second larger ship under captain John Cole called New York Revenge’s Revenge. Cole's ship had been the prisoner transport Eagle, captured by Worley off Virginia the previous month. South Carolina Governor Robert Johnson sent four ships after Worley and Cole; the pirate hunters split up and chased them down separately, capturing Cole some hours after Worley when Cole tried to flee the battle. Cole's ship was still carrying prisoners, including 36 women destined to be sold into indentured servitude.

Two separate accounts of Worley's demise exist; one in Captain Charles Johnson's original book and a subsequent one sent to Johnson by an eyewitness.

=== Johnson's original account ===
Worley soon prepared to make his return to the colonies, where others such as Blackbeard and Stede Bonnet were enjoying success off Virginia and the Carolinas. When Worley pulled into an inlet near Charleston, South Carolina to clean his ship, the Governor was informed of his presence and sent two provincial naval sloops against him, one fitted with eight guns and the other with six. Worley set sail and the sloops followed him north to the coast of Virginia to Jamestown, Virginia. A later version of The General History corrected this location, and said the engagement that took Worley's life was in Charleston, S.C. (Charles Town at the time). Upon seeing what he assumed were two merchant ships, he hoisted his black flag, causing much alarm amongst the Jamestown residents, who thought they were to be attacked by not one but three pirate ships, and beat to arms to defend themselves.

Worley fired a shot at the sloops, but as they drew near he realised his mistake and he and his crew prepared to follow their vow and to all fight to the death. One sloop fired a broadside and drew up to his quarter and the other to his bow before boarding. Worley and his crew, outnumbered by three to one, drew up on the deck to fight a bloody last stand. All were killed bar Worley and one other, who were both severely wounded, and brought ashore in irons. They were hanged the next day (17 Feb 1719) in public to ensure they received a very visible punishment and didn't instead die of their wounds hidden in jail.

=== Eyewitness account ===
In October 1718 the Governor of Charles Town, Robert Johnson was informed that a pirate ship commanded by Capt. William Moody (but actually commanded by Worley) had been sighted off the bar of Charles Town and carried fifty guns and two hundred men. The Governor and his council decided to commandeer the 30-gun King William galley, the 24-gun Mediterranean galley, the eight-gun Revenge sloop (formerly belonging to Stede Bonnet) and a six-gun sloop Sea Nymph to attack the pirate and offered a share of their cargo as incentive.

Canoes from South Carolina's scout boat navy were sent out to track the pirate and to prevent him from entering Charles Town port. Several weeks passed before a ship and a sloop approached the harbour, weighed anchor and signalled for a pilot. None was sent as they suspected it to be Moody and several days elapsed during which time the pirates attempted to land on Sullivan's Island to find fresh water, but were obstructed by the scout ships.

The Governor decided that his fleet of four ships and 300 men was a match for the pirate ship and sloop so sailed towards them with his soldiers and arms concealed. As they neared the pirate sloop it raised its black flag, started to manoeuvre and was soon copied by the pirate ship. When the Governor's fleet came within range he hoisted his colours and his men rushed upon the decks and gave the pirates a broadside who immediately tried to run. The pirate sloop was pummelled with broadsides and most of its men fled into the hold with the exception of Worley and a few others who died in the cross-fire upon deck.

The other pirate ship was boarded and found to be a convict ship formerly called the Eagle which had been sailing from London to Virginia with convicts but had been captured by Worley. It carried a hundred or more men who had joined the pirate and were taken ashore and hanged. Thirty convict women were also on board and it was decided to send them to the Bahamas but they died through lack of provisions before this could be done.

As for Moody, according to A General History of the Pyrates he received word of the Governor's fleet and set sail for New Providence and was to later accept the 1718 King's pardon; other sources have Moody active as a pirate as late as November 1718. The Governor disbanded his fleet and shared out the booty between his men.

== Bibliography ==
- Johnson, Charles (1725). A General History of the Pyrates. Vol. I (3 ed.). London: T.Warner.
- Johnson, Charles (1726). A General History of the Pyrates. Vol. II. London: T.Woodward.
- Johnson, Charles (1999). Schonhorn, Manuel (ed.). A General History of the Pyrates. Mineola, N.Y.: Dover Pubs Inc.
