= James Moore Jr. =

Governor of South Carolina from 1719 to 1721

His Excellency James Moore Jr.

20th Governor of South Carolina
- In office December 21, 1719 – May 30, 1721
- Monarch: George I
- Preceded by: Robert Johnson
- Succeeded by: Francis Nicholson

James Moore Jr. was (c. 1682–March 3, 1724) was the governor of South Carolina from 1719 to 1721.

== Biography ==
James Moore Jr. was born in South Carolina, c. 1682 to James and Margaret (née Berringer) Moore.

== South Carolina Revolution of 1719 ==
- Butler, Ph.D., Nic. "Proprietary vs. Royal Government in Colonial South Carolina". Charleston Time Machine. Charleston County Public Library.
- Towles, Louis P. "Revolution of 1719". South Carolina Encyclopedia. University of South Carolina, Institute for Southern Studies.
- Butler, Ph.D., Nic. "The South Carolina Revolution of 1719, Part 1". Charleston Time Machine. Charleston County Public Library.
- Butler, Ph.D., Nic. "The South Carolina Revolution of 1719, Part 2". Charleston Time Machine. Charleston County Public Library.

Preceded by Robert Johnson	Governor of South Carolina; 1719 to 1721	Succeeded by Francis Nicholson
