= Emanuel Wynn =

17th-century French pirate

Emanuel Wynn (Note: First name also Emmanuel, last name occasionally Wynne.) (fl. 1700) was a French pirate of the 17th century who is often considered the first pirate to fly the Jolly Roger.

== History ==
British Admiralty Records, in the Public Records Office in the UK show, in a report dated 18 July 1700, that HMS Poole, a 32-gun fifth-rate frigate commanded by Captain John Cranby, engaged Wynn's ship off the Cape Verde islands. Cranby chased Wynn into a cove at Brava Island (Note: Some sources locate the skirmish at St. Jago instead.) where Wynn was able to hold out. Cranby enlisted the assistance of Portuguese soldiers, but thanks to their delay in attacking, Wynn slipped out of the harbor and escaped.

== Wynn's Jolly Roger Flag ==
Emanuel Wynn's flag

Most historians agree that Cranby's journal is the first witness account of a black Jolly Roger used aboard ship, which Cranby described as "a sable ensign with cross bones, a death's head, and an hour glass" (the quotation is from Earle, Pirate Wars, p. 154) or "A Sable Flag with a White Death's Head and Crossed Bones in the Fly." Wynne is believed to be the first pirate to fly the now familiar form of the jolly roger. His flag, showing the distinctive skull and crossbones motif, was augmented with another common pirate symbol: an hourglass, meant to signify to his prey that their time was running out and only by timely surrender could they evade death. There were no other reports at the time of pirates using similar flags aboard ship (though red and other versions had been used by buccaneers during campaigns while ashore) but within 15 years the skull and crossbones design and its many variants would become the standard flag of Golden Age pirates.

== See also ==
- Bartholomew Roberts, who was known to have flown not just one but several different Jolly Roger flags.
