= Howell Davis =

Welsh pirate (1690-1719)

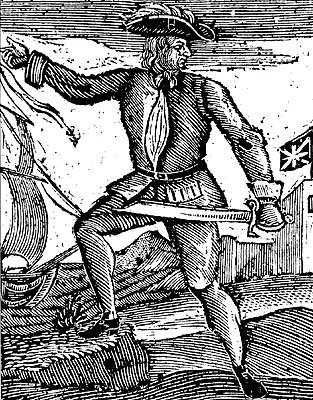
- An engraving of Davis in a 1728 edition of A General History of the Pyrates.
- Born: c. 1690; Milford Haven, Pembrokeshire, Wales
- Died: 19 June 1719; Príncipe
- Piratical career
- Nickname: Dave or Davies
- Type: Pirate
- Years active: 18 July 1718 – 19 June 1719
- Rank: Captain
- Base of operations: Caribbean Sea and West Africa
- Commands: Frigate Cadogan; Sloop-O-War Buck; Sloop-O-War Saint James; Frigate Royal Rover

Howell Davis (also spelled Hywel and Davies; c. 1690 – 19 June 1719) was a Welsh pirate. His piratical career lasted 11 months, from July 1718 to June 1719, when he was ambushed and killed. He captured 15 known British and French ships. His ships were the Cadogan, Buck, Saint James, and Rover.

== Piracy ==
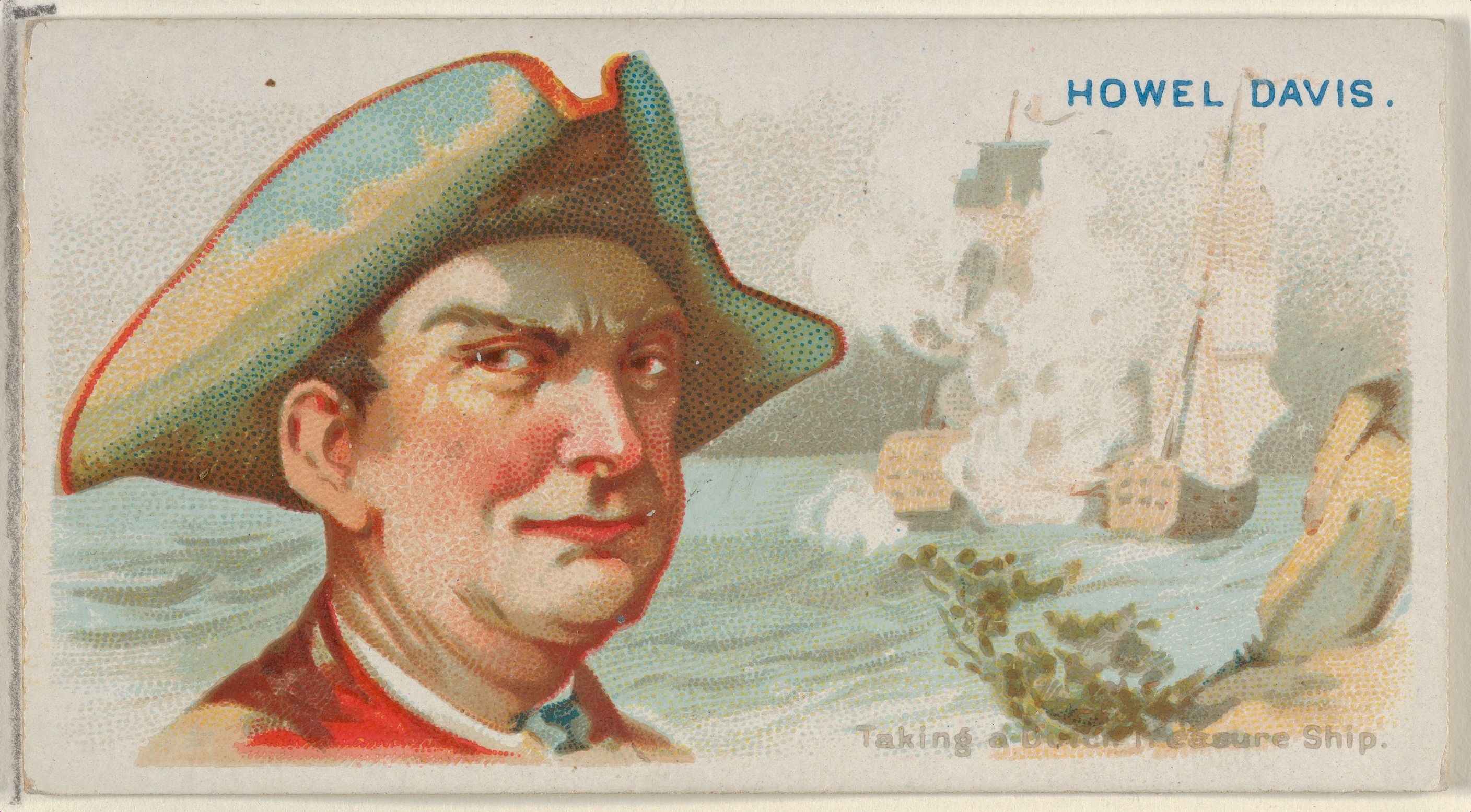
Howell Davis, Taking a Dutch Treasure Ship, from the Pirates of the Spanish Main series (N19) for Allen & Ginter Cigarettes MET DP835011

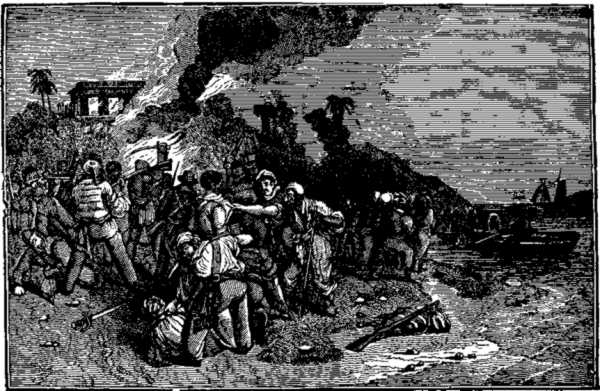
The death of Captain Davis in an ambush on Principe

Born in Milford Haven, Pembrokeshire, Wales, Davis started out in piracy on 11 July 1718 when the slave ship Cadogan, on which he was serving as a mate, was captured by the pirate Edward England. Deciding to join the pirates, Davis was given command of the Cadogan and set out for Brazil on 18 July 1718. However, his crew mutinied and sailed to Barbados instead. Here Davis was imprisoned on the charge of piracy, but was eventually released and sought shelter in the pirate den of New Providence in the Bahamas. With New Providence being cleaned out by Governor Woodes Rogers, Davis left on the sloop Buck and conspired with six other crew members, who included Thomas Anstis and Walter Kennedy, to take over the vessel off Martinique. Davis was elected captain and conducted raids from his base at Coxon's Hole.

Subsequently, he crossed the Atlantic to terrorize shipping in the Cape Verde Islands. One of the prizes he took there became the new flagship of Davis's pirate fleet, the 26-gun Saint James. He then formed a partnership with a French pirate Olivier Levasseur, known as La Buse, and another pirate captain, Thomas Cocklyn, which lasted until they fell out in a drunken argument. Transferring to the 32-gun Rover, Davis sailed south and captured more rich prizes off the Gold Coast. One of his prisoners was fellow Welshman Bartholomew Roberts, who was destined to become even more famous as a pirate, as well as Thomas Sutton, who would sail alongside Roberts for his entire pirate career.

Davis pretended to be a legitimate privateer to deceive the commander of a Royal African Company slaving fort in Gambia. After capturing the commander at a welcoming dinner, Davis held him for ransom and gained 2,000 pounds in gold.

He once seized a more powerful French vessel by flying a black pirate flag from another large but lightly armed ship he had recently taken. The French ship quickly surrendered, thinking she was outgunned.

However, when he tried his pretence of being a Royal Navy pirate hunter in order to kidnap the governor of the Portuguese island of Príncipe, the governor saw through it. Davis was invited to call at the fort for a glass of wine. On the way there, the pirates were ambushed and Davis shot dead on 19 June 1719. Bartholomew Roberts was elected to succeed him and raided the island in retaliation later that night.

== Davis's flags ==
An artistic interpretation of the death's head flag as described by Edward Green.

Artistic interpretation of the flag from other descriptions.

Artistic interpretation of the flag from other descriptions.

There are known descriptions of three black flags used by Davis.

An account from The Information of Edward Green published on 29 April 1721:

hoysted up a black flag with a Death’s head and fired several Guns at the said Ship and took her within Sight of the said Island. And the said sloop was called the Duke and Duchess and was commanded by Howell Davis and mounted with ten Guns and had 70 Men on board or thereabouts.

Other descriptions:

their Standard, which they hoisted at Main-topmast-head, with a Gun and Sword

represented a man asleep and a skeleton with one hand a clock, a sword of the other

== Character ==
Captain William Snelgrave, the master of the Bird, a vessel captured by the pirates in 1719, later wrote an account of his experience. His ship was taken by Thomas Cocklyn's men, who abused him. However, when informed of this, Davis protected Snelgrave and obviously made a favourable impression on him. Snelgrave concluded that Davis was a man "who (allowing for the Course of Life he had been unhappily engaged in) was a most generous humane Person".

== In popular culture ==
The legend of Howell Davis has inspired recent works of fiction such as The Noble Pirates by R. Laham.

Howell Davis makes a minor appearance in Ubisoft's 2013 game Assassin's Creed IV: Black Flag, where his ship is tracked by protagonist Edward Kenway, who is seeking Bartholomew Roberts. When Kenway arrives in Príncipe, he discovers Davis's shot corpse, and then makes a partnership with Roberts and kills the two corsairs responsible for Davis's death, John Cockram and Josiah Burgess. Later in the game, Roberts wears Howell's costume.
