= Robert Johnson (governor) =

American politician from South Carolina

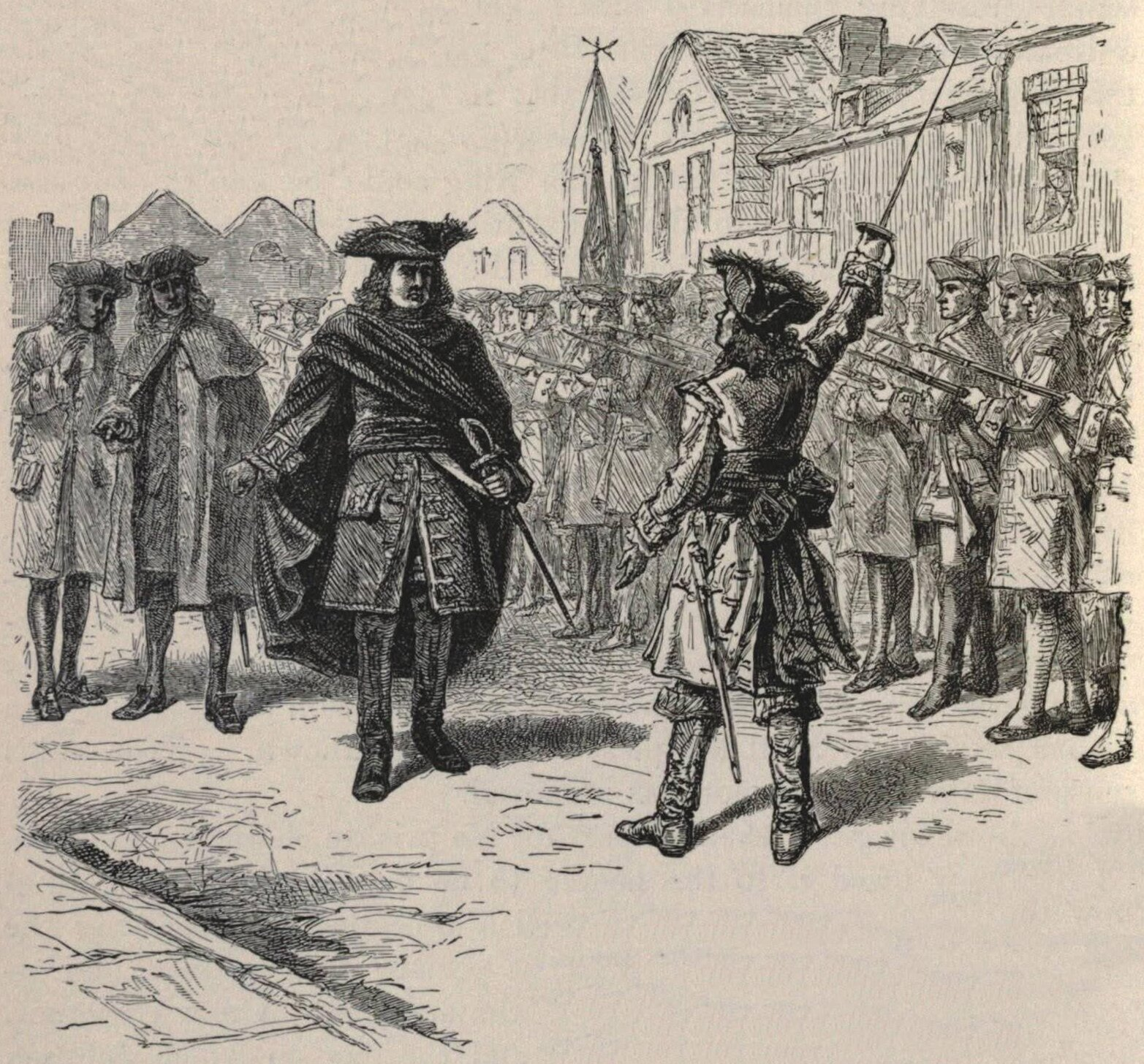
- Johnson (center-left) during the Revolution of 1719

Governor of South Carolina
- In office 1717 – December 21, 1719
- Monarch: George I
- Preceded by: Robert Daniell
- Succeeded by: James Moore Jr.
- In office December 15, 1730 – May 3, 1735
- Monarch: George II
- Preceded by: Arthur Middleton
- Succeeded by: Thomas Broughton

Personal details
- Born: 1682 Province of South Carolina
- Died: May 3, 1735 (aged 52–53) Charlestown, Province of South Carolina
- Resting place: Saint Philip's Episcopal Church, Charleston, South Carolina
- Occupation: Colonial administrator

Robert Johnson (1682 – 3 May 1735) served as the governor of South Carolina from 1717 to 1719 and from 1729 to 1735. Johnson ordered Colonel William Rhett to engage the notorious pirate Stede Bonnet's sloops in the Battle of Cape Fear River with the Charleston Militia on sea in 1718. His grandson was South Carolina Senator Ralph Izard.

== Life ==
Robert Johnson was the son of Sir Nathaniel Johnson and inherited a considerable estate from his father. On April 30, 1717, he was commissioned governor of South Carolina. Like his father, he soon won the confidence of the people, but coming at a time when the powers of the proprietors were already tottering, he was baffled in his efforts to conciliate the colonists, by the proprietors' own greed and folly, and in his endeavors to sustain their authority he lost whatever influence he might have exercised.

== Settling the Frontier ==
During his time as governor Johnson oversaw an innovative new approach to settling the South Carolina frontier with the hope of providing a buffer between Native Americans in the west and Charles Towne on the east coast. This "Township Scheme" was essentially a government subsidized settlement plan that involved the creation of townships which were treated as mini-colonies, each comprising about 20,000 acres. New settlers would be given 50 acres a piece and once a township had reached 100 settlers it would be given two seats in South Carolina's Commons House of Assembly. Townships created under this program were Purrysburg, New Windsor, Fredericksburg, Queensborough, Kingston, Amelia, Williamsburg, Saxe Gotha, Welsh Tract, and Orangeburg.

== Pirate Wars ==
Coat of Arms of Robert Johnson

Johnson oversaw the suppression of the pirates who were preying upon the commerce of South Carolina and neighboring colonies. Fitting out an expedition, he personally commanded a victorious engagement with them off the bar of Charleston, and carried on the campaign until they were exterminated and their famous leader Stede Bonnet was captured and executed. A month or two later Johnson is also credited with the killing of a second pirate, Richard Worley.

In 1719, when the proprietary government was overthrown, the revolutionary convention, of which Arthur Middleton was president, requested him to continue in office if he would agree to administer it in the name of the king, but Johnson declined to do so, asserting the rights of the proprietors to whom he owed allegiance. James Moore Jr. was thereupon elected governor by the convention, and Johnson was set aside.

Notwithstanding the loyalty thus shown to the proprietors, he was appointed first regular royal governor of the colony on December 9, 1729, and upon his arrival at Charleston, early in 1731, was joyfully received by the people. His administration was marked by the issuance of several acts regarding the granting of land to new settlers, and by a protracted boundary dispute with North Carolina, the two colonies being for the first time constituted entirely separate provinces. He aided James Oglethorpe in the settlement of Georgia by providing food and escort to his colonists. Johnson endeared himself to the people by his high-minded character, which won for him the title of the "good governor". He remained in office till his death, which took place in Charleston on May 3, 1735. In the same year the general assembly erected a monument to his memory in St. Philip's Church, where it remained until the edifice was burned in 1835.

== Legacy ==
Johnson Square in Savannah, Georgia, is named for him.
