= William Snelgrave =

English sailor and slave trader (1681–1743)

William Snelgrave (1681–1743) was an English sea captain, slave trader, and ivory trader on the West African coast.

== Slave trader ==
Snelgrave began transporting slaves with his father, William Snelgrave Sr., who was a first-mate on the Eagle. The elder Snelgrave died in Virginia in 1704. Upon his father's death, Snelgrave soon became a ship captain making numerous voyages including transport of 367 slaves to Virginia in 1720.

In 1727, he arrived at Whydah, which had just been captured by Dahomey.

In 1734, he published A New Account of Some Parts of Guinea and the Slave-Trade. The book includes a justification and defence of the slave trade, as well as descriptions of local kings as ludicrous and an account of him enslaving a child to prevent him from being sacrificed. He dedicated his book to the European merchants of West Africa.

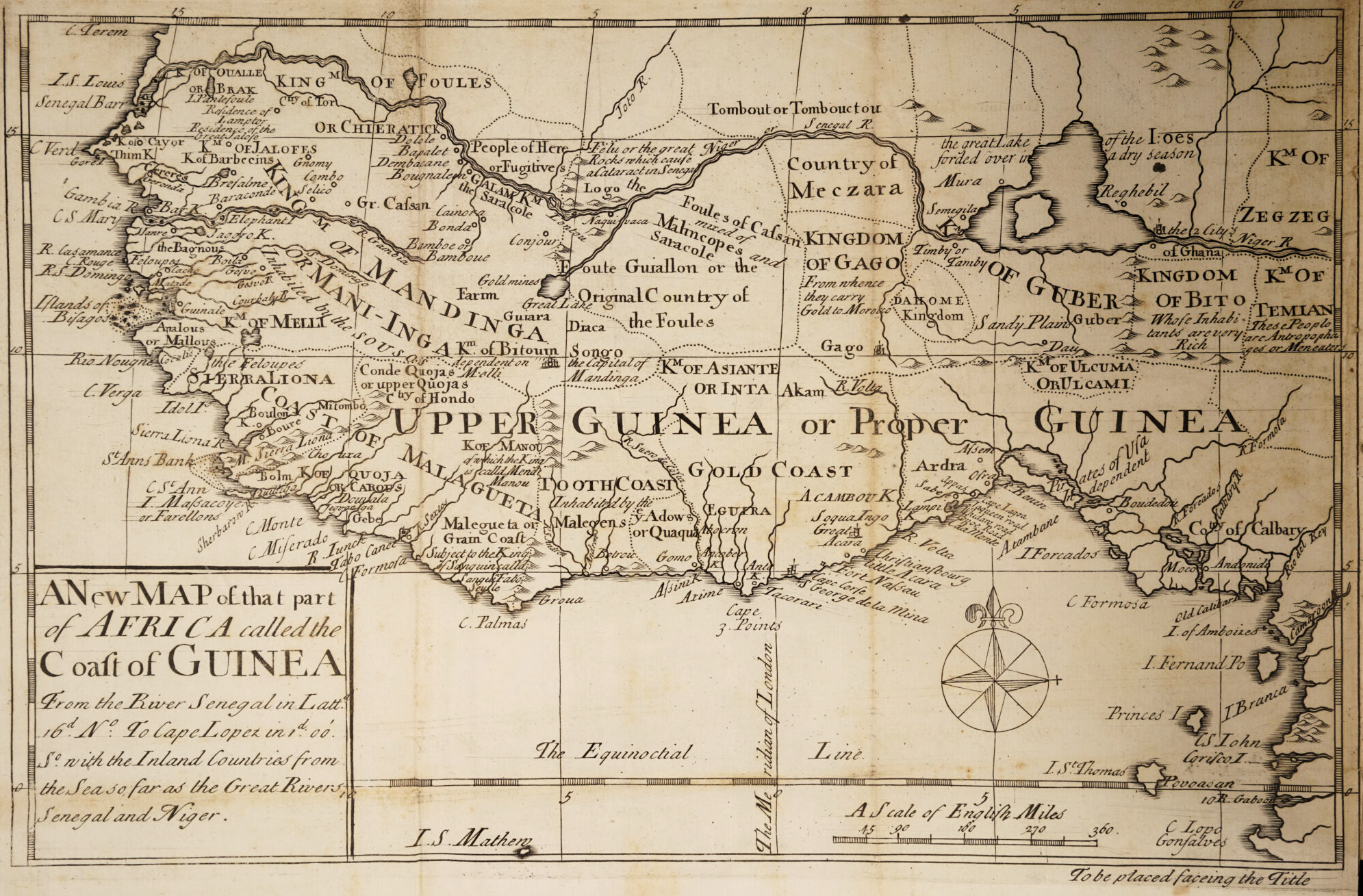
Map of the coast of Guinea from the Senegal River to Cape Lopez by Captain William Snelgrave, 1754

== Capture by pirates ==
Snelgrave and his crew were captured by pirates on 1 April 1719, while their vessel was anchored in the mouth of the Sierra Leone River in West Africa. The 45 sailors on board were taken by surprise when a small pirate band led by Thomas Cocklyn pulled alongside and scaled the side of their ship. Snelgrave ordered the crew to resist, but he was ignored. Instead, he was seized by one of the pirates who "with the but-end [of a pistol] endeavoured to beat out my brains." Some of the crew eventually intervened to beg that the pirates not kill their captain, upon which the badly injured Snelgrave was dragged before Cocklyn who told him his wounds were simply "the fortunes of war." Additional pirate vessels arrived over the course of the day, led by captains Howell Davis and Olivier Levasseur. On boarding Snelgrave's ship Davis apologised for the injuries inflicted by Cocklyn's men, saying they had become pirates to revenge themselves on cruel ship's commanders whereas "no one of my people gave me the least ill character ... it was plain they loved me."

== Sources ==
- Law, Robin. "A Neglected Account of the Dahomian Conquest of Whydah (1727): The 'Relation de la Guerre de Juda' of the Sieur Ringard of Nantes" in History of Africa, 15 (1988), p. 321-338.
