= Thomas Cocklyn =

18th-century English pirate

Jeremiah Cocklyn, better known by the name Thomas Cocklyn (Note: Last name occasionally spelled Cocklin. His first name is nearly always listed as “Thomas” in later books, but eyewitness accounts and trial documents make clear that his actual given name was Jeremiah.) (fl. 1717–1719), was an English pirate known primarily for his association with Howell Davis, Olivier Levasseur, Richard Taylor, and William Moody.

== History ==
Flags used by Thomas Cocklyn, described as “St. George’s cross with four balls in the quarter”., “the skeleton of a human body such as Death used to be represented by, and in the other Side a morthead with two bones across and a sandglass…” and “a Man’s arm with a dagger in his hand and on the other side a morthead and glass…”.

Cocklyn was among the hundreds of pirates who accepted a royal pardon when new Governor Woodes Rogers arrived in the Bahamas in 1718. He soon returned to piracy: in early 1719 near Cape Verde aboard Rising Sun, a group of William Moody's sailors led by Cocklyn attempted a mutiny. Moody marooned Cocklyn and 25 others, denying them shares of treasure. Moody's crew, angry over his treatment of Cocklyn, returned the favor by setting Moody and 12 of his supporters adrift in a small boat. The Rising Sun’s crew elected French pirate Olivier Levasseur as captain. They returned to meet the marooned sailors, who had overpowered a ship on the river and chosen Cocklyn as their leader. William Snelgrave, one of their captives, reported that they “chose Cocklyn for their commander because of his brutality, being determined they said, never again to have a gentleman commander such as Moody was.”

Soon met by Howell Davis near the Sierra Leone River, the group captured a number of vessels in quick succession, including Snelgrave's Bird Galley. The pirates exchanged ships several times, each keeping best of the lot, finally leaving the captured snow Bristol to Snelgrave and his crew. (Note: Snelgrave later wrote a lengthy and detailed recollection of his captivity and further voyages.) Snelgrave had been fond of Davis, who protected him, but was wary of the cruelty of Cocklyn, having witnessed him caning his own sailors and torturing captives and slaves. Cocklyn and his 25 men took Snelgrave's Bird, renaming it Windham Galley. (Note: Cocklyn later renamed it Speedwell, later Courage, and possibly other names as well, leading to some confusion regarding which of the captains had which ship at any one time, and whether they were the original ships or renamed prizes.) This showed the Jacobite sympathies of Cocklyn and Levasseur, both of whom named their ships (Windham Galley and Duke of Ormond, respectively) after prominent supporters of the exiled James Stuart.

The three captains eventually quarrelled and went their separate ways. Cocklyn continued his piracies off the African coast through 1719, operating alongside Richard Taylor. By 1720 he was at Madagascar; at least one source reported that Cocklyn died there, with captaincy of his recently captured ship Victory going to Richard Taylor, who afterwards sailed with Levasseur, Edward England, and Jasper Seagar. Another source reports that Cocklyn was hanged for piracy.

== See also ==
- Paulsgrave Williams - Former pirate captain, later Levasseur's quartermaster; he had earlier sailed with Samuel Bellamy, who had also sailed with Levasseur in early 1717.
