= 1721 in piracy =

See also 1720 in piracy, other events in 1721, 1722 in piracy and Timeline of piracy.

== Events ==
=== Atlantic Ocean ===
- November 15 - Philip Roche leads a bloody mutiny aboard an Irish ship and turns to piracy.

=== Caribbean Sea ===
- Undated (after April 18) - Thomas Anstis plunders 5-6 ships in the Caribbean, his men raping and murdering one female captive.
- Undated (after June 13) - George Lowther plunders several ships in the vicinity of Hispaniola.

=== Indian Ocean ===
- April 8 - John Taylor and Olivier Levasseur capture the Nossa Senhora do Cabo at Réunion island, robbing the returning Viceroy of India, Luís Carlos Inácio Xavier de Meneses, 1st Marquis of Louriçal, of diamonds and other treasures worth £800,000.

=== West Africa ===
- April 18 - Captain Thomas Anstis with 70 men and a brigantine deserts Bartholomew Roberts to start his own piratical career.
- June 13 - George Lowther leads a mutiny aboard the Gambia Castle, renames her the Happy Delivery, and draws up articles of piracy for his crew.
- August - Bartholomew Roberts captures the Onslow at Sestos, near Cape Coast Castle. Roberts shifts his flag aboard the Onslow, renaming her the Royal Fortune.
- Undated (August or later) - Roberts' men attack and disperse 2,000 local tribesmen at Calabar.

== Deaths ==
- March 29 - Charles Vane hanged for piracy at Gallows Point, Port Royal, Jamaica (born c. 1680.
- July 19 - Walter Kennedy hanged for piracy in London.
