= 1722 in piracy =

See also 1721 in piracy, 1723 in piracy and Timeline of piracy.

This article covers 1722 in piracy.

== Events ==
=== Caribbean Sea ===
- March - English ship Greyhound Galley seized and robbed by Spaniards.
- March–April - Matthew Luke, an Italian guarda costa privateer, plunders four British vessels, killing all aboard.
- May - Luke attacks English war vessel HMS Lanceston, mistaking it for a merchant ship. He and his crew are captured and brought to Jamaica, where all but seven of his crew are hanged.
- August - Under the command of Thomas Anstis, John Fenn's ship, the Morning Star, wrecks on Grand Cayman.

=== West Africa ===
- February 5 - Bartholomew Roberts' consort vessel, Ranger, captured by Chaloner Ogle.
- February 10 - Roberts' ship, Royal Fortune, is overtaken and defeated by Ogle in HMS Swallow. Roberts is killed and his crew is captured.
- March 28 - 52 of Roberts' pirates are sentenced to death at Cape Coast Castle.

== Deaths ==
=== Bartholomew Roberts' Crew ===
In total, 118 pirates in Roberts' crew die after being defeated by Chaloner Ogle.

14 crew members are killed on board Roberts' vessels during the battle with Ogle:

- February 5 - 10 killed on vessel Ranger
- February 10 - 3 killed on vessel Royal Fortune
- February 10 - Bartholomew Roberts, who reportedly robbed 470 vessels in his career, killed in action off Cape López.

104 of Roberts' pirates are executed or killed by the Vice Admiralty Court:

- 52 crew members, including Christopher Moody, Israel Hynde (maybe Israel Hands), are executed by hanging on April 3–20 at Cape Coast Castle.
- 15 crew members die of wounds en route to Cape Coast Castle.
- 4 crew members die in the castle dungeons while awaiting trial and/or hanging.
- 13 of 17 members sentenced to Marshalsea Prison die during the passage to London.
- All 20 members sentenced to 7 years of labor in the Cape Coast mines die before finishing their sentence.
- 1 of 2 members with respited guilty sentences dies (unknown if by execution or natural causes).
