= John Phillips (pirate) =

English pirate captain (died 1724)

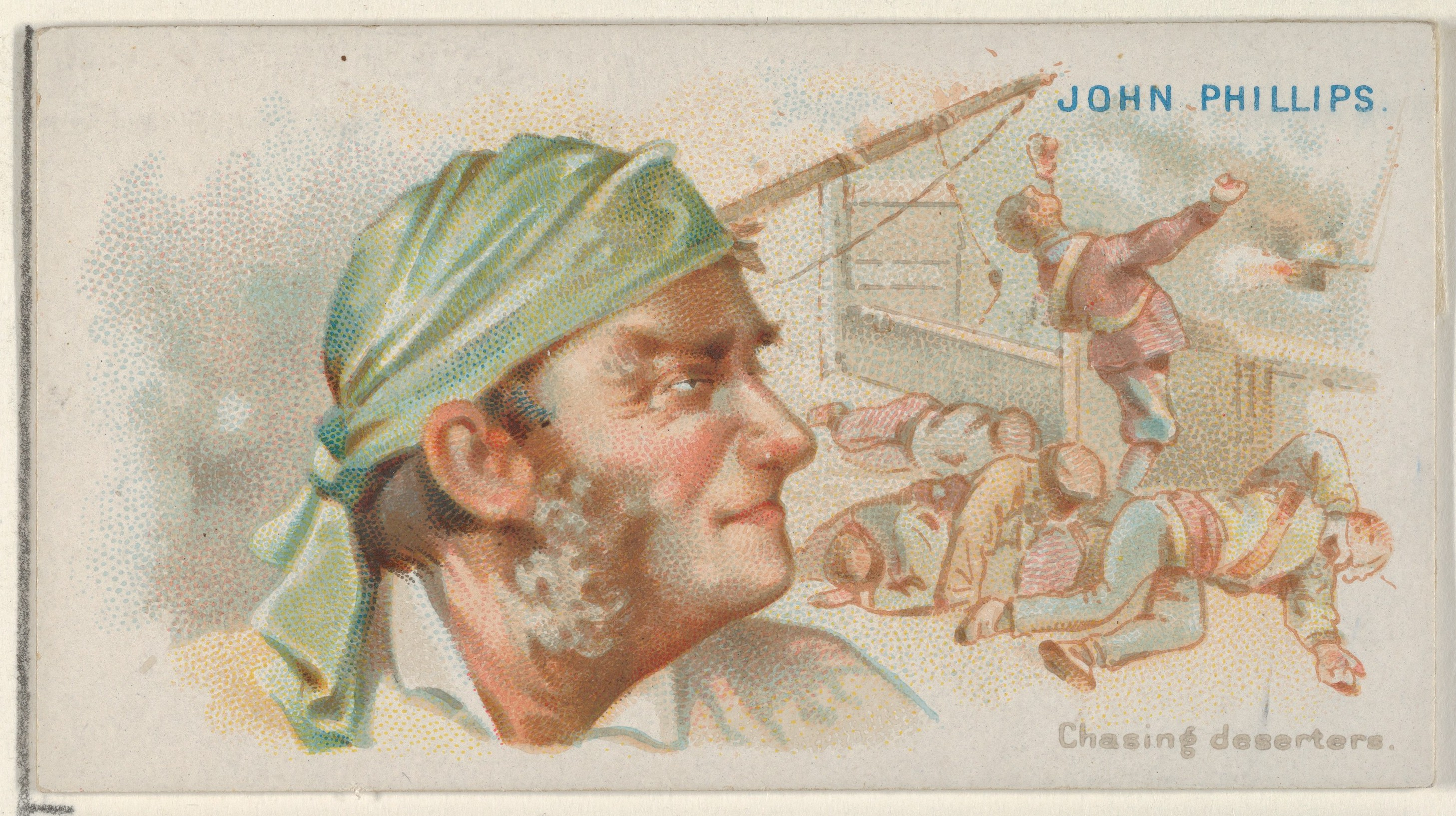
- John Phillips, Chasing Deserters, from the Pirates of the Spanish Main series (N19) for Allen & Ginter Cigarettes
- Born: Bristol, England
- Died: April 18, 1724; Off Nova Scotia
- Piratical career
- Type: Pirate
- Allegiance: None
- Years active: April 19, 1721 - April 1722 August 29, 1723 - April 18, 1724
- Rank: Captain
- Base of operations: Atlantic Ocean, along east coast of North America, and Caribbean Sea
- Commands: Revenge

John Phillips (died April 18, 1724) was an English pirate captain. He started his piratical career in 1721 under Thomas Anstis, and stole his own pirate vessel in 1723. He died in a surprise attack by his own prisoners. He is noted for the articles of his ship, the Revenge, one of only a few complete sets of pirate articles to survive from the so-called Golden Age of Piracy.

== Early career ==
Phillips was a ship's carpenter by trade. While voyaging from England to Newfoundland, his ship was captured on April 19, 1721, by Thomas Anstis's pirates. Phillips was forced to join the pirates, as skilled artisans often were. Phillips "was soon reconciled to the life of a Pirate," and served Anstis as carpenter for a year.

In April, 1722, Anstis sent Phillips and some other men ashore on Tobago to careen a captured frigate. A British warship soon arrived, forcing Anstis to flee and abandon Phillips and his comrades. Phillips avoided capture by hiding in the woods, and later returned to Bristol in England with other abandoned shipmates, where they gave up piracy for a time.

== Captaincy ==
Some of Phillips' pirate comrades were arrested and imprisoned shortly after their arrival in Bristol, prompting Phillips to take ship again for Newfoundland. There, he conspired to steal a ship and return to piracy. On August 29, 1723, with only four companions, Phillips seized a schooner belonging to William Minott from Petty Harbour, renamed her Revenge, and embarked on a new piratical voyage. Phillips' crewmen were John Nutt (sailing master), James Sparks (gunner), Thomas Fern (carpenter), and William White (tailor and private crewman). They agreed promptly to a set of articles. Significantly, Phillips' articles forbade rape under penalty of death; Anstis's crew had committed a notorious gang rape and murder while Phillips was serving with them.

Phillips set sail for the West Indies, capturing several fishing vessels on the way. Aboard one of these prizes was John Rose Archer, reputed to be a former crewman of Blackbeard; Archer joined Phillips and was elected quartermaster. On September 5, Phillips captured John Fillmore, great-grandfather of later U.S. president Millard Fillmore, aboard the sloop Dolphin, and forced him into service at White's suggestion. This increased the Revenge's total crew to 11. Proceeding to the Caribbean, Phillips and his men hunted for merchantmen near Barbados. They made no captures for three months, and ran severely short of food and supplies, before finally taking some French and English vessels. They went on to Tobago, where Phillips searched for some of his abandoned comrades from Anstis's crew, but found only one survivor, a black man named Pedro. Phillips careened the Revenge and took Pedro aboard.

The Revenge captured another vessel after leaving Tobago, and the carpenter Thomas Fern, in charge of the prize crew, attempted to escape with the stolen vessel. The Revenge overtook Fern and captured him, killing one of the prize crew and wounding another. Fern and one of his crewmates tried and failed to escape again later that winter, and Phillips killed them both. Charles Johnson describes this killing as being "pursuant to their Articles," but as Phillips' Article II specifies marooning rather than outright execution as the punishment for running away, this may be an error or may reflect the articles being amended at some point.

Somewhere to the north of Tobago, in March 1723, Phillips captured two more ships, killing a ship's master named Robert Mortimer when the latter attacked the pirates in an attempt to regain his vessel. The pirates continued northward arriving at Cape Sable, Nova Scotia, on April 1, 1723. Here Phillips met great success as he raided New England fishing vessels working the fishing banks between Cape Sable and Sable Island. His men robbed some 13 vessels over the course of a few days. One vessel they spared was a schooner which belonged to William Minott, the original owner of Revenge as Phillips declared "We have done him enough injury."

== Death ==
The last of these captures near Nova Scotia was a sloop commanded by Andrew Harradine. This latter conspired with some other prisoners who had previously been forced to join the crew, planning to mutiny and kill Captain Phillips. John Fillmore and his allies attacked the Revenge's leaders on April 18, killing Phillips as well as his sailing master, boatswain, and gunner. Archer was temporarily spared, but died on the gallows at Boston with three of the other pirates on June 2, 1724. The pirates gave widely reprinted speeches before their executions. Archer blamed drinking but also blamed brutal merchant captains who drove oppressed sailors to seek piracy as a tempting way to escape.

Phillips had survived less than eight months as a pirate captain, but in this short period he had captured 34 ships.

== Significance ==
Phillips was essentially a small-time criminal as compared to pirates like Roberts; he commanded only a small schooner, and at the time of his death he had just 11 men under his command, as compared to the 276 men captured aboard Roberts' vessels, or the four-ship flotilla with which Blackbeard blockaded Charleston. Faced with a shortage of manpower, Phillips and his men frequently threatened prisoners to try to induce them to sign their articles, refused to honor promises of release to prisoners like Fillmore, and savagely punished anyone trying to leave the ship.

However Phillips is important to scholars of piracy because his articles have survived, through reprinting in Charles Johnson's General History of the Pyrates. Only a handful of other complete or near-complete sets of articles appear in the secondary literature (those of Roberts, Gow and a single code shared by Low and Lowther), plus a few more, under a dozen in total. These few articles underpin much of scholarly insight into life aboard pirate vessels. The written account by John Fillmore of life aboard Phillips' schooner Revenge is one of the best surviving primary sources by an eyewitness to piracy during the Golden Age.

Phillips is also significant as an example of the short-lived but destructive bands of pirates who branched out from much larger pirate crews led by Anstis and Blackbeard. He ended a line of pirate captains who had successively been captured by other pirates, joined their captors, and ascended to command. Phillips' captor and mentor, Anstis, had himself been captured by Bartholomew Roberts, who was in turn a former captive of Howell Davis, who had turned to piracy after falling into Edward England's hands. This line sprang originally from the pirate den on Nassau, Bahamas, which had served as a base for Davis, England, and many other robber captains. His quartermaster Archer had originally served with Blackbeard, continuing the influence of Blackbeard's formidable crew long after it was defeated in battle in 1718.

=== Phillips' Jolly Roger ===
Jolly Roger reportedly used by Phillips

Fillmore does not mention Phillips using a Jolly Roger during the capture of the Dolphin. However, Phillips reportedly used a red flag during his capture of a Martinique vessel toward the end of 1723; at the sight of the flag and Phillips' threat to show no quarter, the larger and more heavily armed crew of the Martinique vessel surrendered without firing a shot.

Phillips' flag was turned over to Massachusetts authorities when his victorious prisoners sailed the Revenge into Annisquam. The Boston News-Letter described the flag as follows: "their own dark flag, in the middle of which an anatomy, and at one side of it a dart in the heart, with drops of blood proceeding from it; and on the other side an hour-glass."

== See also ==
- List of kidnappings

== Bibliography ==
- Flemming, Gregory. At the Point of a Cutlass: The Pirate Capture, Bold Escape, and Lonely Exile of Philip Ashton. ForeEdge (2014) ISBN 978-1611685152
- Charles Johnson (1724). A General History of the Pyrates.
- Dan Conlin. (2009). Pirates of the Atlantic: Robbery, murder and mayhem off the Canadian East Coast Halifax: Formac Publishing. ISBN 978-0-88780-741-1
- John R. Stephens (2006). Captured by Pirates: 22 Firsthand Accounts of Murder and Mayhem on the High Seas. ISBN 0-7607-8537-6.
