= Thomas Sutton (pirate) =

Scottish pirate

Thomas Sutton (c. 1699-1722) was a pirate from Berwick, Scotland, active off the coast of the African continent. He was best known for sailing alongside Bartholomew Roberts.

== History ==
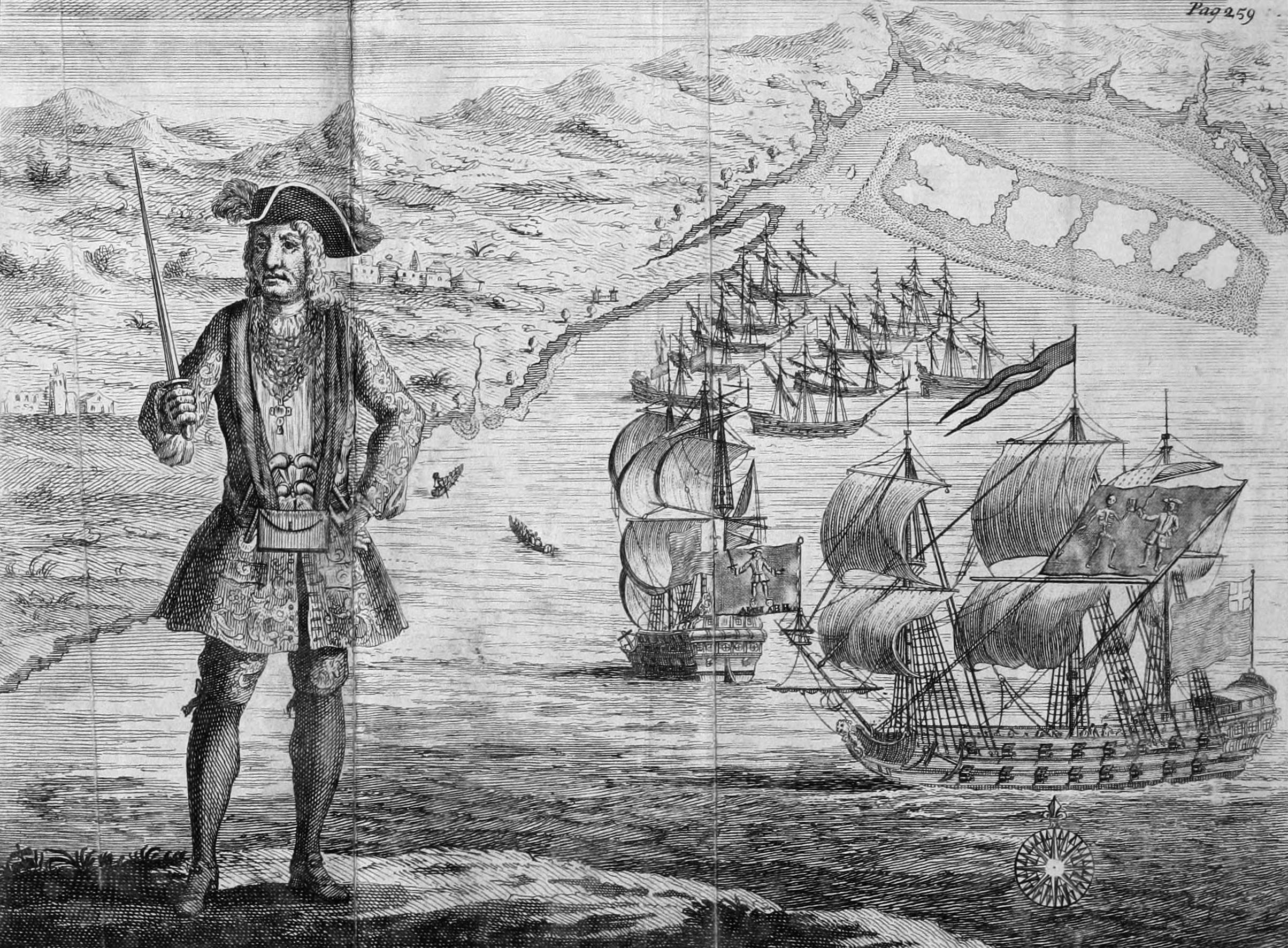
An illustration of Bartholomew Roberts off the coast of Ouidah with two captured ships, Royal Fortune and Ranger, in 1721.

Thomas Sutton had been a gunner aboard Howell Davis' 32-gun Royal Rover as they cruised off the Gold Coast taking a number of prizes in 1719. Davis tried tricking the governor of Principe into boarding his ship; the governor saw through his deception, turned the tables, and had his soldiers ambush and kill Davis as he came ashore. The Rover's crew elected former prisoner Bartholomew Roberts as their new captain. Sutton continued sailing with Roberts, even as Thomas Anstis and Walter Kennedy abandoned Roberts by stealing the prize ships he had given them to command.

Roberts took a large number of prize ships and amassed a huge crew during his cruises. In 1721 near the coast of Guinea two French ships pursued Roberts but were themselves captured. Roberts renamed one Little Ranger and gave command of it to James Skyrme to use as a storeship; the other, Comte de Toulouse, he renamed Ranger and selected Thomas Sutton as captain.

The fleet captured a number of other vessels near Sierra Leone and Liberia, stopping in December 1721 to careen on Annobón. There Roberts gave command of the Ranger to James Skyrme. In February 1722 Roberts's Royal Fortune and its two escorts were intercepted by the warship HMS Swallow under Captain Chaloner Ogle. The ensuing battle was fierce; Skyrme was maimed and Roberts was killed, and all three ships were captured.

Imprisoned, Sutton was chained in the hold next to a man who prayed constantly. When the man said he hoped to achieve Heaven, Sutton responded:

"Heaven, you Fool, did you ever hear of any Pyrates going thither? Give me Hell, it's a merrier Place; I'll give Roberts a Salute of 13 Guns at Entrance."

Ogle took the prisoners to Cape Coast Castle in Ghana, where most were tried and convicted. Some were sentenced to labor in the mines or simply hanged. Sutton had been among a group of Roberts' officers known as the "House of Lords" - sailors who had stayed with Roberts since his early days - and had been called "Lord Sutton". In the end he was among 18 pirates hung "in chains", gibbeted:

"YOU Dav. Simpson, William Magnes, R. Hardy, Tho. Sutton, Christopher Moody, and Val. Ashplant.
Ye, and each of you, are adjudged and sentenced, to be carried back to the Place from whence ye came, from thence to the Place of Execution, without the Gates of this Castle, and there within the Flood-Marks, to be hanged by the Neck till ye are dead.
After this, ye, and each of you shall be taken down, and your Bodies hanged in Chains."

== See also ==
- Battle of Cape Lopez, the overall name for Ogle's actions against Roberts' pirate flotilla.
