= James Skyrme =

Welsh pirate

- Died: March 1722
- Cause of death: Hanged
- Other names: Skyrm
- Occupation: Pirate
- Known for: Captaining two of Bartholomew Roberts’ prize ships
- Piratical career
- Commands: Little Ranger
- Battles/wars: Battle of Cape Lopez

James Skyrme (fl. 1720 - died March 1722, last name occasionally Skyrm) was a Welsh pirate best known for Captaining two of Bartholomew Roberts’ prize ships.

== History ==
Interpretation of Skyrme's consort-flag based on the Chaloner Ogle-description

In the summer of 1720, James Skyrme sailed from Bristol as first mate of Greyhound. That October off St. Lucia, Bartholomew Roberts took over a dozen vessels, Greyhound included. Captured, Skyrme signed their Articles and joined Roberts’ crew while Roberts burned Greyhound.

Two French ships attacked Roberts in April 1721, but were themselves captured by the pirates. Renaming the vessels, Roberts gave command of Ranger to Thomas Sutton and gave Skyrme Little Ranger, which Roberts used as a storeship. Sailing alongside Roberts, they captured a number of other ships and their crews. Later that year Roberts put into Cape Lopez to careen, replacing Sutton with Skyrme as captain of Ranger.

In February 1722, Captain Chaloner Ogle of HMS Swallow baited Roberts into attacking his 50-gun warship. Mistaking it for a fleeing merchantman, Roberts sent Skyrme in Ranger to capture it. Once Ranger was alone, Ogle sprung his trap and opened fire on the pirates. After a short battle Ranger was heavily damaged, a number of pirates had been killed, and Skyrme's leg was sheared off by cannon fire. Skyrme tried to continue the fight but Ranger eventually struck its colors and surrendered. Desperate pirates tried to blow up Ranger by firing a pistol into a barrel of gunpowder but failed and were badly burned. Five days after defeating Skyrme, Ogle returned to Cape Lopez and wiped out the rest of Roberts' fleet; Roberts died early in the battle. Swallow took the survivors and a badly wounded Skyrme to Cape Coast Castle where they were tried and most of them, Skyrme included, were hanged that March.

Ranger itself survived the battle against Ogle's Swallow, though it did not last much longer. Returned across the Atlantic as a prize ship, it sank off Port Royal when a hurricane devastated the town in August 1722.

== See also ==
- Battle of Cape Lopez, the name for Ogle's overall fight against Roberts, Skyrme, and Sutton.
