= Brigstock Weaver =

English pirate

- Born: c. 1686
- Died: 1767 (aged 80–81)
- Other name: Bridstock
- Citizenship: English
- Known for: Association with fellow pirates Thomas Anstis and Bartholomew Roberts
- Criminal charge: Piracy
- Criminal status: Pardoned
- Piratical career
- Type: Pirate
- Years active: 1720-1725
- Base of operations: Caribbean
- Commands: Good Fortune

Brigstock Weaver (born c. 1686 – died 1767) (fl. 1720–1725, first name occasionally Bridstock) was an English pirate active in the Caribbean. He is best known for his association with fellow pirates Thomas Anstis and Bartholomew Roberts.

== History ==
Weaver had been first mate of the Mary and Martha when they were captured near Saint Kitts in 1720 by Bartholomew Roberts and Montigny la Palisse, who burned the ship and forced the crew to sign their Articles. Roberts took several more vessels, keeping the best of them for himself and placing Thomas Anstis in command of his previous ship Good Fortune. Weaver joined Anstis as first mate.

In April 1721 Anstis broke off from Roberts and took the Good Fortune with him. Soon after Anstis captured the Morning Star, fitting it out as his own ship (Note: This directly contradicts some accounts of Anstis's career, which have him keeping Good Fortune for himself and granting Morning Star to his gunner John Fenn.) and forcing Weaver to command the Good Fortune. Weaver continued piracy on his own throughout 1722, looting over fifty ships from the Caribbean to Newfoundland.

He met Anstis again while careening their vessels in 1723 when they were caught while ashore by a pirate-hunting warship. After the Morning Star ran ashore and was wrecked they scattered, while Fenn took command of the Good Fortune from Weaver and used it to escape. Many of the pirates were captured but Weaver and a few others fled into the woods; soldiers found Anstis dead, murdered by his own disgruntled crew.

Weaver made his way back to Bristol, England aboard a logwood hauler. He was “in a very ragged condition” and petitioned for help from an old acquaintance, who gave him a room and a little money. He bought new clothes and walked freely around town until by chance he met the captain of a ship he'd helped raid while serving under Anstis. The captain, Joseph Smith, offered to let Weaver go if he could replace the liquor he'd stolen off the captured ship (about 2000 pints of cider.) Weaver failed to do so; he was jailed, tried in London for piracy in May 1725, and sentenced to hang.

William Ingram and other crew who'd served with Anstis willingly were executed. Weaver's own testimony minimized his role in piracy and emphasized the fact that he had been forced aboard. Some crewmen such as the ship's doctor William Parker (who had also been captured and forced aboard) confirmed his story and in July 1725 the Admiralty Court pardoned Weaver. (Note: Some later sources (Gosse, et al.) claim that Weaver was executed after his trial, but actual trial records make clear that Weaver was reprieved and eventually pardoned.)

== See also ==
- John Gow, another (unrelated) pirate tried at the same time as Weaver.
