= Anubis (disambiguation) =

Anubis is an ancient Egyptian god.

Anubis may also refer to:

== Astronomy ==
- 1912 Anubis, a small asteroid
- Anubis (crater), a crater on the south pole of Ganymede, a moon of Jupiter

== Entertainment ==
- Anubis (novel), a 2002 novel by Ibrahim Kuni
- The Anubis Tapestry, a 2006 novel by Bruce Zick
- The Anubis Gates, a 1983 time travel fantasy novel by Tim Powers
- Anubis (Stargate), powerful Goa'uld in Stargate SG-1
- BeastMaster (TV series) character
- Anubis Rex, a seventh episode of Pac-Man World and its remake
  - Anubis, a second boss of Pac-Man World and its remake
- Anubis, a Pal in the video game Palworld
- Anubis: Zone of the Enders, the Japanese name of PlayStation 2 game Zone of the Enders: The 2nd Runner
- Anubis, the name of an orbital frame in the game Zone of the Enders
- Anubis Cruger, commander in the Space Patrol Delta in Power Rangers: SPD
- Anubis (Black Cat), a character from the anime Black Cat
- Anubis (Ronin Warriors), a character from the anime Ronin Warriors
- Anubis (comics), a take on the Egyptian deity seen in Marvel Comics
- SS Anubis, an area of gameplay in the Nintendo 64 game Jet Force Gemini
- Anubis II, a 2005 video game starring the ancient Egyptian god
- Anubis, a cheap fighter ship in the space exploration game Freelancer
- Anubis, a space colony in the novel 3001: The Final Odyssey
- House of Anubis, the English (international) remake of the Dutch Nickelodeon show Het Huis Anubis
- Das Haus Anubis, German remake of House of Anubis
- Anubis, a song by Septic Flesh from their 2008 album Communion
- Anubis (2016 film), a Burmese horror film
- Sonia Anubis, guitarist of Cobra Spell

== Species ==
- Anubis (beetle), a genus of beetles
- Olive baboon or Anubis baboon, a baboon from the Old World monkey family
- Phiomicetus anubis, a fossil discovered in 2021

== Technology ==
- Anubis (cipher), a block cipher by Vincent Rijmen and P. S. L. M. Barreto as an entrant in the NESSIE project
- GNU Anubis, an outgoing mail processor
- Anubis (software), a software program to make web scraping harder

== Other uses ==
- "Anubis", a disc golf midrange disc by Infinite Discs
