= Lopes Gonçalves =

Portuguese explorer and first European to sail south of the equator

- Occupation: Sailor
- Known for: First European sailor crossing Earth's equator

Lopes Gonçalves or Lopo Gonçalves was a Portuguese explorer of the African coast. He was the first European sailor to cross the equator, the first to reach the point where the coast turns south and the first to reach Gabon. In 1473 or 1474 he and Rui de Sequeira, pushing Portuguese exploration east along the Nigerian coast, reached the point where the coast begins to run south. He followed it south, crossed the equator, passed Cape Lopez in Gabon, which is named after him, and reached Cape St. Catherine, which is about 2 degrees south.
