= Montigny la Palisse =

- Occupation: Pirate
- Years active: 1720–1721
- Known for: His association with Bartholomew Roberts
- Piratical career
- Commands: Sea King

Montigny La Palisse (fl. 1720–1721) was a French pirate best known for his association with Bartholomew Roberts.

== History ==
There is little information on La Palisse’s activities before he joined Roberts in February 1720. Roberts had been active across the Caribbean. Near Barbados on February 19, 1720, Roberts in the Fortune spotted a sloop, hoisted his black flag, and gave chase. The sloop responded with a black flag of its own: it was the 6-gun, 63-man Sea King under Saint-Malo’s Montigny La Palisse, and so Fortune and Sea King sailed in concert.

Authorities in Barbados equipped two ships to attack Roberts. La Palisse fled in the Sea King after its rigging was damaged, leaving Roberts to face the warships alone. Roberts escaped but Fortune was heavily damaged, and narrowly avoided capture again when two additional ships from Martinique pursued him. That July Roberts took several French prize ships, transferring to the largest and renaming it Good Fortune. Sailing near Newfoundland, La Palisse and Sea King rejoined Roberts, apologizing for their retreat, and together they headed back to the Caribbean.

Roberts had taken a number of ships, renaming them Good Fortune and Royal Fortune in succession. He was off the coast of South Carolina in August, anchored outside Charles Town. La Palisse had become separated from Roberts by bad weather in the meantime, but a month later he rejoined Roberts to plunder Basseterre. In September and October the pair took dozens of vessels in quick order. By January 1721 La Palisse (in a renamed prize ship), Thomas Anstis in the Good Fortune, and Roberts in the Royal Fortune (La Palisse’s former Sea King) were sailing together.

In April 1721 Anstis took Good Fortune and slipped away in the night; his first mate was Brigstock Weaver, who had been captured by Roberts and La Palisse and forced into joining the pirates. Roberts meanwhile stopped at the Cape Verde Islands to repair his ships. He chased two merchant vessels but La Palisse refused to engage when confronted by their two warship escorts. Shortly afterwards La Palisse severed his ties with Roberts; there are few records of his activities afterwards.

== See also ==
- Walter Kennedy, another of Roberts' captains who, like La Palisse and Anstis, took his prize ship and abandoned Roberts.
