= The Bleeding of the Stone =

2013 novel by Ibrahim Al-Kuni

- Author: Ibrahim Al-Kuni
- Language: Arabic
- Genre: Fiction
- Publisher: Egyptian-Lebanese publishing house
- Publication date: January 2013
- Publication place: Libya
- ISBN: 9781566564175

The Bleeding of the Stone (Arabic: نزيف الحجر) is a novel by the Libyan author Ibrahim Al-Kuni. It was originally published in 1990 and republished in January 2013 by the Egyptian-Lebanese Publishing House.

== Themes ==
The novel portrays a combination of ecological issues, traditional desert life, and the power of the human spirit. It also addresses the idea of the constant struggle between good and evil.

It discusses these themes using ideas from physiology, religion, and emotions.

== Plot ==
The novel tells the story of Asouf, a lone bedouin who loves and respects the desert and identifies with its creatures. Asouf knows exactly where he can find moufflon, wild sheep known for their meat, who survive in the remote mountainous desert of southern Libya. But Asouf and the moufflon are both threatened by hunters who have already slaughtered the once numerous desert gazelles.

== Reception ==
The Guardian listed it as one of the best books on Libya. Kirkus Reviews described it as "a winning combination of fable, political statement, and lyrical lament for the past".
