= Battle of Cape Lopez =

1722 British naval battle with pirates off Gabon

- Part of the Golden Age of Piracy
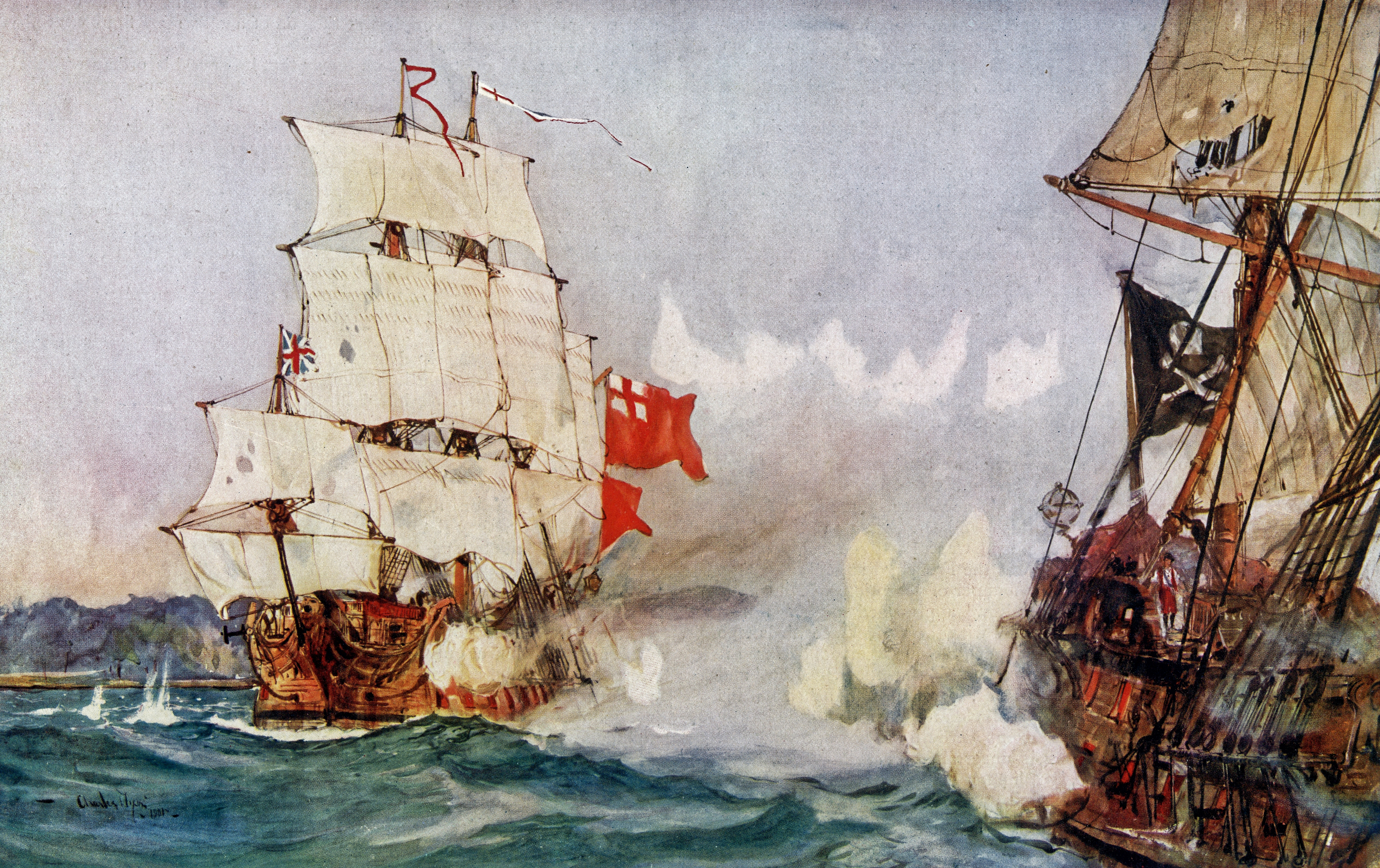
- Illustration of the battle by Charles Dixon
Date	10 February 1722
Location	Off Cape Lopez, Atlantic Ocean
Result	British victory

Belligerents
Great Britain	Pirates

Commanders and leaders
Chaloner Ogle	Bartholomew Roberts †

Strength
1 ship of the line	1 frigate 1 brig

Casualties and losses
None	3 killed 272 captured 1 frigate captured

The Battle of Cape Lopez was fought in on 10 February 1722 during the Golden Age of Piracy. HMS Swallow, a British ship of the line under Captain Chaloner Ogle, defeated the pirate ship of Bartholomew Roberts off the coast of Gabon, West Africa.

== Background ==
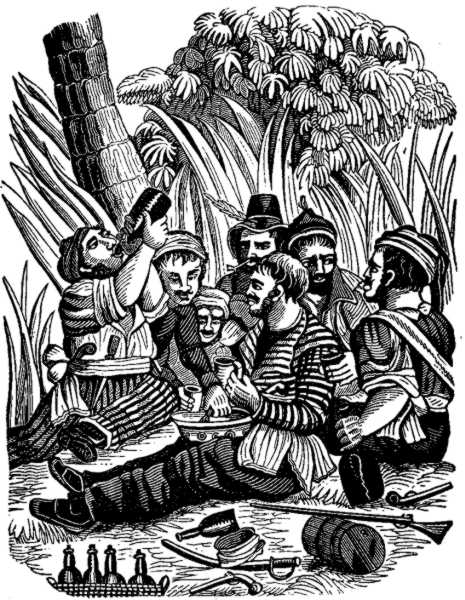
Robert's crew drinking on land prior to the battle

The Welshman Bartholomew Roberts was the most successful pirate of the Golden Age of Piracy; he captured well over 400 vessels ranging from small fishing boats to large frigates. In April 1721, Roberts was off the coast of Martinique when he came across a 52-gun French frigate and captured her. Aboard the vessel was the governor of Martinique Florimond Hurault de Montigny, who was allegedly hanged by Roberts from the yardarm of his ship. This act proved to be his downfall as it was apparently the final straw. In retaliation for Roberts' repeated attacks on merchantmen and his murder of de Montigny, the French Navy and Royal Navy dispatched several warships to hunt him down. Roberts and his men subsequently captured two French warships off the mouth of the Senegal River, the 16-gun sloop Comte de Toulouse and a 10-gun brig. Comte de Toulouse was renamed the Ranger and the brig Little Ranger. Roberts proceeded to sail southeast for modern-day Gabon.

En route, Roberts sighted and captured the Royal African Company (RAC) frigate Onslow off the Pepper Coast, renaming her Royal Fortune. The frigate mounted over 40 guns and her crew consisted of about 250 white and Black men. Roberts' luck was soon to run out though, as two British warships began patrolling off the West African coast at about the same time Roberts anchored in Cape Lopez for careening. The two warships were the 50-gun fourth-rates HMS Swallow and HMS Weymouth. Swallow, under Captain Chaloner Ogle, encountered Roberts. When Ogle sailed around the cape he sighted three pirate ships and the merchantman Neptune, which was illegally trading with the pirates. Ogle spotted a sandbar and quickly ordered his ship to turn out of the way, at the same time raising a false Portuguese flag. By this time the pirates had spotted Swallow so Roberts allowed Ranger's captain James Skyrme to attack what he thought was a fleeing merchant ship.

Sensing an opportunity, Ogle chose to let the pirate chase him for several hours until they were far away from the cape and land was no longer in sight. Ogle then turned about, raised the White Ensign and engaged Skyrme, who still did not realize the Swallow was a British warship. After a relatively short action in which 10 pirates were killed, Ranger was captured. Ogle then patiently sailed back to Cape Lopez where he arrived five days later on 10 February 1722.

== Battle ==
According to legend, at this time Roberts was eating a breakfast meal of salmagundi with the captain of Neptune aboard Royal Fortune when one of his crew shouted that Ranger was returning from her chase with the merchant ship. A few moments later they discovered the incoming vessel was not their sloop but Swallow. One pirate, who had deserted from Weymouth at Madeira, recognized Swallow's identity and informed Roberts. Without fear Roberts boarded Royal Fortune and as he did before all of his battles dressed in his finest clothing, which included a red damask waistcoat and a red feather in his hat, and began organizing his escape. Most of Little Ranger's crew was ordered to join the crew of the Royal Fortune so as to keep as many pirates as possible aboard the largest pirate ship for defense. Little Ranger which was hauled on her side being cleaned at the time, was abandoned. When the pirates left, Neptune's crew went aboard the Little Ranger and looted gold and other valuables, and sailed off for Príncipe.

Roberts' plan called for him to sail directly towards Swallow in order to quickly pass her and then escape. By doing this Swallow would have to turn about to engage or chase Royal Fortune which would give Roberts valuable time to flee. The plan however had one flaw, by sailing right past the British warship Royal Fortune would be exposed to broadsides from Swallow. Roberts set out for his escape and issued the command for Little Ranger and Neptune to leave. The following action ended badly for the pirates. When Royal Fortune was off Swallow's beam, the latter fired a broadside which raked the pirate ship. The pirates began opening fire in return before a second broadside from Swallow raked Royal Fortune's deck. The pirate ship got clear and ran ahead of the wind, leaving Swallow behind.

The action took place during a fierce tropical storm, and just as Royal Fortune seemed to have escaped she reached the centre of the storm, and were suddenly becalmed for half an hour. This gave the unaffected Swallow time to catch up, and when she were in range, the warship's crew fired their swivel guns at Royal Fortune. Three men died, one of them Roberts. A musket ball no bigger than a penny hit him in the throat and severed his spinal column, killing him instantly. He slumped over a cannon, to initial observers that he was taking a rest but when the smoke had cleared away Roberts was dead and Ogle later allowed his crew to bury him at sea, which they did in all his finery, including a diamond studded six inch cross on a chain which he wore around his neck. The pirates, determined to avenge their captain, slowed down their vessel and turned around to continue the engagement. According to some accounts the action lasted for around three hours before cannon fire from the ship of the line dismasted the pirate frigate and allowed boarding. Royal Fortune's colors were struck by force and the remaining pirates were taken prisoner.

== Aftermath ==
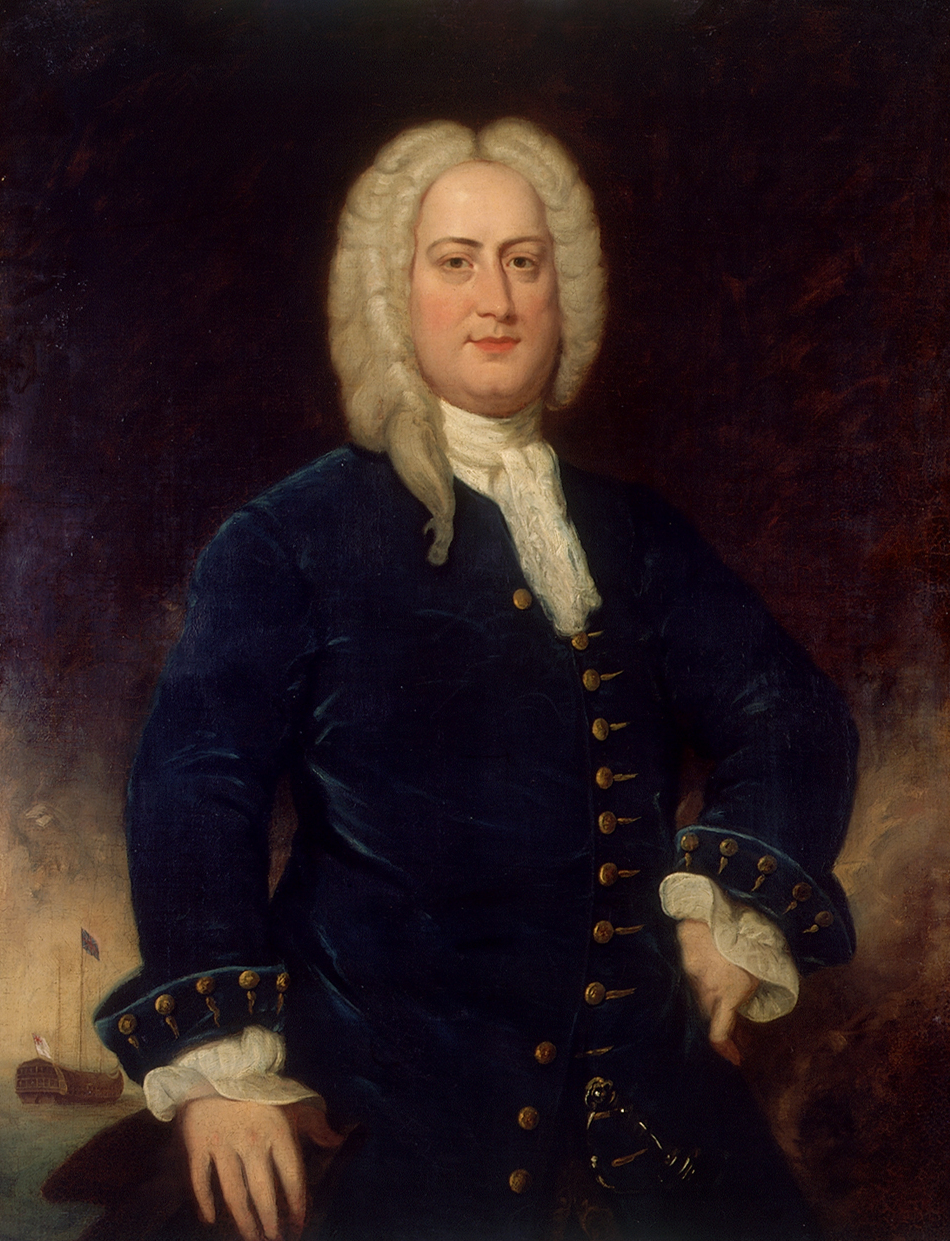
Portrait of Ogle made over two decades after the battle

Swallow suffered no casualties while 272 pirates were taken prisoner onboard Royal Fortune. Ogle intended to return to Cape Lopez and capture Little Ranger, which was also carrying a quantity of gold, but she and Neptune both escaped. Several captive prisoners were wounded and died on their way to the Cape Coast Castle, a RAC slave fort where the prisoners were all put on trial. 54 prisoners were executed by hanging, while the 65 Black prisoners were sold back into slavery. 17 prisoners were sent to be imprisoned at Marshalsea prison in London while 20 were sentenced to become indentured servants for the RAC.

The rest of the prisoners escaped punishment by convincing the authorities holding the trial that they had been forced to serve under Roberts. Ogle, who took several ounces of gold dust from Ranger and Royal Fortune, was made a Knight Companion of the Order of the Bath in April 1723, the only Royal Navy officer to be honoured specifically for his actions against pirates. The battle proved to a major turning point in the Golden Age of Piracy, which quickly came to an end following Roberts' death.
