= Attack on Príncipe (1719) =

Pirate sack of the Portuguese island off Africa

- Part of the Golden Age of Piracy
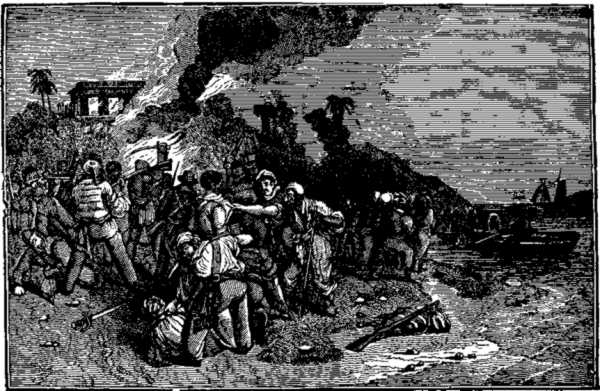
- Illustration of the death of Captain Howell Davis on Príncipe
Date	June 1719
Location	Príncipe, Portuguese Empire

Belligerents
Kingdom of Portugal	Pirates

Commanders and leaders
(Portugal) Carneiro de Sousa	Howell Davis †; Bartholomew Roberts; Walter Kennedy

The Attack on Príncipe, or the Sack of Príncipe, was carried out by pirates in June 1719, led by Captain Howell Davis against the Portuguese island of Príncipe.
