= Gold Dust =

Gold Dust or Gold dust may refer to:

== Animal ==
- Gold Dust (elephant) (1873–1898), male Asian elephant that was kept in the National Zoo in the late 19th century
- Gold dust day gecko, a subspecies of geckos which lives in northern Madagascar and on the Comoros
- Gold dust disease, also known as velvet disease, a fish disease caused by the dinoflagellate parasites

== Plant ==
- Aurinia saxatilis, an ornamental plant native to Asia and Europe
- Aucuba japonica, the gold dust plant, an ornamental shrub native to China, Korea, and Japan
- Chrysothrix candelaris, the gold dust lichen, a yellow fungus that commonly grows on tree bark
- Gold Dust, a cultivar of the rosemary plant

== Music ==
=== Record labels and production companies ===
- Gold Dust Media, a record label which joined Studio !K7 in 2008
- Gold Dust Records, a record label formed by Goldie Lookin Chain
- Goldust Productions, a music production company

=== Albums ===
- Gold Dust (Tori Amos album), a 2012 studio album by Tori Amos
- Gold Dust (Sandy Denny album), a 1998 live album by Sandy Denny
- Gold Dust, a 2012 album by Jonathan Jeremiah with The Metropole Orkest

=== Songs ===
- "Gold Dust" (DJ Fresh song), 2008/2010
- "Gold Dust" (Galantis Song), 2016
- "Gold Dust", a 2013 song by John Newman from Tribute
- "Gold Dust", a 2022 song by NCT 127 from 2 Baddies
- "Gold Dust", a 2010 song by Sandi Thom from Merchants and Thieves
- "Golddust", a 2016 song by Danny Brown from Atrocity Exhibition

== People ==
- Goldust (Dustin Runnels, born 1969), American wrestler also known as Dustin Rhodes
- Gold Dust Trio, a group of promoters who controlled the world of professional wrestling during the 1920s
- Gold Dust Twins, Goldie and Dustie, the mascots of Fairbank's Gold Dust washing powder

== Other ==
- Gold Dust (novel), a 1990 novel by Ibrahim Al-Koni
- Gold Dust washing powder, an 1889–1930s American cleaning product
- Golddust, Tennessee, U.S.
- Gold dust, fine particles of gold
