= Ibrahim al-Koni =

Libyan writer

Ibrāhīm Kūnī
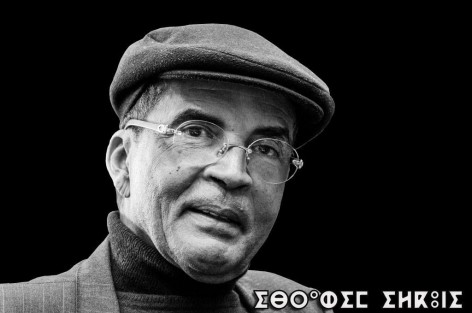
- Born: 1948
- Occupation: Novelist
- Language: Arabic

Ibrāhīm al-Kōnī (sometimes translated as Ibrāhīm Kūnī) (Arabic: ابراهيم الكوني) is a Libyan writer and is considered to be one of the most prolific Arab novelists.

== Biography ==
Born in 1948 in the Fezzan Region, Ghadamis City, Ibrahim al-Koni was brought up in the traditions of the Tuareg, people, who are popularly known as "the veiled men" or "the blue men." Mythological elements, spiritual quests and existential questions mingle in the writings of al-Koni, who has been "hailed as a magical realist, a Sufi fabulist, and a poetic novelist."

He spent his childhood in the desert and learned to read and write Arabic when he was twelve. Al-Koni studied literature and journalism at the Maxim Gorky Literature Institute in Moscow and worked as a journalist in Moscow and Warsaw. He moved to Switzerland in 1993 and was living there as of 2011.

== Works ==
By 2007, Kuni had published more than 80 books and received numerous awards. His books have been translated from their original Arabic into 35 languages. He won the Mohamed Zafzaf Prize for the Arab Novel in 2005, and in 2008 he won the Sheikh Zayed Award for Literature. In 2015, Kuni was shortlisted for the Man Booker International Prize.

== Selected bibliography ==
- التبر [al-Tibr] (1990). Gold Dust, trans. Elliott Colla (American University in Cairo Press, 2008) ISBN 978-1-906697-02-0
- نزيف الحجر [Nazīf al-Ḥajar] (1990). The Bleeding of the Stone, trans. May Jayyusi and Christopher Tingley (Interlink Books, 2013)
- المجوس [al-Majūs] (1990–91). The Fetishists, trans. William M. Hutchins (University of Texas at Austin, 2019)
- New Waw / Oasis Trilogy:
  - واو الصغرى [Wāw al-Ṣughrā] (1997). New Waw: Saharan Oasis, trans. William M. Hutchins (University of Texas at Austin, 2014)
  - الدمية [al-Dumya] (1998). The Puppet, trans. William M. Hutchins (University of Texas at Austin, 2010)
  - الفزاعة [al-Fazāʿa] (1998). The Scarecrow, trans. William M. Hutchins (University of Texas at Austin, 2015)
- البحث عن المكان الضائع [al-Baḥth ʿan al-Makān al-Ḍāʾiʿ] (2003). The Seven Veils of Seth, trans. William M. Hutchins (Garnet Publishing, 2008) ISBN 978-1-85964-202-3
- أنوبيس [Anūbīs] (2012). Anubis: A Desert Novel, trans. William M. Hutchins (American University in Cairo Press, 2005)
- كلمة الليل في حق النهار [Kalimat al-Layl fī Ḥaqq al-Nahār] (2019). The Night Will Have Its Say, trans. Nancy Roberts (Hoopoe, 2022)

=== Compilations in English ===
- A Sleepless Eye: Aphorisms from the Sahara, ed. Hartmut Fähndrich, trans. Roger Allen (Syracuse University Press, 2014)

== Awards and honours ==
- 2005: Mohamed Zafzaf Prize for the Arab Novel
- 2006: Chevalier de l'Ordre des Arts et des Lettres
- 2008: Sheikh Zayed Book Award
- 2015: Shortlisted for Man Booker International Prize

== See also ==
- The Bleeding of the Stone
- Gold Dust (novel)
