= The Pirate (novel) =

Novel by Walter Scott

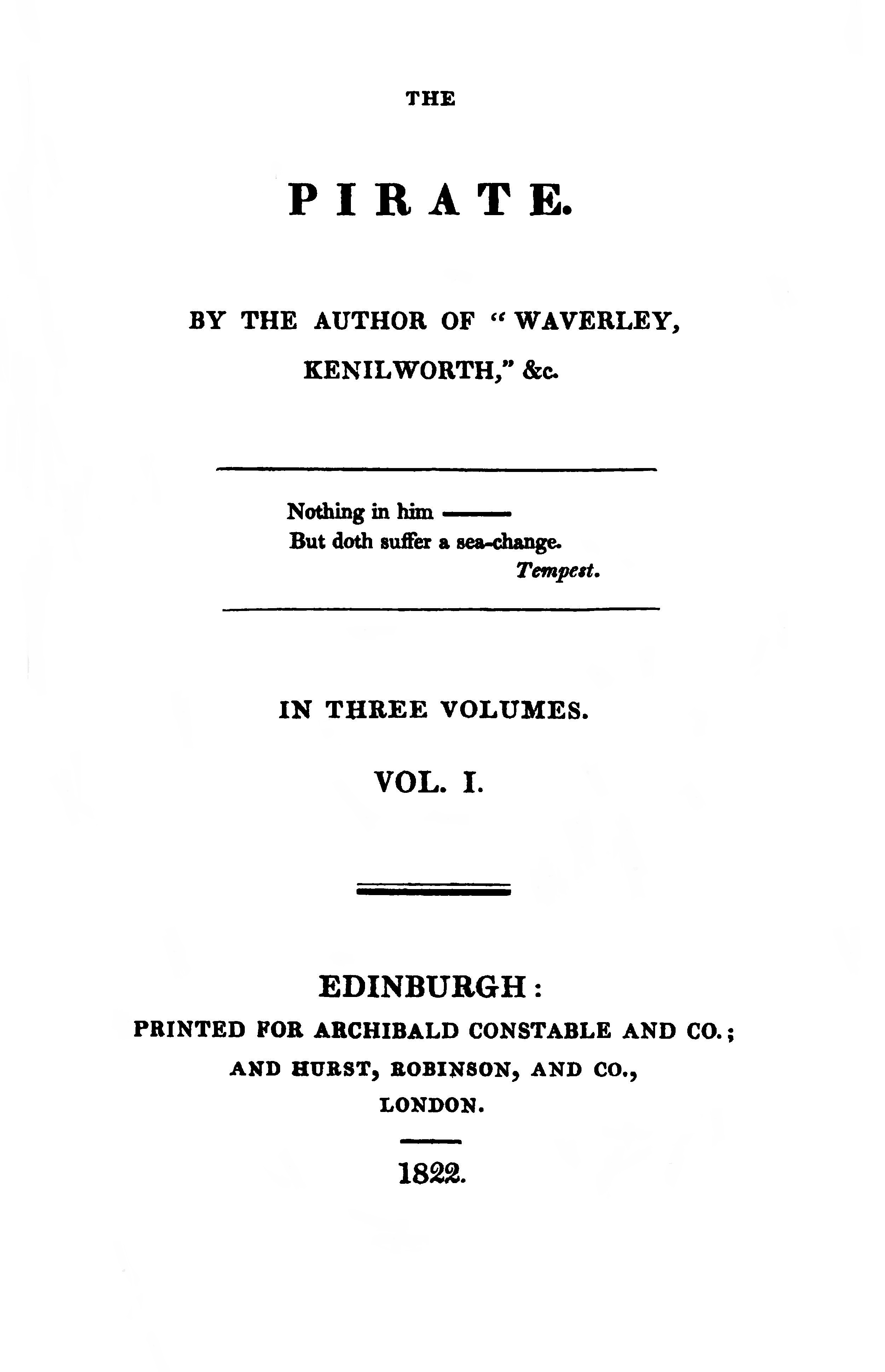
- First edition title page
- Author: Sir Walter Scott
- Language: English, Lowland Scots
- Series: Waverley Novels
- Genre: Historical novel
- Publisher: Archibald Constable, John Ballantyne (Edinburgh); Hurst, Robinson and Co. (London)
- Publication date: 1822
- Publication place: Scotland
- Media type: Print
- Pages: 391 (Edinburgh Edition, 2001)
- Preceded by: Kenilworth
- Followed by: The Fortunes of Nigel

"The Pirate" is also the title of novels by Harold Robbins and Frederick Marryat

The Pirate (published at the end of 1821 with the date 1822) is one of the Waverley novels by Sir Walter Scott, based roughly on the life of John Gow who features as Captain Cleveland. The setting is the southern tip of the main island of Shetland (which Scott visited in 1814), towards the end of the 17th century, with 1689 as the likely date of the main incidents.

== Composition and sources ==
On 21 August 1820 John Ballantyne offered Archibald Constable a new novel to follow Kenilworth (which was to be published in January the following year). No title or subject was specified at that stage, and it was not until April 1821 that Ballantyne noted that what he calls the 'Buccaneer' had been begun. The need for research on the northern isles, and other occupations, slowed Scott down, and the first volume was not completed until early August, but his pace then quickened and the work was finished in late October.

In 1814 Scott had taken a six-week cruise with the Northern Lighthouse Commissioners. He kept a diary (eventually published in his biography by J. G. Lockhart), and when he came to write The Pirate he was able to draw on it for many details about an otherwise unfamiliar part of Scotland. He accumulated a small collection of pirate literature, the most useful being History of the Lives and Actions of the most Famous Highwaymen, Murderers, Street-Robbers, &c. To which is added, A Genuine Account of the Voyages and Plunders of the most noted Pirates by Captain Charles Johnson (1742). This was supplemented by an account of the pirate John Gow supplied by Alexander Peterkin, Sheriff-Substitute of Orkney and Zetland, published in 1822, the year of the novel's appearance, as Notes on Orkney and Zetland. Scott was also acquainted with several books on the northern isles from the seventeenth century to his own time which discussed the agricultural questions that occupy Triptolemus Yellowley's attention in the novel.

== Editions ==
The Pirate was published in three volumes by Constable and Ballantyne in Edinburgh on 24 December 1821 and by Hurst, Robinson, and Co. in London two days later. As with all the Waverley novels before 1827 publication was anonymous. The print run was 12,000, though 2000 of these were a late afterthought which resulted in a bibliographical complication. The price was one and a half guineas (£1 11s 6d or £1.57½). It is unlikely that Scott was involved with the novel again until March and then August 1830 when he revised the text and provided an introduction and notes for the 'Magnum' edition in which it appeared as Volumes 24 and 25 in May and June 1831.

The standard modern edition, by Mark Weinstein and Alison Lumsden, was published in 2001 as Volume 12 of the Edinburgh Edition of the Waverley Novels: it is based on the first edition with emendations mainly from Scott's manuscript and proof corrections; the Magnum material is included in Volume 25b.

== Plot introduction ==
The arrival of the shipwrecked captain, Cleveland, spoils young Mordaunt's relationship with the Troil girls, and soon a bitter rivalry grows between the two men. Minna falls in love with Cleveland, not knowing his true profession. Brenda however is in love with Mordaunt. The pirates capture the Troils, but after an encounter with the frigate HMS Halcyon, they are freed. Brenda and Mordaunt are reunited, and Minna and Cleveland parted.

== Plot summary ==
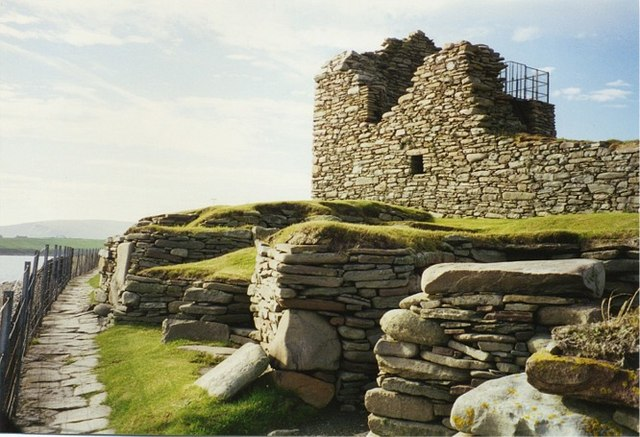
Old House of Sumburgh

Mr Mertoun and his son had arrived as strangers, and resided for several years in the remaining rooms of the old mansion of the Earls of Orkney, the father leading a very secluded life, while the son Mordaunt became a general favourite with the inhabitants, and especially with the udaller, Magnus Troil, and his daughters, Brenda and Minna. On his way home from a visit to them, he and the pedlar Snailsfoot sought shelter from a storm at a farmhouse, at Hafra, home of Triptolemus Yellowley agent of the Chamberlain of Orkney and Shetland, and his sister Barbara. The visitors were amused with the Yellowleys' penurious ways, and encountered Norna, a relative of Magnus Troil who was supposed to be in league with the fairies, and to possess supernatural powers. The next day a ship was wrecked on the rocky coast, and, at the risk of his life, Mordaunt rescued the captain, Cleveland, as he was cast on the beach clinging to a plank, while Norna prevented his sea-chest from being pillaged. Cleveland was in fact a pirate, but they did not know this. The captain promised his preserver a trip in a consort ship which he expected would arrive shortly, and went to seek the Udaller's help in recovering some of his other property that had been washed ashore. After the lapse of several weeks, however, during which the Troils had discontinued their friendly communications with him, Mordaunt heard that the stranger was still their guest, and that they were arranging an entertainment for Saint John's Eve, to which he had not been invited.

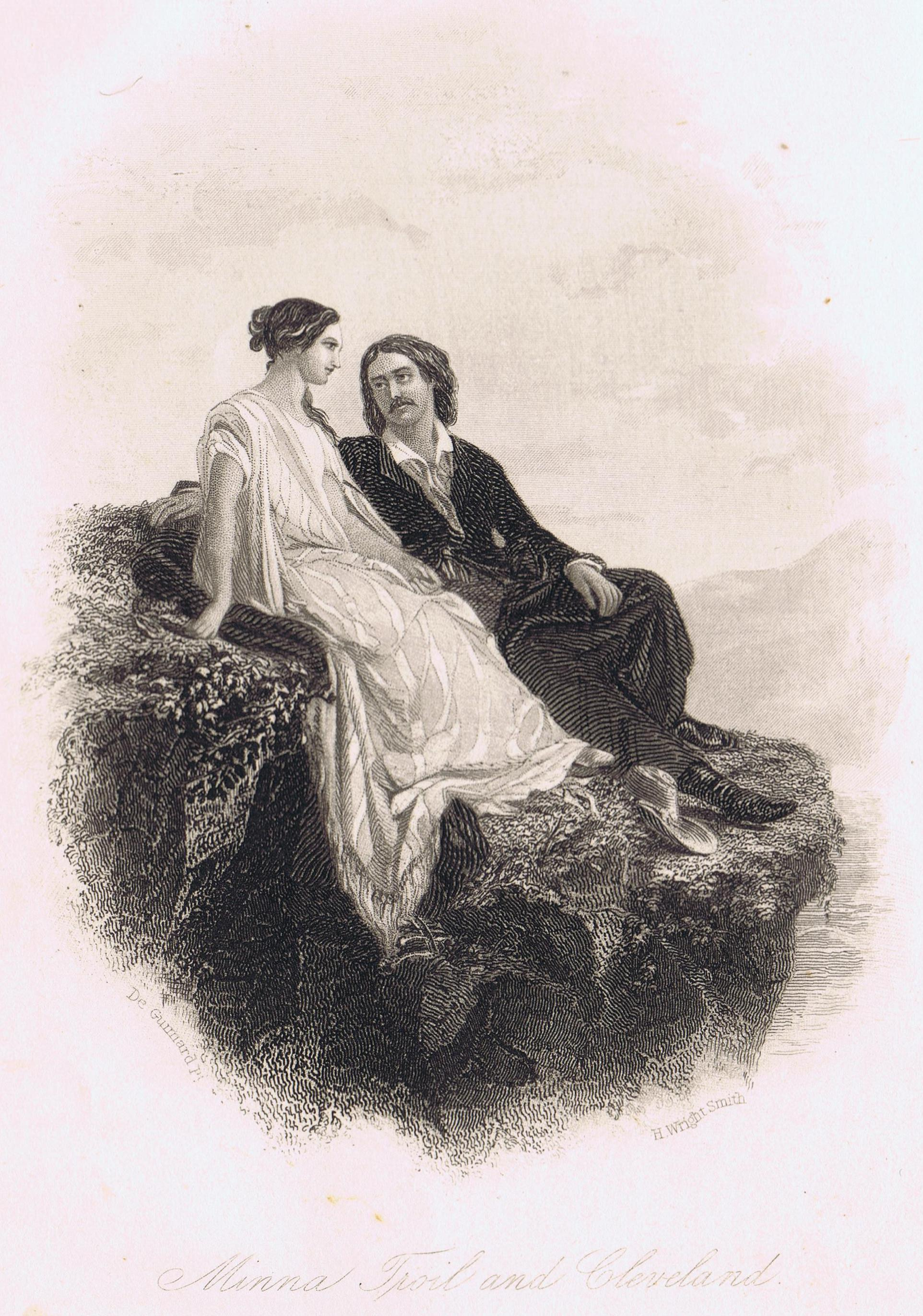
Minna Troil and Cleveland, illustration from 1879 edition

As he was brooding over this slight, Norna touched his shoulder, and, assuring him of her goodwill, advised him to join the party uninvited. Warned by his father against falling in love, and with some misgivings as to his reception, he called at Harfra on his way, and accompanied Yellowley and his sister to the feast. Minna and Brenda Troil replied to their discarded companion's greeting with cold civility, and he felt convinced that Captain Cleveland had supplanted him in their esteem. The bard, Claud Halcro, endeavoured to cheer him with his poetry and reminiscences of "glorious" John Dryden; and, in the course of the evening, Brenda, disguised as a masquer, told him they had heard that he had spoken unkindly of them, but that she did not believe he had done so. She also expressed her fear that the stranger had won Minna's love, and begged Mordaunt to discover all he could respecting him. During an attempt to capture a whale the following day, Cleveland saved Mordaunt from drowning, and, being thus released from his obligation to him, intimated that henceforth they were rivals. The same evening the pedlar brought tidings that a strange ship had arrived at Kirkwall, and Cleveland talked of a trip thither to ascertain whether it was the consort he had been so long expecting.

After the sisters had retired to bed, Norna appeared in their room, and narrated a startling tale of her early life, which led Minna to confess her attachment to the captain, and to elicit Brenda's partiality for Mordaunt. At a secret interview the next morning, Cleveland admitted to Minna that he was a pirate, upon which she declared that she could only still love him as a penitent, and not as the hero she had hitherto imagined him to be. He announced, in the presence of her father and sister, his intention of starting at once for Kirkwall; but at night he serenaded her, and then, after hearing a struggle and a groan, she saw the shadow of a figure disappearing with another on his shoulders. Overcome with grief and suspense, she was seized with a fit of melancholy, for the cure of which the udaller consulted Norna in her secluded dwelling; and, after a mystic ceremony, she predicted that the cause would cease when "crimson foot met crimson hand" in the Martyr's Aisle in Orkney land, whither she commanded her kinsman to proceed with his daughters. Mordaunt had been stabbed by the pirate, but had been carried away by Norna to Hoy, where she told him she was his mother, and, after curing his wound, conveyed him to Kirkwall. Here Cleveland had joined his companions, and, having been chosen captain of the consort ship, he obtained leave from the provost for her to take in stores at Stromness and quit the islands, on condition that he remained as a hostage for the crew's behaviour.

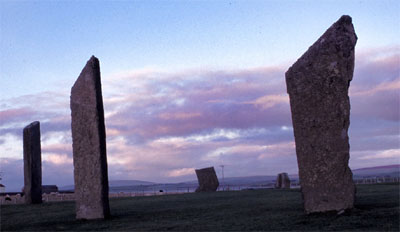
Stones of Stenness

On their way they captured the brig containing the Troils, but Minna and Brenda were sent safely ashore by John Bunce, Cleveland's lieutenant, and escorted by old Halcro to visit a relative. The lovers met in the cathedral of St Magnus, whence, with Norna's aid, Cleveland escaped to his ship, and the sisters were transferred to the residence of the bard's cousin, where their father joined them, and found Mordaunt in charge of a party of dependents for their protection. When all was ready for sailing, the captain resolved to see Minna once more, and having sent a note begging her to meet him at the Standing Stones of Stenness at daybreak, he made his way thither. Brenda persuaded Mordaunt to allow her sister to keep the appointment, and as the lovers were taking their last farewell, they and Brenda were seized by Bunce and his crew from the boat, and would have been carried off, had not Mordaunt hastened to the rescue, and made prisoners of the pirate and his lieutenant. Norna had warned Cleveland against delaying his departure, and his last hopes were quenched when, from the window of the room in which he and Bunce were confined, they witnessed the arrival of the Halcyon, whose captain she had communicated with, and the capture, after a desperate resistance, of their ship.

The elder Mertoun now sought Norna's aid to save their son, who, he declared, was not Mordaunt, as she imagined, but Cleveland, whom he had trained as a pirate under his own real name of Vaughan, her former lover; and having lost trace of him till now, had come to Jarlshof, with his child by a Spanish wife, to atone for the misdeeds of his youth. On inquiry it appeared that Cleveland and Bunce had earned their pardon by acts of mercy in their piratical career, and were allowed to enter the king's service. Minna was further consoled by a penitent letter from her lover; Brenda became Mordaunt's wife; and the aberration of mind, occasioned by remorse at having caused her father's death, having died, Norna abandoned her supernatural pretensions and peculiar habits, and resumed her family name.

== Characters ==
Principal characters in bold

- **Basil Mertoun**, alias Vaughan, of Jarlshof
- **Mordaunt Mertoun**, his son
- Swertha, their housekeeper
- Sweyn Erickson, a fisherman
- **Magnus Troil**, an udaller
- **Minna and Brenda**, his daughters
- Euphane Fea, his housekeeper
- Eric Scambester, his servant
- **Ulla Troil**, alias Norna of the Fitful Head, his kinswoman
- Nicholas Strumpfer, alias Pacolet, her servant
- Niel Ronaldson, parish constable of Jarlshof
- **Triptolemus Yellowley**, of Harfa, a factor
- **Barbara (Baby) Yellowley**, his sister
- Tronda Dronsdaughter, their servant
- **Bryce Snailsfoot**, a pedlar
- **Claud Halcro**, a bard
- **Captain Clement Cleveland**, alias Vaughan, a pirate
- **John Bunce**, alias Frederick Altamont, his lieutenant
- Dick Fletcher, Bunce's associate
- Captain Goffe, a pirate
- Hawkins, his boatswain
- George Torfe, Provost of Kirkwall
- Captain Weatherfort, of HMS Halcyon

== Chapter summary ==
Advertisement: The Author of Waverley outlines the history of the pirate John Gow on which his narrative is based.

Volume One

Ch. 1: Some years before the story begins, the mysterious and melancholy Basil Mertoun and his young son Mordaunt arrive in Zetland, where Magnus Troil of Burgh Westra agrees to rent him the deserted Jarlshof castle.

Ch. 2: Basil is cheated by the locals: he dismisses his housekeeper Swertha, but following advice from Mordaunt she achieves reinstatement. During his father's black moods Mordaunt engages in social activities in the neighbourhood.

Ch. 3: Mordaunt's affections seem to hover between the contrasting Troil daughters Minna and Brenda.

Ch. 4: Returning to Jarlshof from Burgh Westra in a storm, Mordaunt seeks refuge at Harfra (or Stourburgh) with Triptolemus Yellowley, a factor from Yorkshire devoted to agricultural improvements, and his sister Barbara (Baby).

Ch. 5: The Yellowleys discuss their unexpected guest and are joined by a pedlar [Bruce Snailsfoot] and Norna of the Fitful-head.

Ch. 6: After apparently quelling the storm, Norna departs from Harfra and Mordaunt prepares to continue his journey.

Ch. 7: Back at Jarlshof, Mordaunt rescues a sailor from a shipwreck. Bruce, Norna, and some of the locals arrive on the scene.

Ch. 8: At the house of the parish constable Niel Ronaldson, the sailor introduces himself to Mordaunt as Captain Clement Cleveland and gives him a Spanish fowling-piece. Mordaunt provides him with a letter of introduction to Magnus.

Ch. 9: A month later Bryce sells Mordaunt material for a waistcoat which he intends to wear at a dance at Burgh Westra, though he has oddly not been invited.

Ch. 10: On a gloom-filled walk Mordaunt encounters Norna, who warns him that Cleveland, now in residence at Burgh Westra, is a serpent.

Ch. 11: On his way to Burgh Westra, Mordaunt joins company with the Yellowleys, Triptolemous intending to present his improvement plans to Magnus.

Ch. 12: At Burgh Westra, Mordaunt receives an awkward welcome from Magnus and his daughters. Claud Halcro, a local poet, makes light of such difficulties.

Volume Two

Ch. 1 (13): At dinner Mordaunt observes Cleveland paying attention to Minna.

Ch. 2 (14): Mordaunt is assailed by the simultaneous discourses of Halcro and Triptolemus before the dancing begins.

Ch. 3 (15): Halcro entertains some of the company, and Mordaunt observes the sword dance.

Ch. 4 (16): After a performance by masquers Brenda, who is one of their number, leads Mordaunt away and asks him to watch Cleveland. Mordaunt finds himself attracted to her.

Ch. 5 (17): The following day Cleveland saves Mordaunt at a whale hunt but repels his attempt to thank him.

Ch. 6 (18): Bryce appears with goods acquired from what Cleveland takes to be his companion ship; Mordaunt and Cleveland quarrel over which of them has the right to buy a box and a chaplet.

Ch. 7 (19): Minna and Brenda, who find themselves growing apart somewhat, are visited by contrasting dreams. Norna interrupts their sleep and tells them how she had accidentally caused the death of her father, who had wished her to marry Magnus rather than the lover to whom she had committed herself.

Ch. 8 (20): Minna and Brenda have a difference of opinion over the respective merits of Mordaunt and Cleveland, with whom Minna is in love.

Ch. 9 (21): Norna tells the fortunes of the assembled company.

Ch. 10 (22): As they walk by the sea Cleveland tells Minna he cannot be Mordaunt's friend. He relates his story, and she is appalled by the ruthlessness he has adopted to command respect.

Ch. 11 (23): At night Minna hears Cleveland outside the window singing a farewell song, followed by sounds of a struggle with Mordaunt.

Ch. 12 (24): Swertha alerts Basil to his son's disappearance and he institutes a search, going himself to consult Norna.

Ch. 13 (25): At Saint Ninian's (or Ringan's) church Norna advises Basil to seek his son at the Kirkwall Fair.

Ch. 14 (26): Concerned about Minna's depression, Magnus takes his daughters to consult Norna. On the way he confirms and augments her story, naming her lover as Vaughan, and indicating that she gave birth to a child who disappeared and is probably dead.

Ch. 15 (27): Magnus and his daughter arrive at Norna's burgh and are received by her dwarf servant Pacolet.

Volume Three

Ch. 1 (28): Norna conducts a magical rite and gives Minna a leaden heart to wear as a sign of hope.

Ch. 2 (29): Norna and Pacolet throw the provisions brought by Magnus into the sea. He and his daughters find shelter in a deserted hut.

Ch. 3 (30): Magnus and his daughters find Halcro and Triptolemus in the hut. The factor tells how he is in quest of a cache of coins found at Harfa which were removed by a dwarf, evidently Pacolet, who arrives with a letter from Norna advising Magnus to go with his daughters to the Kirkwall Fair.

Ch. 4 (31): Cleveland meets his lieutenant John Bunce in Kirkwall and tells him of his intention to give up piracy. He also indicates that the wounded Mordaunt is in Norna's care.

Ch. 5 (32): Cleveland beats Bryce, who has bought the captain's clothes from Swertha. He is arrested but rescued by his fellow-pirates.

Ch. 6 (33): On the island of Hoy, Norna reveals herself to Mordaunt as his mother and wishes him to Marry Minna.

Ch. 7 (34): On board ship the pirates agree that Cleveland should assume temporary command. He proposes to the Provost of Kirkwall that the ship load up at Stromness, out of the way of an expected government frigate, the Hispaniola, and offers himself as security for the pirates' good conduct.

Ch. 8 (35): The Provost nominates Triptolemus to pilot the pirates' ship to Stromness, but he escapes with Goffe's connivance.

Ch. 9 (36): The pirates capture the ship bringing Magnus and his daughters to Kirkwall, and send the sisters ashore with a message to the Provost threatening reprisals if Cleveland is harmed.

Ch. 10 (37): The Provost tells the sisters and Halcro he does not have the authority to release Cleveland. Norna appears to Minna and Cleveland meeting in St Magnus Cathedral and insists they part for ever. Cleveland evades his guards and Minna and Halcro agree with the Provost that they should attempt to get him and the other pirates to leave the country.

Ch. 11 (38): After conducting Cleveland from the cathedral by a secret passage, Norna says that if he stays in Orkney he will die. He is taken on board ship and releases Magnus.

Ch. 12 (39): Cleveland tells Bunce of his determination to go ashore at Stennis to see Minna. Bunce and Dick Fletcher plan to bring both Cleveland and Minna aboard by force. Bunce delivers Cleveland's letter to Minna at Stennis. Magnus receives Mordaunt as restored to his favour.

Ch. 13 (40): Mordaunt allows the sisters to meet Cleveland at the Stones of Stennis. Their parting scene is interrupted by the arrival of the pirates who are defeated by Mordaunt's armed guard, Cleveland and others being taken prisoner. From the prison window they observe the capture of the pirate ship by the Hispaniola.

Ch. 14 (41): In the cathedral Basil (Vaughan) tells Norna that Cleveland (not Mordaunt) is their son, Clement Vaughan. He took him to the island of Hispaniola, where Basil married a Spanish woman who gave birth to Mordaunt, and eventually he believed Clement to have perished after being marooned by a rebellious crew on a desert island. Among the proofs of Cleveland's parentage are the box and chaplet of Ch. 18.

Ch. 15 (42): The Provost believes that Cleveland will obtain a free pardon in London on account of his protection of two women of quality in the Spanish Main. Brenda marries Mordaunt, whose father is believed to have retired to a foreign convent. Norna becomes a pious Christian, and Minna lives with cheerful resignation after hearing of Cleveland's honourable and gallant death in government service in the Spanish Main.

== Reception ==
Critical assessments of The Pirate differed widely. A third of the reviews were almost entirely enthusiastic, a smaller number were dismissive, and the rest came up with 'middle rank' verdicts. Norna was widely admired as a more sublime Meg Merrilees, and her poetry attracted high praise even from reviewers who were otherwise unimpressed. The Yellowleys were found novel and highly entertaining. Other favourite characters were Bunce, Halcro (albeit over-extended), and the pirate crew. Contrasting pairs were admired in Brenda and Minna, and in Cleveland and Mordaunt. Several reviewers complained about repetition of characters from previous novels, but others discerned discriminating facets.
