= John Gow =

Scottish pirate

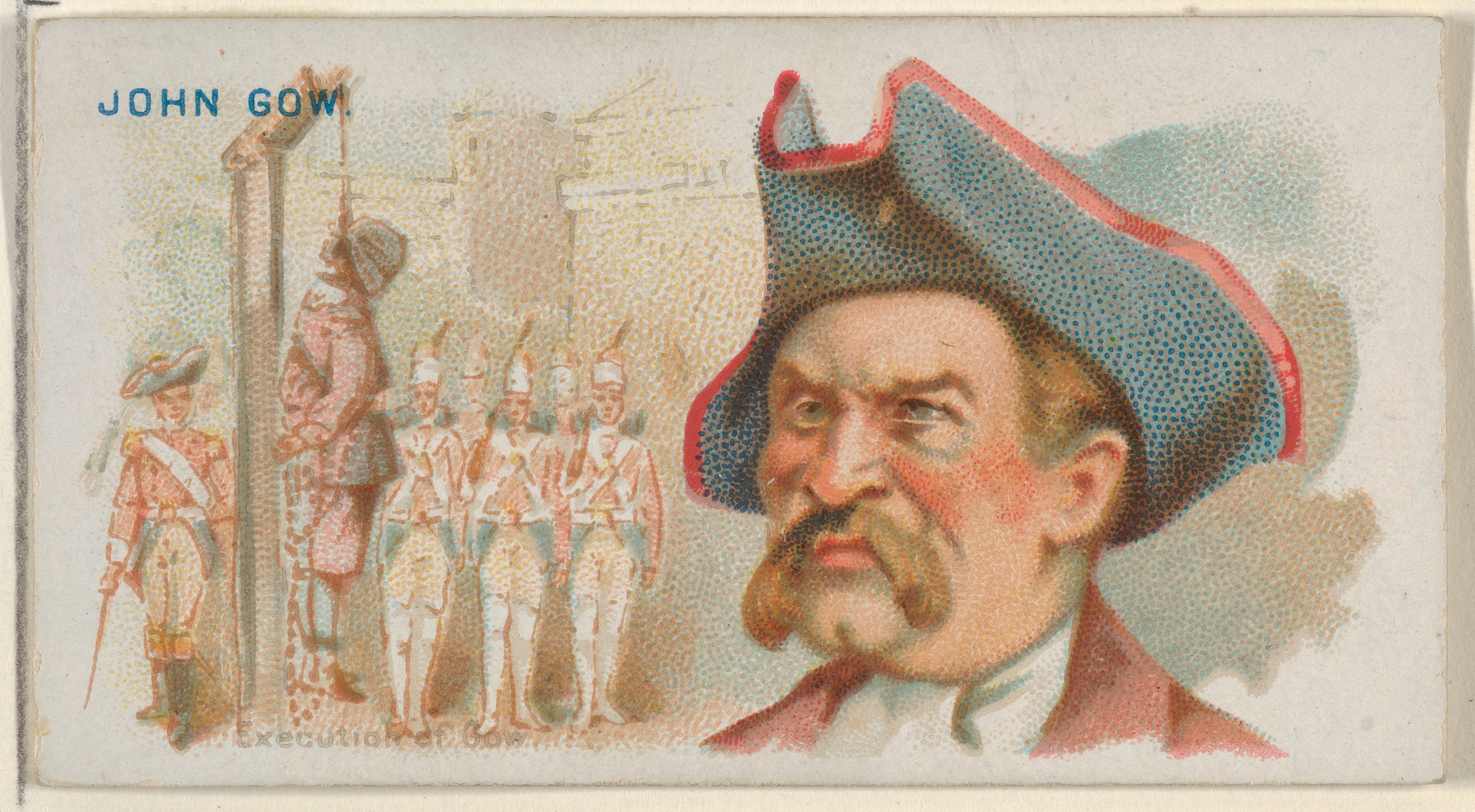
- Born: c. 1698; Wick, Caithness
- Died: June 11, 1725 (aged 26–27); Execution Dock, London
- Piratical career
- Type: Pirate
- Years active: 1724–1725

John Gow (c. 1698–11 June 1725) was a pirate whose short career was immortalised by Charles Johnson in the 1725 work The History and Lives of All the Most Notorious Pirates and Their Crews. Little is known of his life, except from an account by Daniel Defoe, which is often considered unreliable, the report on his execution, and an account by Mr. Alan Fea, descendant of his captor, published in 1912, almost two centuries after his death.

== Early life ==
Gow was probably born in Wick, Caithness, to William Gow, a merchant, and Margaret Calder. He was raised in Stromness, Orkney, where he went to school and learned to sail a ship.

== Pirate ==
John Gow in The Chronicles of Newgate (1884), by Arthur Griffiths

John Gow in Lives of the Most Remarkable Criminals (1735), ed. Arthur L. Hayward

Prior to August 1724 he crewed a voyage from London to Lisbon and back, during which he plotted to seize control of the vessel. He failed to attract sufficient numbers, however, and the effort went nowhere. In London, word spread about the attempt, so Gow fled to Amsterdam, where he joined the Canary Islands-bound Caroline as second mate.

After several months' layover in Santa Cruz on the island of La Palma, on 3 November 1724 the Caroline departed for Genoa, Italy, with a cargo of beeswax, leather, and woolens. The shipboard climate, however, was troubled. There were complaints about the food on board the ship, and Freneau, the captain of the Caroline, was accused of treating the other crewmen of the vessel improperly. Grousing of short allowance, the crewmen of the Caroline started to disobey some of the captain's orders. The captain, realising that his orders were being disobeyed, consulted his mate. The two men agreed to stash some small arms in the cabin so they could defend themselves in case of mutiny. Unfortunately for the captain, two of the conspirators on the upper deck overheard the conversation.

Not realising that Gow was the ring leader of the attempted mutiny, Freneau ordered Gow to prepare arms to defend the crew. Upon hearing this, the mutineers decided to act that night. At ten p.m., after half the ship's company had retired following evening prayer, shots echoed across the deck. Told that someone had fallen overboard, Freneau ran to the rail, where he was stabbed in the neck and shot twice in the stomach by Gow, then thrown overboard by the other conspirators. Still alive, he managed to clutch a rope dangling from the side of the ship, but when the conspirators realised this, they cut the rope and he tumbled into the sea. The next morning, the remainder of the crew was given the option of following their captain or joining the mutineers. Accounts indicate that they all accepted their former position. The ship was renamed Revenge.

Over the next few weeks the Revenge began attacking British ships in the area, starting with the Delight (12 November) and the Sarah (21 November). The crews were usually set adrift, though some deemed useful were given the option of joining Gow's crew. Over the next few months, Gow attacked several other ships plying the region.

== Capture ==
After a successful career as a pirate off the Iberian Peninsula, Gow decided to return to the Orkney Islands. He was running low on supplies, and the authorities were on his trail. Arriving in early 1725, he adopted the name Mr. Smith (Gow being Gaelic for Smith), and renamed his vessel the George, and passed as a wealthy trader, even courting a Miss Gordon. He was eventually recognised by a merchant passing through the islands, and his true identity was revealed. According to other accounts, some of his prisoners escaped there and notified the authorities. Rather than surrender, Gow and his men successfully raided the Hall of Clestrain on 10 February 1725, but when they attempted to attack another remote mansion, they ran aground on the Calf of Eday, where they were captured.

== Death ==
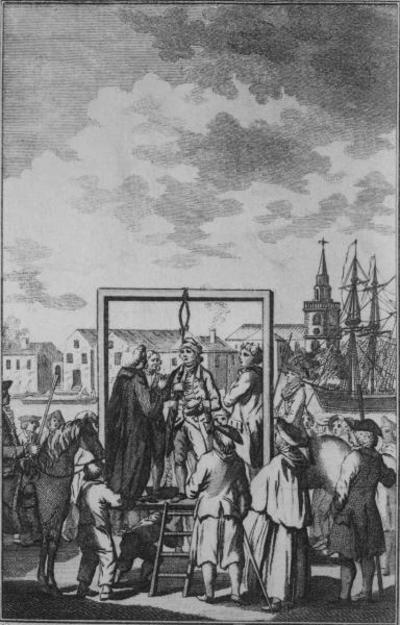
The Execution Dock, where John Gow's adventures came to an end

According to the Newgate Calendar, Gow was slow to die when he hanged. To relieve his pain, some of his friends pulled at his legs, but this just broke the rope, causing him to tumble to the ground, from where he was gathered up and hanged again.

After his death, his body (along with those of his crew) was left in the River Thames. The bodies were then tarred and suspended on the riverbank, as a warning to other would-be pirates.

He was tried alongside pirate Brigstock Weaver, whose crimes were unrelated to Gow's. While Gow was hanged for his piracies, Weaver was reprieved and soon pardoned.

== In literature ==
Daniel Defoe wrote a fictional account, The Pirate Gow. Gow also served as the model for Captain Cleveland in Sir Walter Scott's novel The Pirate. Gow was also featured in some of the writings of George Mackay Brown. The factual account of the capture of Gow was featured in the book The Real Captain Cleveland by Allan Fea (1860-1956), a distant relative of the pirate catcher, and published by Secker, London, in 1912.
