= The Princess Bride (disambiguation) =

The Princess Bride is a 1987 American film directed by Rob Reiner.

The Princess Bride may also refer to:

- The Princess Bride (novel), 1973 fantasy romance novel by William Goldman, upon which the film is based
- The Princess Bride (soundtrack), 1987 soundtrack for the film
- Home Movie: The Princess Bride, 2020 tribute performance of the film

== See also ==
- King's Quest VII: The Princeless Bride, video game
