= Gold Dust (novel) =

1990 novel by Ibrahim al-Koni

- 2008 edition published by The American University in Cairo Press
- Author: Ibrahim Al-Koni
- Language: Arabic
- Genre: Novel
- Publisher: Dar Attanweer
- Publication date: 1992
- Pages: 160
- ISBN: 9781855130388
- OCLC: 1021298536
- Website: https://www.worldcat.org/oclc/1021298536&referer=brief_results

Gold Dust (Arabic: التبر) is a 1990 novel by Libyan writer Ibrahim al-Koni. The plot centres a piebald Mahri camel.

== Plot ==
The novel follows Ukhayyad, a young Tuareg nomad from the Libyan desert, and his prized camel. The camel falls ill after intercourse with a female camel, so Ukhayyad decides he must be healed by a powerful plant known to induce insanity. Although Ukhayyad is mocked for his devotion to the camel, he remains loyal.

Ukhayyad marries and has a son, but poverty forces him to sell the camel to a man named Dodo, who claims to be his wife's cousin. The camel repeatedly escapes to return to Ukhayyad before being reclaimed by Dodo's men. When Ukhayyad requests to repossess the camel, Dodo offers to do so, in exchange for Ukhayyad's wife. Ukhayyad agrees, and Dodo gives him a small bag of gold dust as well, which he at first declines to accept. He is reunited with his beloved camel, but people begin to claim that he "sold his wife and child for a handful of gold dust."

== Analysis ==
The novel focuses on the two main themes of sin and freedom. Rather than a more conventional, frequently sexual, understanding of "sin," the novel instead explores sin through a mystical, Sufi lens, where sin is a part of the human heart and affects all of its aspects.

- The semiotic analysis of the novel:

Ibrahim al-Koni's novel is based on the symbol that presents a mystical narrative that differs from the apparent novel. And under these two symbols falls a series of other symbols. Everything inside the novel is a symbol, or rather a sign, according to al-Koni's Cosmic Linguistic Dictionary. The dream is a sign, the secret is a sign, the cave drawings are a sign, the desert animals are a sign, and others. A sign that the latter did not succeed in reading it, but he kept holding on to the ablaq until the vow was overturned and Ukhayyad became the sacrifice offered to the divine Tanit. Exile is freedom, in which a person is emancipated from the captivity of ownership and is liberated, except that Ukhayyad and because he is a blind slave, that is, he is a slave who does not realize that he is a slave, so he could not be freed while he was alive, and perhaps he was liberated when he died, that is, when he was able at the moment of his death to understand the meaning of the sign.

- The stylistic analysis of the novel, and this analysis became clear through the following:
1. The linguistic formation, where the author chose suspense as a stylistic feature that forms the bridge between the narrator and the reader, and for this function he used vocabulary from the desert linguistic lexicon, and the technique of description, repetition, presentation and delay was used. In addition to the use of multiple narrative techniques, the most important of which are interrogative, forbidding, and others.
2. The graphic composition appears clearly through the use of metaphor and poetics in the structures and allegorical formation in terms of description and depiction, as well as the use of graphic images, allegory, metaphor, metonymy, renewal, personification, and simile, all with the aim of transporting the reader to the miraculous world of the novel and integrating it with it.
- The semiological analysis of the novel:

Semiology was clearly present throughout the novel. The duality of survival and annihilation dominates the desert space. The text is based on mythology where al-Koni employed symbols, allusions, and myths. The legend appears within the text alive and interactive, shaping the course of events and affecting the development of the characters. The animal occupies a great place in al-Koni's works, and has a major role in the novel. Al-Koni relied on intertextuality at the beginning of some chapters of the novel to play a preparatory and indicative role that indirectly indicates what will happen in the events, as well as on the mystical feature in the narration of the novel.

== Translations ==
A Japanese translation of the novel won the Japanese Committee for Translation Award in 1997.

Gold Dust was translated into English by the American translator and academic Elliott Colla and published in 2008, for which Colla was named a runner-up for the 2009 Banipal Prize for Arabic Literary Translation.
