= Philip Roche (pirate) =

Irish pirate

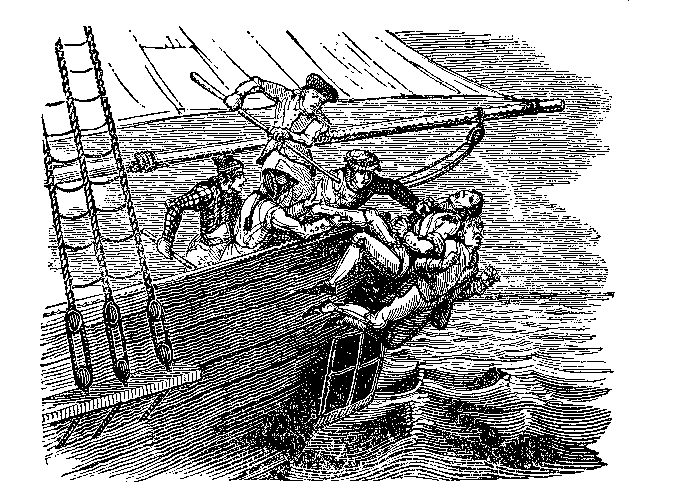
Roche and his Villainous Companions Throwing their Victims Overboard, from the Newgate Calendar, 1780

Philip Roche (c. 1693–1723) was an Irish pirate active in the seas of northern Europe, best known for murdering the crews and captains of ships he and his men took over.

== History ==
Roche was involved in insurance scams, insuring ships then intentionally wrecking them, occasionally using the alias John Eustace. In November 1721 Roche and three associates booked passage on a French vessel sailing to Nantes. Roche was charismatic and had knowledge of seafaring, and convinced the ship's master to let him handle the vessel. At a signal they rose up, slaughtered the French crew, and threw the captain overboard. They debated where to sail next, including Newfoundland. Afraid of being discovered, they modified the ship's appearance, altered the ship's logbooks, and renamed it Mary before sailing to Rotterdam to sell its cargo.

While there they took more cargo on board along with a cargo master named Annesly. One night later they threw Annesly overboard and stole the cargo. At a French port they heard rumors about their own exploits and quickly put to sea, sailing to Scotland where they quietly dispersed. Authorities seized the ship but Roche had run away.

Roche was eventually found in London and imprisoned in Newgate. Tried for piracy, he was found guilty and hanged in August 1723. The public was disappointed at the execution: Roche "was so ill at the time that he could not make any public declaration of his abhorrence of the crime for which he suffered." In a Dutch newspaper from august 10th, 1723, however, it was written that Roche was not hanged after all, and that he had died in prison.

== See also ==
- Admiralty court, the court in which Roche and his associates were tried.
