= Dan Conlin =

Canadian historian

Dan Conlin is a maritime historian and museum curator in Halifax, Nova Scotia.

Born in Berwick, Nova Scotia, he received a Bachelor of Journalism degree with a concentration in History from Carleton University in Ottawa, Ontario in 1986. Conlin worked at the Canadian Broadcasting Corporation, mainly in Radio with CBC Ottawa but also at CBC Television in Halifax aswell as As It Happens in Toronto. Conlin also did two volunteer postings overseas as a teacher in Swaziland in 1989 and an archaeological field worker in Namibia in 1993. He returned home to Nova Scotia in 1994 and earned a master's degree in history at Saint Mary's University in Halifax in 1996 with a thesis entitled "A Private War in the Caribbean Nova Scotia Privateering, 1793-1805". Conlin became Curator of Marine History at the Maritime Museum of the Atlantic in 1997. He curated and wrote the museum's permanent Titanic exhibit and temporary exhibits such as St. Louis: Ship of Fate. Conlin at one time also taught one credit course in the Atlantic Canada Studies department at Saint Mary's University. He is a contributor to the Oxford Companion to Canadian History and is most recently author of the 96-page monograph Pirates of the Atlantic: Robbery, murder and mayhem off the Canadian East Coast. In 2013, he became the curator at the Canadian Museum of Immigration at Pier 21 in Halifax and in 2014 published his second, 134-page monograph War Through the Lens: The Canadian Army Film and Photo Unit 1941-1945, an illustrated history of the Canadian Army Film and Photo Unit, based on oral history interviews he conducted at the journalism department of Carleton University. Conlin, now a retired museum curator, gave a speech for the opening of an exhibit , titled A History Exposed: The Enslavement of Black People in Canada, guest-curated by Dr. Afua Coope at the Canadian Museum of Immigration at Pier 21, Conlin described in this speech the history of slavery in Nova Scotia, which he stated was often overlooked.
