= Anubis (novel) =

Novel by Ibrahim Kuni

Anubis (Novel)
- Author: Ibrahim Kuni
- Language: Arabic
- Genre: Fiction; fantasy
- Publisher: Arab Institute for Research & Publishing
- Publication date: 2002
- Publication place: Lebanon
- Pages: 240

Anubis is a 2002 fantasy novel written by Libyan author Ibrahim Kuni revolving around mythologies, incest, patricide, animal metamorphosis, and human sacrifice, in addition to the Tuareg folklore about Anubis.

== Reviews ==
Researcher Manal Abu Shuereb, argued that the title of the novel is "one of the most significant forms of modern titling revolving around mythology and symbolism".

Amira El Zein also praised the work
