= Cape Lopez =

Headland on the coast of Gabon

Coordinates: 0.633°S 8.700°E

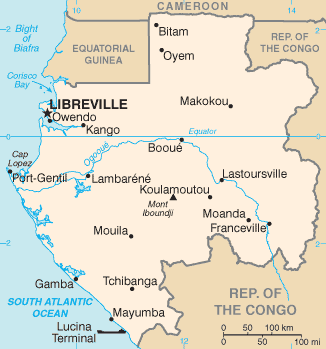
Map of Gabon, with Cape Lopez on the extreme left.

Cape Lopez (French: Cap Lopez) is a headland on the coast of Gabon, west central Africa. The westernmost point of Gabon, it separates the Gulf of Guinea from the South Atlantic Ocean. Cape Lopez is the northernmost point of a low, wooded island between two mouths of the Ogooué River. There is an oil terminal at the southeast side of the cape, and the seaport of Port-Gentil lies about 10 km southeast of the cape. A lighthouse has existed on the Cape since 1897; the current tower was built in 1911, but has been inactive for many years and is in danger of collapsing from erosion.

It is named after the Portuguese explorer Lopes Gonçalves, who reached it circa 1474. In 1602, the Dutch explorer and writer Pieter de Marees published some images of its people.

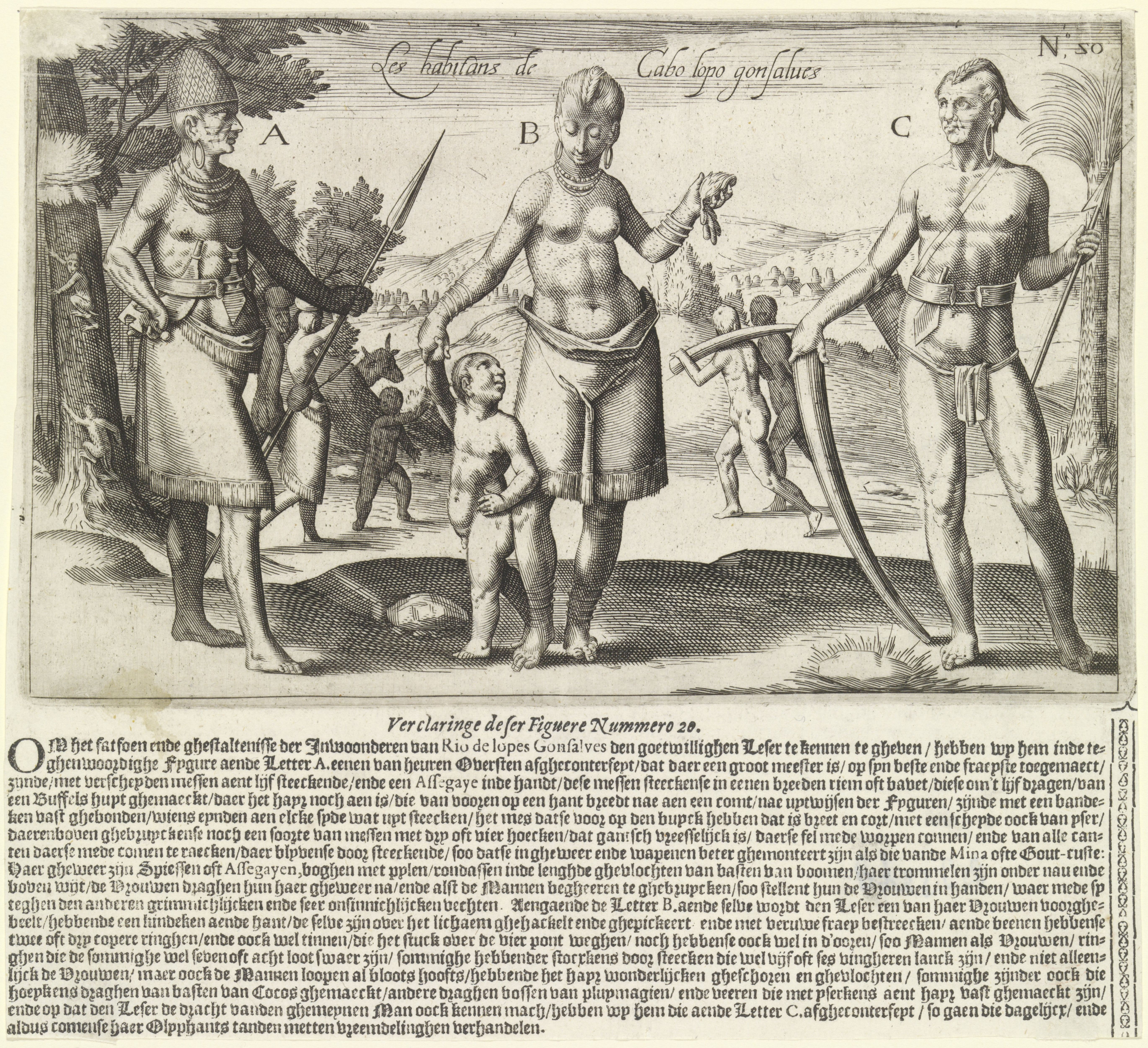
Inhabitants of Kaap de Lopo Gonsalves, 1602

== See also ==
- Battle of Cape Lopez
- Karaburun Peninsula
