= John Fenn (pirate) =

English pirate

- Born: England
- Died: c. May 1723; Caribbean
- Piratical career
- Type: Pirate
- Years active: c. June 1719 – c. May 1723
- Base of operations: Caribbean
- Commands: Frigate Morning Star (c. 1721 – c. August 1722), Frigate Antelope (c. December 1722 – c. April 1723)

John Fenn (died May 1723) was an early 18th-century English pirate who sailed with Captain Bartholomew Roberts and later had a brief partnership with Thomas Anstis.

== Biography ==
Although much of his early career is unrecorded, he was a member of Captain Roberts's fleet in June 1719 to April 1720, until leaving with fellow member Thomas Anstis, who was awarded command of the 21-gun Morning Star shortly before leaving the West Indies for the West African coast during the night of 21 April 1721. Remaining with Anstis in the Caribbean, Fenn participated in the capture of three or four merchant ships near Hispaniola, Jamaica and Martinique during the month of June before being given command of the 21-gun Morning Star.

After quarrelling for some time, Anstis and Fenn decided to end their piratical careers and petitioned King George I for a royal pardon claiming they had been forced into piracy by Roberts. After nine months camped in an uninhabited island off the coast of Cuba, having received no response from the British government, they decided to resume their piracy in August 1722.

However, running into a violent storm shortly after their departure, Fenn's ship was wrecked on Grand Cayman Island (it may have been during this storm and wreck that Fenn lost his right hand). Anstis, in the process of rescuing Fenn and his crew, many pirates were still ashore when two British warships hove into sight.

Chased by the Royal Navy men-of-war, the pirates were able to escape after the winds died down to a dead calm, rowing the Good Fortune to safety. After their flight to the Bay of Honduras, a frigate was captured to replace the lost Morning Star and the two met with success capturing several ships in the Bahamas during the next several months. However, while careening their ships at Tobago in April 1723, they were surprised by the British warship HMS Winchelsey during which Fenn's ship was lost. Forced to run into the wooded interior of Tobago, he was captured a day later and brought back to Antigua where he was found guilty of piracy and hanged with six of his crew the following month.
