= Thomas Anstis =

English pirate

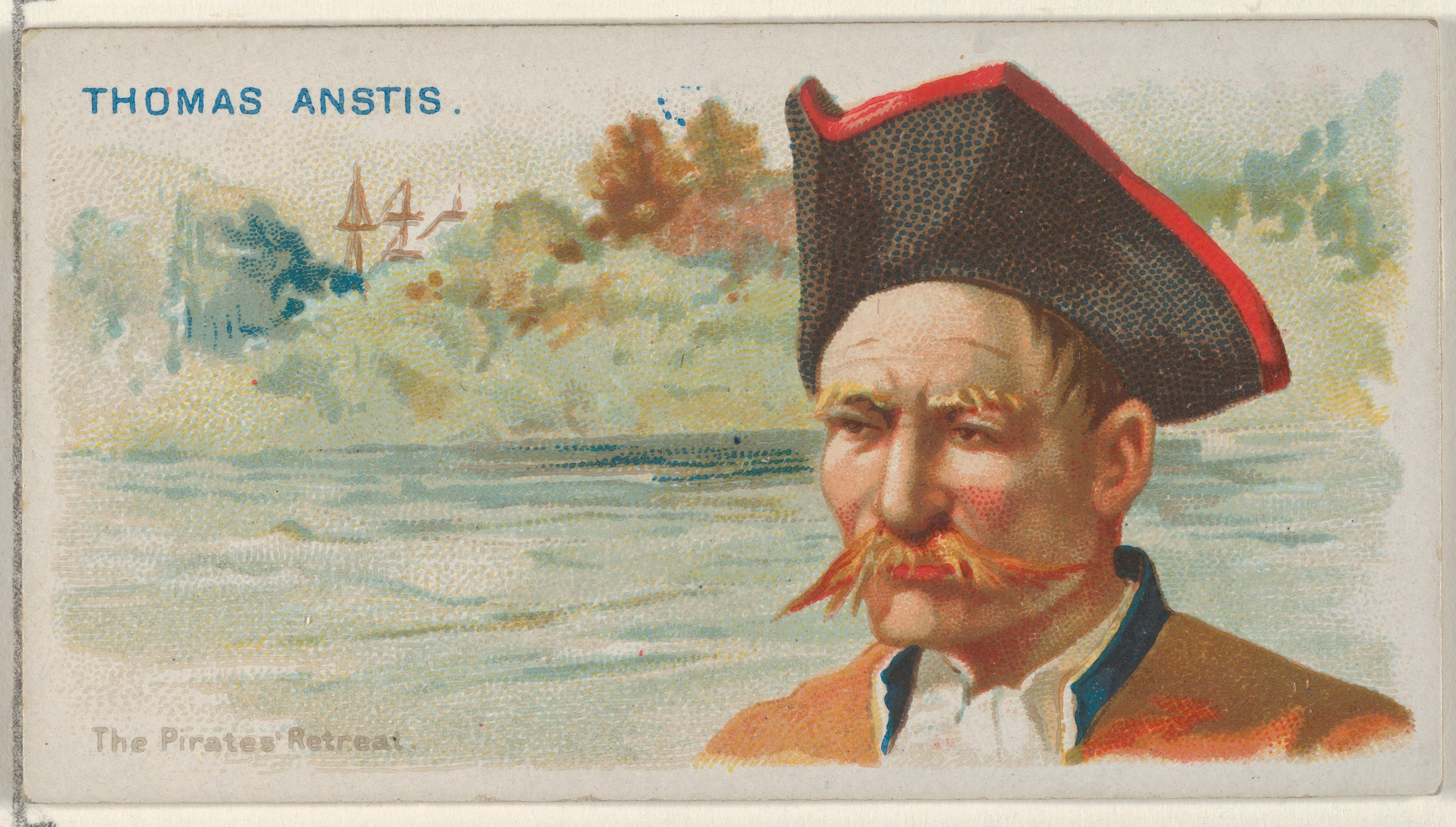
- Anstis on an illustration for Allen & Ginter cigarette cards, c. 1888
- Born: England
- Died: April 1723; Caribbean Sea
- Piratical career
- Type: Pirate
- Years active: 18 April 1721 - April 1723
- Rank: Captain
- Base of operations: Caribbean Sea
- Commands: Brigantine Good Fortune (18 April 1721 - April 1723)

Thomas Anstis (died April 1723) was an early 18th-century pirate, who served under Captain Howell Davis and Captain Bartholomew Roberts, before setting up on his own account, raiding shipping on the eastern coast of the American colonies and in the Caribbean during what is often referred to as the "Golden Age of Piracy".

== Early career ==
Anstis is first recorded as a member of the sloop Buck, which sailed from New Providence in the Bahamas in 1718 (the ship having arrived there with Governor Woodes Rogers). During the course of the voyage, Anstis conspired with six other crew members (including Walter Kennedy and Howell Davis) to attempt a mutiny aboard the ship which, upon doing so, stated their intentions to sail southward as pirates. Howell Davis was elected captain. After Davis' death Bartholomew Roberts replaced him as captain, and eventually had several ships. Anstis commanded one of these, the brigantine Good Fortune.

== Roberts, Fenn & Admiral Flowers ==
Anstis' flag, described as “hoisted a Union Flag, with Four blazing Balls”.

Anstis' pirate flag, described as a “Black Flagg with Death’s Head”."

During the night of 18 April 1721, Roberts' ships headed for Africa, but Anstis and his crew in the Good Fortune slipped away in the night and continued to operate in the Caribbean. Between Hispaniola and Jamaica, the Good Fortune plundered two vessels. Aboard one, the Irwin, Anstis's crew committed gang rape and murder against a female passenger. Afterwards they stopped to careen their vessel.

Continuing onward towards Bermuda, Anstis spotted a treasure ship out from Guinea heading towards the Carolinas, Morning Star. After its capture, the ship was outfitted with 32 guns and placed in the command of ships gunner John Fenn, Anstis opting to retain command of the smaller Good Fortune because of her superior handling. The two ships continued to sail along the southeastern coast of the colonies until fighting began to break out among many of the forced crew members, and they decided to petition George I of Great Britain for a pardon, claiming they had been forced into piracy by Anstis and Roberts.

Sailing to an island off Cabo San Antonio in Cuba, the crew awaited a reply from the British government for nine months until August 1722, when they received news from their courier ship that their pleas had been ignored, and the king had sent Admiral Sir John Flowers to eradicate the pirates. On their southward course they encountered the Grand Caymans, where the Morning Star ran aground and, as the survivors were being rescued by the Good Fortune, the pirates were sighted and pursued by HMS Hector and HMS Adventure. Anstis was forced to cut his anchor cable and run, finally making his escape under oars when the fresh wind subsided. Anstis lost more than forty of his men on Grand Cayman, most of these being captured by a landing party from the two Royal Navy vessels, under the command of Flowers.

Anstis and Fenn (who had been rescued from Grand Cayman before the interference of the Royal Navy) now sailed to the Bay of Honduras and careened on an offshore island, capturing three or four prizes en route and augmenting their depleted crew from their captives. Anstis next sailed for the Bahama Islands in early December 1722. On the way, he captured a sloop named Antelope, which he added to his squadron, and then a 24-gun ship, which was entrusted to Fenn.

Not all sources agree on the details of Anstis' associates or the ships in his group. Some sources have Anstis keeping Morning Star for himself and putting Brigstock Weaver in command of Good Fortune. Weaver's ship had been captured by Roberts and Montigny la Palisse, who forced Weaver to sign their Articles. When Anstis left Roberts, Weaver was first mate on the Good Fortune. Weaver eventually made his way back to England where he was pardoned after his trial.

== Final days ==
The pirates put in at Tobago in April 1723, intending to careen their new vessels, and having just started the task, they were surprised by the British man-of-war Admiral Sir John Flowers HMS Winchelsea. Antis and his men were forced to burn the ship and the sloop and flee into the island's interior, but the Winchelsea's marines overtook and captured them. Anstis escaped again in his swift brigantine Good Fortune, but his crew, discouraged by their losses, murdered him as he slept in his hammock, and took prisoner all who remained loyal. The mutineers then surrendered to Dutch authorities in Curaçao, where they received amnesty and their prisoners were hanged.

== See also ==
- Montigny la Palisse, another of Roberts' captains who, like Anstis, took his prize ship and abandoned Roberts.
- John Phillips (pirate), who was forced into piracy under Anstis.

== Bibliography ==
- Botting, Douglas. The Pirates (The Seafarers; v.1). Alexandria, Virginia: Time-Life Books, 1978. ISBN 0-8094-2652-8
- Burl, Aubrey (2006) Black Barty: Bartholomew Roberts and his pirate crew 1718-1723. Sutton Publishing. ISBN 0-7509-4312-2
