= Savage Mostyn =

Vice-Admiral Savage Mostyn
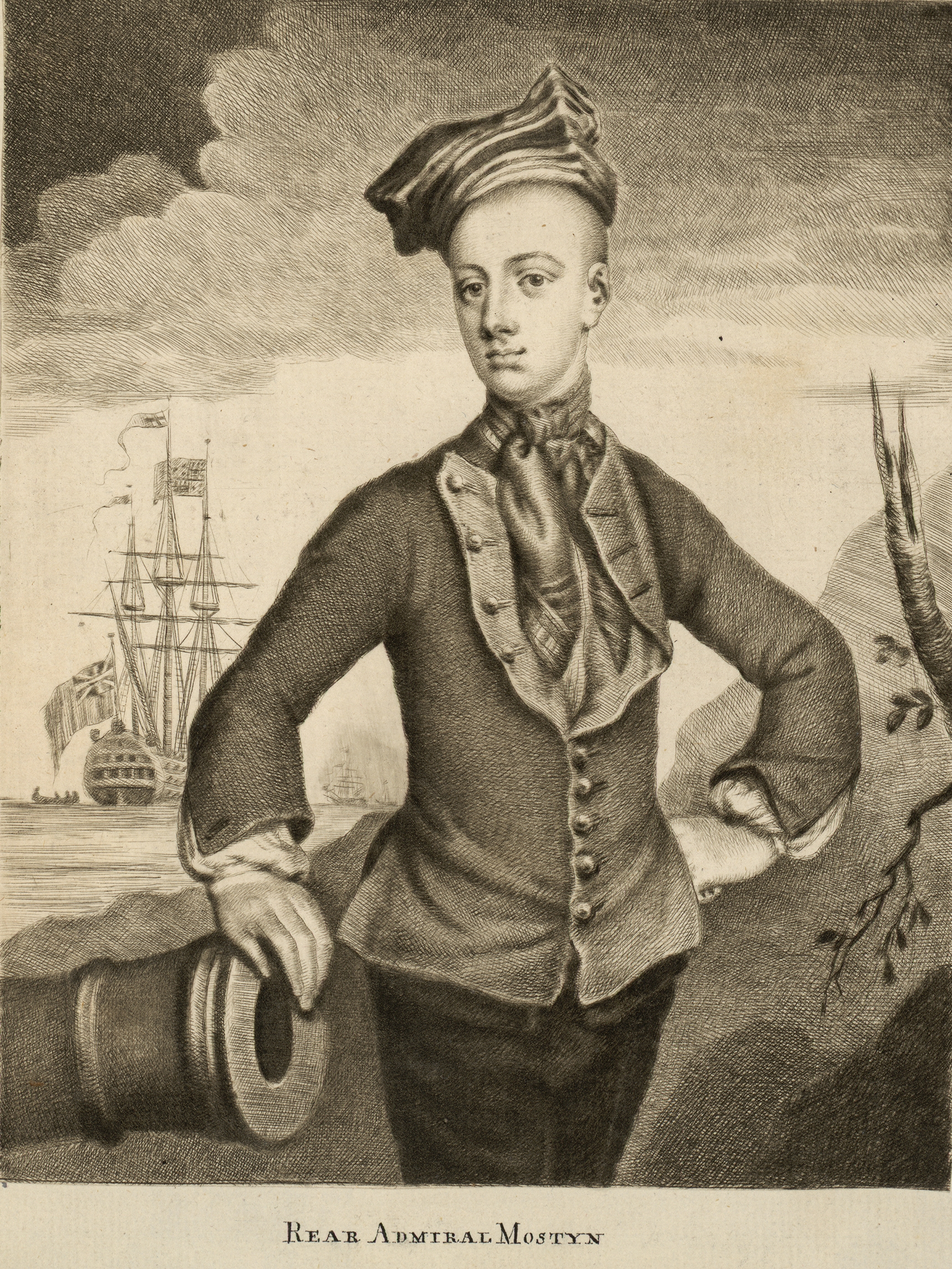
- Born: c. 1713
- Died: 16 September 1757
- Relatives: Sir Roger Mostyn, 3rd Baronet (father); Daniel Finch, 8th Earl of Winchilsea (cousin)
- Military career
- Allegiance: Great Britain
- Branch: Royal Navy
- Service years: c.1733–1757
- Rank: Vice-Admiral
- Commands: HMS Duke; HMS Seaford; HMS Winchelsea; HMS Deptford; HMS Suffolk; HMS Hampton Court; Commander-in-Chief, The Nore; Comptroller of the Navy; Lord Commissioner of the Admiralty
- Conflicts: War of the Austrian Succession; Battle of Cartagena de Indias; French and Indian War; Seven Years' War

Vice-Admiral Savage Mostyn (c. 1713 – 16 September 1757) was an officer of the Royal Navy who saw service during the War of the Austrian Succession and the Seven Years' War. He embarked on a political career, and was a Member of Parliament, Comptroller of the Navy, and one of the Lords of the Admiralty.

Mostyn was born into a well connected family. He went to sea and quickly rose through the ranks to command his own ships. By the outbreak of the War of the Austrian Succession he was a captain, and served with several of the leading naval officers of the day in operations off the British coast, and in the Caribbean. While sailing off the French coast in 1744, Mostyn became involved in an incident which almost blighted his career. His squadron chased down several French ships, with Mostyn being close to engaging them, but considering the risks of attacking while unsupported too great, he drew away and allowed the French to escape. His actions were approved of by the Admiralty, but sensitive to criticism, Mostyn demanded a court martial, which acquitted him of blame. Public opinion was against him however, especially when it was learnt that Mostyn's powerful relations may have had a hand in influencing the court.

His naval career was largely unaffected however, and he served in several cruising squadrons and captured a number of privateers. He entered politics in 1747, representing the constituency of Weobley until his death, and was involved in the administration of the navy as Comptroller, and as a Lord of the Admiralty. He was advanced to flag rank and served in a junior role in commanding several of the fleets of the Seven Years' War, until his death in 1757.

== Family and early life ==
Savage Mostyn was born circa 1713, a younger son of Sir Roger Mostyn, 3rd Baronet, and his wife Lady Essex Finch, the daughter of Daniel Finch, 7th Earl of Winchilsea.

He entered Westminster School at the age of eleven in June 1725. He was appointed a lieutenant of the 60-gun HMS Pembroke on 2 March 1734. He went on to serve aboard the 100-gun HMS Britannia during her time as the flagship of Sir John Norris, before being advanced to his own command, that of the fireship HMS Duke, on 3 July 1739. Duke was attached to Rear-Admiral Nicholas Haddock's fleet off Cádiz, and having impressed Haddock, Mostyn was given command of the 24-gun HMS Seaford on 17 December 1739. The Admiralty confirmed him in his rank on 6 March 1740.

He went on to serve on several ships in quick succession during 1740, taking command of the 24-gun HMS Winchelsea in April, and later that year moving to the 60-gun HMS Deptford. With Deptford Mostyn went out to the West Indies with Sir Chaloner Ogle's fleet, and later served under Vice-Admiral Edward Vernon, during the attempts to capture Cartagena in March and April 1741. Mostyn took command of the 70-gun HMS Suffolk in December 1743 and joined Sir John Norris's fleet. He was present with Norris off Dungeness on 24 February 1744, when the British intercepted a French fleet under the Comte de Rocquefeuil which was carrying troops for a planned invasion of Britain. Norris chased the French fleet away, until they were scattered by a storm.

== Chasing the French ==
Mostyn took command of the 70-gun HMS Hampton Court in April 1744 and was assigned to Sir John Balchen's fleet. By early 1745 Mostyn was cruising off Ushant with three other ships, HMS Captain, HMS Dreadnought and HMS Sunderland. On 6 January they fell in with three French ships; Neptune, Fleuron and Mars, and chased them. Neptune and Fleuron were 74-gun ships, while Mars was a smaller vessel, a former English privateer. Mars broke away from the other two French ships, and was pursued by Captain, which captured the French ship that evening. Sunderland lost her fore-topmast and fell behind, leaving Hampton Court and Dreadnought to pursue the remaining two French ships alone. Mostyn soon closed on the French, but Dreadnought still lagged behind. After waiting another day and night in the hope that Dreadnought would catch up, Mostyn abandoned the chase, fearing that he was too close to the French shore, and that he would be overwhelmed by the combined firepower of his opponents if he attacked alone. After his return to port, Mostyn justified his actions, claiming that the choppy, squally weather caused his ship to heel over so far as to render his lower gunports inoperable, while the French vessels sat higher in the water and could have used theirs. Without Dreadnought to support him, Mostyn argued that he could have been overwhelmed, had he risked an attack.

=== Controversy ===
The Admiralty accepted the explanation, and the matter might have passed, had Mostyn not written to the Navy Board to request his masts be replaced with smaller ones. The Board declined the request, replying that 'as there has never been any Complaint, of her before, that She will do very well.' Mostyn read into the reply an imputation that he was inventing a cause for his recent failure that did not exist. He immediately petitioned for a court-martial to examine his conduct, to which the Admiralty acquiesced. Mostyn was duly acquitted, the court determining that he had done 'his duty as an experienced good Officer, and as a Man of Courage and Conduct.'

Shortly afterwards a pamphlet appeared, entitled An Enquiry into the Conduct of Captain Mostyn. It was anonymous, though the author was probably Admiral Vernon. The author criticised the findings of the court, accusing them of having been led and coached by Mostyn's powerful cousin the Earl of Winchilsea, and of whitewashing Mostyn's negligent conduct during the chase. Mostyn's supporters quickly published a response, A Vindication of the Conduct of Captain M-N, attributing blame solely to Hampton Court's tendency to roll in heavy swell. Despite this response, public opinion remained against Mostyn and nearly a year after the verdict he was jeered out of Portsmouth Dockyard by workmen and sailors calling out 'All's well! there's no Frenchman in the way!'

== Continued service ==
Despite these proceedings, Mostyn remained in command of Hampton Court, and joined William Martin's squadron later in 1745. He enjoyed some considerable success against enemy cruisers and privateers, capturing Diane on 4 May 1745, and the 32-gun Lis in December that year.^{[a]} He captured several more privateers over the next few years, Dauphin on 27 January 1746, and the 20-gun Comte de Lowendahl in the Western Channel on 4 March 1747. He was with a squadron when they fell in with a convoy being escorted by Comte Dubois de la Motte on 20 June 1747, and took 48 merchants as prizes. Several more privateers were taken during 1747, Triomphant on 23 June, Grand San Juan on 7 December, and the 20-gun Thétis on 9 December. Hampton Court cruised with Sir Peter Warren's fleet in 1748.

== Politics and high office ==
Mostyn entered politics in 1747, with his election in July that year as Member of Parliament for the Herefordshire constituency of Weobley. He used the position to support the government, and held the seat until his death. He was appointed Comptroller of the Navy on 22 March 1749, having to manage the repair of old ships and the construction of new ones during the peace, when the dockyard workforces were being reduced. He is sometimes credited with the introduction of standardised uniforms for naval officers during his time as Comptroller, though an order in council establishing uniform clothing exists dating from 10 February 1747. Mostyn returned to active service with the outbreak of the French and Indian War, receiving a promotion to rear-admiral on 4 February 1755. He went out to North America in summer that year as second in command of the fleet under Vice-Admiral Edward Boscawen, and spent 1756 as second in command of the western squadron, serving successively under Edward Hawke, Boscawen, and Sir Charles Knowles.

He became one of the junior lords of the Admiralty between April and June 1757, under the brief administration of his cousin, and died shortly afterwards, on 16 September 1757. He was unmarried, and left £60,000 to his nephew, Roger Mostyn.

== Notes ==
a. Lis was taken into the Royal Navy as the 26-gun sixth rate HMS Lys.

== Citations ==
Military offices
Preceded by Richard Haddock	Comptroller of the Navy; 1749–1755	Succeeded by Sir Charles Saunders
Parliament of Great Britain
Preceded by Lieutenant-Colonel The Lord Carpenter; The Viscount Palmerston	Member of Parliament for Weobley; 1747–1757; With: Mansel Powell (1747); Viscount Perceval (1747–1754); John Craster (1754–1757)	Succeeded by John Craster; George Venables-Vernon
