= Digby Dent (Royal Navy officer, born 1713) =

Captain Digby Dent
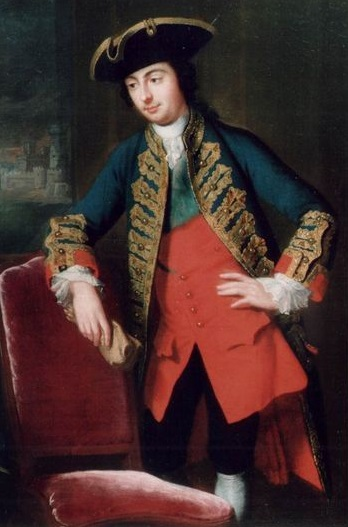
- Commodore Digby Dent by Nathaniel Dance-Holland
- Born: 17 January 1713
- Died: 5 June 1761 (aged 48)
- Military career
- Allegiance: Kingdom of Great Britain
- Branch: Royal Navy
- Rank: Captain
- Commands: HMS Kinsale; HMS Hampton Court; Jamaica Station; HMS Queenborough
- Conflicts: War of Jenkins' Ear; Third Carnatic War

Captain Digby Dent (17 January 1713 – 5 June 1761) was a Royal Navy officer who served as Commander-in-Chief of the Jamaica Station.

== Naval career ==
Born 17 January 1713 and baptised 4 February 1713 at St Nicholas Chiswick Middlesex, the son of Captain Digby Dent and his wife Ursula. Dent joined the Royal Navy on 20 October 1726 and was commissioned as a lieutenant in January 1734. In August 1737 he was given command of the small 8-gunner HMS Drake.

He was promoted to post captain on 9 June 1738 on appointment to the command of the fifth-rate HMS Kinsale. He transferred to the command of the third-rate HMS Hampton Court in 1739 and saw action in operations against Santiago de Cuba during the War of Jenkins' Ear. After several short commands he became captain of HMS Plymouth a 60-gunner which was involved in a large battle with the French fleet on 3 August 1746 near Jamaica which was part of the War of Austrian Succession.

He was appointed a commodore, and became Commander-in-Chief of the Jamaica Station in 1747. In March 1747 he became overall Commander of the British Fleet in the West Indies and oversaw the Battle of Santiago de Cuba. He was court-martialled im 1749 over his choices in the 1741 Battle of Santiago de Cuba but found not guilty.

He was appointed Comptroller of the Navy in 1756.

He died at his house in Dover Street St George Hanover Square on 5 June 1761.

== Family ==
On 28 June 1731, aged 18, Dent, of St George Hanover Square, married Mary Tredway Rule at St Katherine by the Tower by licence. His second marriage took place in September 1750 when he married 17-year-old Sophia Pitt Drake at St Mary's Church in Twickenham Following Dent's death Sophia married Admiral George Pocock who was a long-term friend of her father. His brother Captain Cotton Dent RN was father to Sir Digby Dent.

== Sources ==
- Cundall, Frank (1915). Historic Jamaica. West India Committee.

Military offices
Preceded by Cornelius Mitchell	Commander-in-Chief, Jamaica Station; 1747	Succeeded by Charles Knowles
Preceded by Charles Saunders	Comptroller of the Navy; 1756	Succeeded by George Cockburne
