= HMS Duke (1739) =

- Duke

History

Great Britain
- Name: HMS Duke
- Acquired: 22 June 1739
- Fate: Expended on 14 June 1742

General characteristics
- Class & type: 8-gun fireship
- Tons burthen: 19925/94 bm
- Length: 83 ft 1 in (25.3 m) (overall); 66 ft 8 in (20.3 m) (keel)
- Beam: 23 ft 9.5 in (7.3 m)
- Depth of hold: 11 ft 1 in (3.38 m)
- Complement: 45
- Armament: 8 × 6-pdrs; 6 or 8 × 1/2-pdr swivels

HMS Duke was an 8-gun fireship of the Royal Navy. She was acquired for service in 1739, having previously been a merchant vessel, and served in the War of Jenkins' Ear and the War of the Austrian Succession, being expended in a naval operation in 1742.

== Purchase and Commission ==
Duke was purchased from a Mr Charles Wyndham on 22 June 1739, for the sum of £697.8.7d paid for the hull and £106.18.8¼d for the stores. She was not given a typical fireship name, and so was probably named Duke while in civilian service, and the name was retained while in the Navy. Also in service at this time was a 90-gun second rate ship named HMS Duke, the previous HMS Vanguard launched in 1678. The fireship Duke was fitted out at Woolwich Dockyard between 7 July and 12 August 1739, for a further sum of £1,832.9.11d, and was commissioned in June that year under Commander Savage Mostyn.

== Service ==
Duke was assigned to operate with Nicholas Haddock's fleet in the Mediterranean. In March 1740 she came under Commander William Russell, serving with Chaloner Ogle's squadron. Her last commander, from 1742, was Commander Smith Callis. Duke was expended at St Tropez on 14 June 1742 in an operation that saw the successful destruction of five Spanish galleasses. The five Spanish vessels had entered the port, and Duke was sent in to attempt to destroy them, covered by HMS Kingston, HMS Oxford, and HMS Spence. It was recorded that Duke "had the good fortune to destroy so many at the expense of one fireship; a vessel perhaps the best expended that ever was burnt, considering the importance of these galleys to the enemy, and the difficulty of getting more soon enough for their purpose at so critical a juncture, when they stood most in need of them: But, indeed, the Spaniards indiscreetly mooring alongside of one another, contributed to the destruction of them in so easy a manner; though this observation is not made to diminish so glorious and well-executed a piece of service, which is worthy of the greatest applause...'
