= Charles Saunders (Royal Navy officer) =

Royal Navy officer and politician (1715–1775)

Admiral Sir Charles Saunders KB
- Portrait by Sir Joshua Reynolds, c. 1760
- Born: 1715; London, England
- Died: 7 December 1775 (aged 59–60); London, England
- Burial place: Westminster Abbey
- Military career
- Allegiance: Great Britain
- Branch: Royal Navy
- Service years: 1727–1766
- Rank: Admiral of the Blue
- Commands: HMS Plymouth; HMS Sapphire; HMS Dunkirk; HMS Gloucester; HMS Yarmouth; HMS Tiger; Mediterranean Fleet; Western Squadron
- Conflicts: War of the Austrian Succession; Second Battle of Cape Finisterre; Seven Years' War; Battle of the Plains of Abraham
- Awards: Knight of the Order of the Bath

Admiral of the Blue Sir Charles Saunders, KB (c. 1715 – 7 December 1775) was a Royal Navy officer and politician. He commanded the fourth-rate HMS Gloucester and at the Second Battle of Cape Finisterre in October 1747 during the War of the Austrian Succession. After serving as Commander-in-Chief, Mediterranean Fleet, he was appointed Commander-in-Chief, English Channel, in charge of the Western Squadron between October 1758 and May 1759.

Saunders took command of the fleet tasked with carrying a British army under Major-general James Wolfe to Quebec in January 1759 and consolidated the dead general's victory after the Battle of the Plains of Abraham in September 1759 by devoting great energy to keeping the British Army, now under the command of Colonel George Townshend, well supplied during the Seven Years' War. He later became Senior Naval Lord and then First Lord of the Admiralty.

== Early career ==
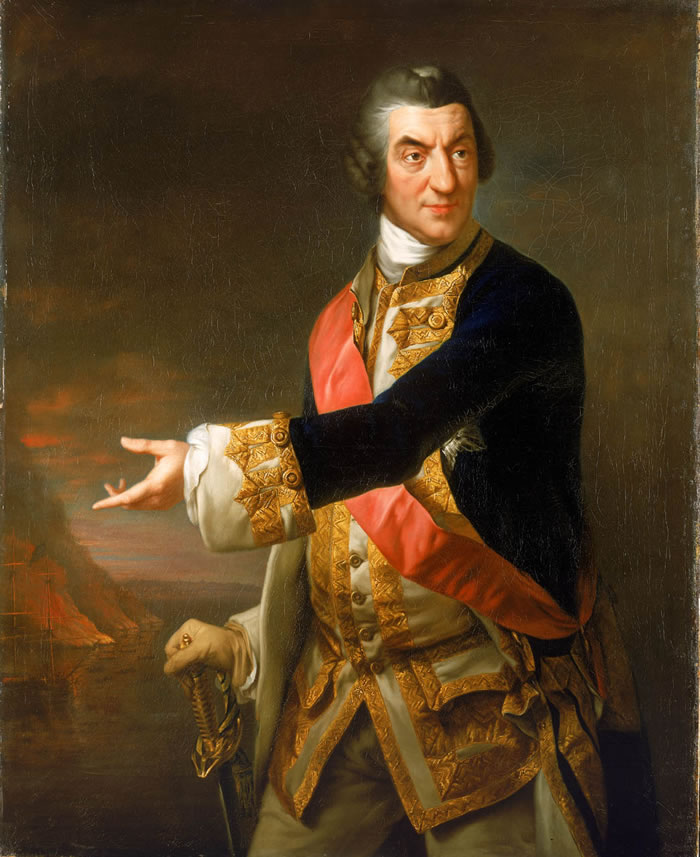
1772–1773 portrait of Saunders by Richard Brompton

Born the son of James Saunders of Bridgwater, Somerset, Saunders joined the Royal Navy in October 1727. He initially served as a midshipman on the sixth-rate HMS Seahorse and then transferred to the fourth-rate HMS Hector in March 1731. Promoted to lieutenant on 8 November 1734, he was posted to the fourth-rate HMS Exeter in July 1738 and then transferred to the third-rate HMS Norfolk in June 1739, to the fourth-rate HMS Sunderland in August 1739 and to the fourth-rate HMS Centurion in November 1742.

Promoted to post-captain in June 1743 (with an effective date of 26 September 1741), Saunders was given command of the fourth-rate HMS Plymouth in December 1743, the fifth-rate HMS Sapphire in December 1744 and the fourth-rate HMS Dunkirk in 1745. He went on to take command of the fourth-rate HMS Gloucester in 1747 and led her in action at the Second Battle of Cape Finisterre in October 1747 during the War of the Austrian Succession. After that he became captain of the third-rate HMS Yarmouth later that year and of the fourth-rate HMS Tiger in 1749.

Saunders was appointed Commodore in charge of the squadron at Newfoundland with his broad pennant in the fifth-rate HMS Penzance in February 1752. He went on to be treasurer of Greenwich Hospital in February 1754 and Comptroller of the Navy in December 1755. Saunders was Member of Parliament for Plymouth from 1750 to 1754 and then represented the Yorkshire borough of Hedon from 1754 until his death.

== Seven Years' War ==
Promoted to Rear-Admiral of the Blue on 7 January 1756, Saunders was sent to Gibraltar as second-in-command of the Mediterranean Fleet. In January 1757 he was promoted to Commander-in-Chief, Mediterranean Fleet, remaining in that post until May 1757. On 13 July 1758, Saunders was promoted to Rear-Admiral of the White, and in October he was appointed Commander-in-Chief, English Channel, holding the post until May 1759. He took command of the fleet tasked with carrying a British army under Major-general James Wolfe to Quebec in January 1759 and, having been promoted to Vice-Admiral of the Blue on 14 February 1759, he consolidated the dead general's victory after the Battle of the Plains of Abraham in September 1759 by devoting great energy to keeping the British Army, now under the command of Colonel George Towshend, well supplied. Saunders and Towshend were joint signatories for Britain after the French garrison capitulated.

In April 1760 he resumed his role as Commander-in-Chief, Mediterranean Fleet, and blockaded Cádiz preventing the French and Spanish fleets from sailing. He was installed as Knight of the Bath in May 1761 and, in the action of 31 May 1762, ships of his fleet chased down and captured the Spanish treasure ship Hermione off Cape St Mary. Saunders acquired estates at Gunton in Suffolk and at Fishley in Norfolk in 1762, and on 21 October of that year he was promoted to Vice-Admiral of the White.

== Later career ==
French Firerafts Attacking the British Fleet off Quebec by Samuel Scott

Saunders joined the Board of Admiralty as Senior Naval Lord in the first Rockingham ministry in July 1765 and was advanced to First Lord of the Admiralty in the Chatham ministry in September 1766; after a disagreement with Lord Chatham, he stood down from the Admiralty Board in December 1766. Promoted to Admiral of the Blue on 18 October 1770, he died at his home at Spring Gardens in London on 7 December 1775 and was buried in Westminster Abbey.

== Family ==
Saunders married a Miss Buck, the daughter of a London banker, in September 1751.

== Legacy ==
Cape Saunders, on the Otago coast of New Zealand, was named in his honour by Captain James Cook, who had served under Saunders in Canada.

== Sources ==
- Kirby, John (1839). A topographical and historical description of the county of Suffolk. Longman & Co.
- Rodger, N. A. M. (1979). The Admiralty. Offices of State. Lavenham: T. Dalton Ltd. ISBN 0-900963-94-8.
- Salmon, Edward (1914). Life of Admiral Sir Charles Saunders, K.B. London: Pitman.

Military offices
Preceded by Savage Mostyn	Comptroller of the Navy; 1755–1756	Succeeded by Digby Dent
Preceded by Earl Howe	Senior Naval Lord; 1765–1766	Succeeded by Augustus Keppel
Parliament of Great Britain
Preceded by Arthur Stert; Vere Beauclerk	Member of Parliament for Plymouth; 1750–1754; With: Arthur Stert	Succeeded by The Viscount Barrington; Samuel Dicker
Preceded by Luke Robinson; John Savile	Member of Parliament for Hedon; 1754–1775; With: Peter Denis 1754–1768; Beilby Thompson 1768–1775	Succeeded by Beilby Thompson; Lewis Watson
Political offices
Preceded by The Earl of Egmont	First Lord of the Admiralty; 1766	Succeeded by Sir Edward Hawke
