= Action of 14 June 1742 =

1742 naval battle

- Part of the War of the Austrian Succession & the War of Jenkins' Ear
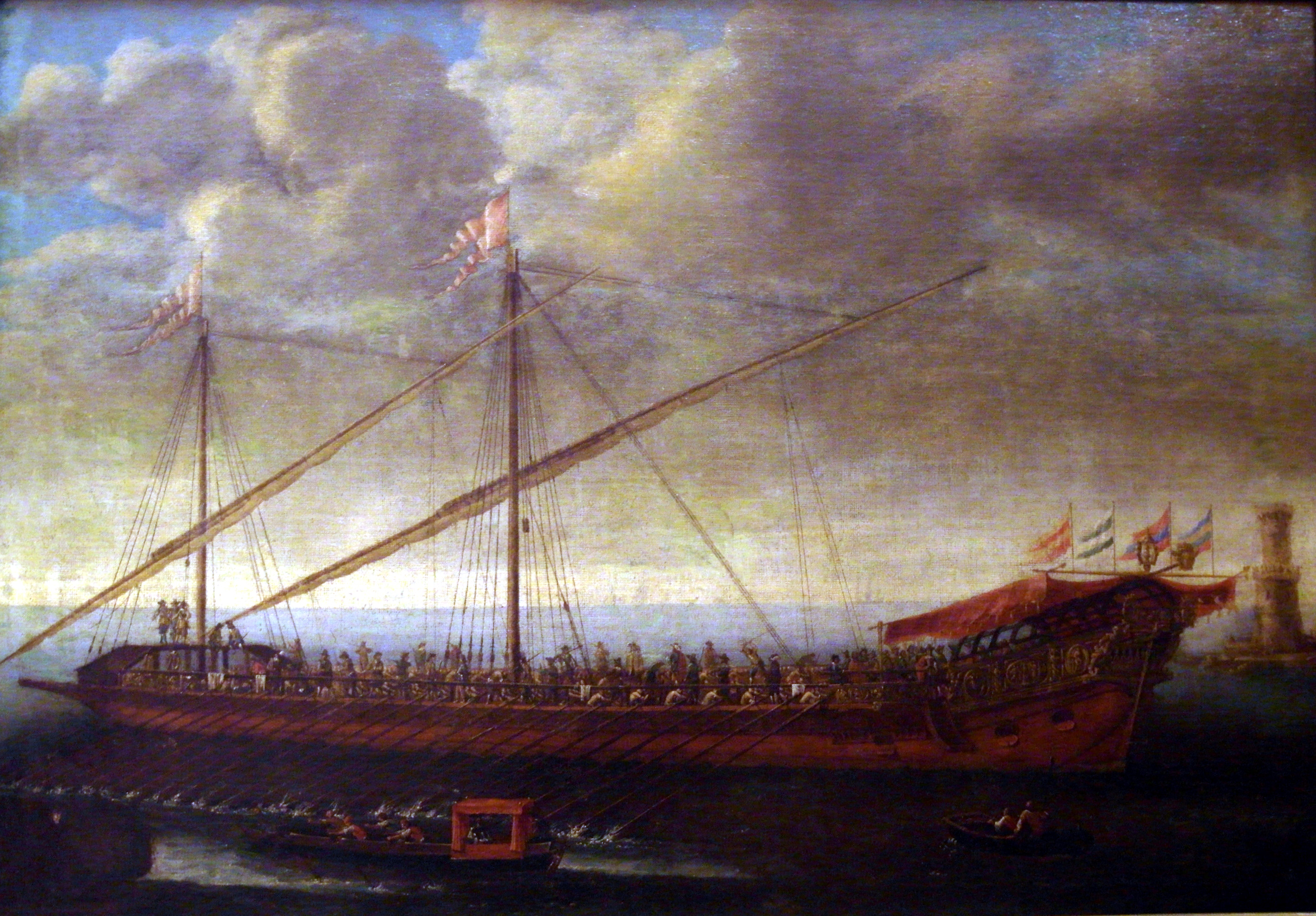
- Spanish galley of the late reign of Charles II. Painting by Manuel de Castro.
Date	14 June 1742
Location	Saint Tropez, France 43.273296°N 6.639621°E
Result	British victory

Belligerents
Spain	(Kingdom of Great Britain) Britain

Commanders and leaders
Donato Domas	Richard Norris

Strength
5 Royal galleys	2 fourth-rates 1 sloop 1 fireship

Casualties and losses
5 Royal galleys burned	Minor

The action of 14 June 1742 was a minor naval battle of the War of the Austrian Succession in which a small British squadron under Captain Richard Norris burned 5 Spanish royal galleys at the French port of Saint Tropez. Norris had surprised the galleys near Sainte-Marguerite and had chased and driven them into the French port. The British captain, in spite of alleged French neutrality, followed the Spanish vessels into the port and destroyed them at slight cost.

== Action ==
By 1742, the Commander-in-Chief of the Royal Navy in the Mediterranean, Admiral Nicholas Haddock, had failed to force the Spanish fleet into an action, and worn out with years and disappointments, resigned his command to Rear Admiral Richard Lestock. It was Vice Admiral Thomas Mathews, with a reinforcement of seven ships of the line, who replaced him as Commander-in-Chief. Matthews based the British fleet at the Piedmontese port of Villefranche-sur-Mer and at the Hyères islands and dispatched several squadrons to cruise in search of Spanish vessels.

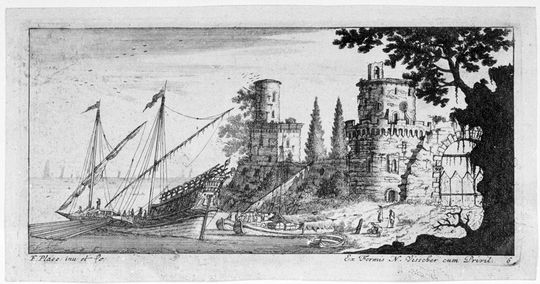
Galley lying near a castle, by Francis Place

On 13 June 1742, the British squadron cruising off Cape Garoupe, under Captain Richard Norris of the 60-gun HMS Kingston sighted 5 Spanish galleys with guns and military stores for the Spanish army in Italy leaving the anchorage at Sainte-Marguerite. This vessels were the Patrona, the San Felipe, the Soledad, the Santa Teresa and the San Genaro and were commanded by General Don Donato Domas. Norris, who had with him, besides his own fourth-rate ship of the line, the 50-gun HMS Oxford, the sloop Spence and the fireship Duke, chased the galleys and drove them into the French port of Saint Tropez.

Norris, arriving off the port, sent a message requesting the governor of Saint Tropez that the Spanish galleys might be denied shelter and sent to the sea. The French governor refused and at the evening Norris prepared to attack. His two ships of the line sailed up to the mole and anchored close to it. At 1 am the fireship, under Captain Callis, was dispatched to burn the galleys together with all the boats of the squadron under the cover of Oxford and Kingston. Just as the fireship entered the mole, the galleys opened fire. The five took fire and burned along with the fireship. The Spanish sailors took to the water and escaped by swimming to shore. Those who survived joined the Spanish fleet under Admiral Juan José Navarro at Toulon.

== Aftermath ==
The French authorities filed a complaint for the breaking of his neutrality. In fact, they were deliberately assisting the Spanish by giving them the use and shelter of their ports. According to the British historian Edward Cust, "the French flag had so often been allowed to save the Spanish ships that it was thought right to deprive it of all pretext of neutrality". Captain Callis of the Duke was awarded with a golden medal by the King George II. He also was posted to HMS Assistance. Donato Domas and the captains of the Spanish galleys were court-martialled and acquitted as it was found that they had fulfilled his duty.
