= Digby Dent (Royal Navy officer, born 1682) =

Captain Digby Dent
- Born: 1682; Westminster London
- Died: 1737 (aged 54–55); Jamaica
- Military career
- Allegiance: Kingdom of Great Britain
- Branch: Royal Navy
- Rank: Captain
- Commands: HMS Lynn; HMS Ruby; HMS Launceston; HMS Lennox; HMS Captain; HMS Dunkirk; Jamaica Station

Captain Digby Dent (1682–1737) was a Royal Navy officer who served as Commander-in-Chief of the Jamaica Station.

== Naval career ==
Dent was promoted to post captain in October 1715 on appointment to the command of the fifth-rate HMS Lynn. He transferred to the command of the fourth-rate HMS Mermaid in 1720, of the fifth-rate HMS Launceston in 1722 and of the third-rate HMS Lennox in 1726. He went on to take the command of the third-rate HMS Captain in 1731 and of the fourth-rate HMS Dunkirk in 1735.

Dent served briefly as Commander-in-Chief of the Jamaica Station, with his broad pennant in the second-rate HMS Shrewsbury, from 1736 until his death in 1737.

== Family ==
His son Digby Dent (c1713–1761) was also a Royal Navy officer. and his Grandson (via son Royal Navy Capt.Cotton Dent 1715–1761), also Digby Dent (1739–1817), was a Royal Naval Officer who was knighted in 1778.

== Sources ==
- Cundall, Frank (1915). Historic Jamaica. West India Committee.

Military offices
Preceded by Sir Chaloner Ogle	Commander-in-Chief, Jamaica Station; 1736–1737	Succeeded by Sir Chaloner Ogle
