= David Polhill =

English landowner and Whig politician

David Polhill (1674 – 15 January 1754), of Chipstead, Kent, was an English landowner and Whig politician who sat in the House of Commons at various times between 1710 and 1754. He was one of the signatories of the Kentish petition in 1701.

== Early life ==
Polhill was the second son of Thomas Polhill of Otford, Kent and his wife Elizabeth Ireton, daughter of Henry Ireton, and granddaughter of Oliver Cromwell. Polhill's elder brother died, leaving him in possession of his father's inheritance. In December 1692, he was given a licence to travel to Holland which became the start of an extended Grand Tour. He visited Hanover, Brunswick, Zell, Austria, Geneva and Italy where he was at Padua University in 1694. He returned to England in the autumn of 1696.

== Career ==
Polhill was added to the Kentish lieutenancy on 30 July 1697, and also became a Freeman of Dover in 1697. He was appointed to the Commission of the Peace (J.P) in March 1699 and was steward of the honour of Otford from 1700 to 1705. In 1701 he became Freeman of Sandwich when he stood there for Parliament. He became notable as one of the contributors to the Kentish Petition of 1701, which urged unanimity on the House of Commons and the swift vote of supplies for the army. The others were Thomas Meredith and William Colepeper, Justinian Champneys, and William Hamilton the third son of James Hamilton. He was ordered into custody by the Commons on 8 May 1701 for presenting the petition. On his release, he lost his place on the county bench and his lieutenancy. In 1705 he was freeman of the Company of Free Fishermen of Thames and Medway. After Lord Rockingham became lord lieutenant of Kent in 1705, Polhill was reappointed a deputy lieutenant, and restored to the bench in March 1706.

Polhill was returned unopposed as Member of Parliament for Kent at a by election on 11 January 1710 but had little time in Parliament to do other than vote for the impeachment of Dr Sacheverell. He became a Freeman of Rochester in 1710. He was defeated at the 1710 British general election and did not stand at the 1713 British general election. He was appointed High Sheriff of Kent for the year 1714 to 1715.

Polhill was appointed warden of Rochester Bridge in 1716 and keeper of Walmer Castle in 1718. He was elected MP for Bramber at a by-election on 16 February 1723. At the 1727 British general election, he switched to Rochester, where he was brought in by the Administration as MP. He was returned again in a contest at the 1734 British general election but was defeated in 1741. He regained the seat again at a by-election 22 February 1743 and was returned again at the 1747 British general election. He was also keeper of the records in the Tower of London from 1731 until his death.

== Later life and legacy ==
Polhill lived at Chipstead but also had a house at Otford which he attempted to rebuild. He died on 15 January 1754, aged 79 and is commemorated by a carved memorial in Otford Church by Sir Henry Cheere, 1st Baronet.

Polhill married Elizabeth Trevor, daughter of Thomas Trevor of Glynde, Sussex on 3 September 1702. She died in 1708 and he married as his second wife, on 20 August 1713, Gertrude Holles, daughter of Thomas Pelham, 1st Baron Pelham and sister of the 1st Duke of Newcastle. Gertrude died in 1714 and he married as his third wife, Elizabeth Borret, daughter of John Borret of Shoreham on 28 July 1719. There were no children from his first two marriages, and he had four sons and one daughter by his last marriage, of whom Charles, who succeeded to his estates, and Elizabeth, survived him.

Parliament of Great Britain
Preceded by Sir Thomas Palmer, Bt; Sir Stephen Lennard, Bt	Member of Parliament for Kent; January–October 1710; With: Sir Thomas Palmer, Bt	Succeeded by Sir Cholmeley Dering, Bt; Percival Hart
Preceded by Sir Richard Gough; William Charles van Huls	Member of Parliament for Bramber; 1723–1727; With: Sir Richard Gough	Succeeded by Sir Richard Gough; Joseph Danvers
Preceded by Sir Thomas Colby, Bt; Sir John Jennings	Member of Parliament for Rochester; 1727–1741; With: Sir John Jennings; Nicholas Haddock	Succeeded by Edward Vernon; Nicholas Haddock
Preceded by Edward Vernon; Nicholas Haddock	Member of Parliament for Rochester; 1743–1754; With: Nicholas Haddock; Sir Chaloner Ogle; Hon. John Byng	Succeeded by Hon. John Byng; Nicholas Haddock
