= Chaloner Ogle =

Royal Navy officer and politician (1681–1750)

Admiral of the Fleet Sir Chaloner Ogle KB
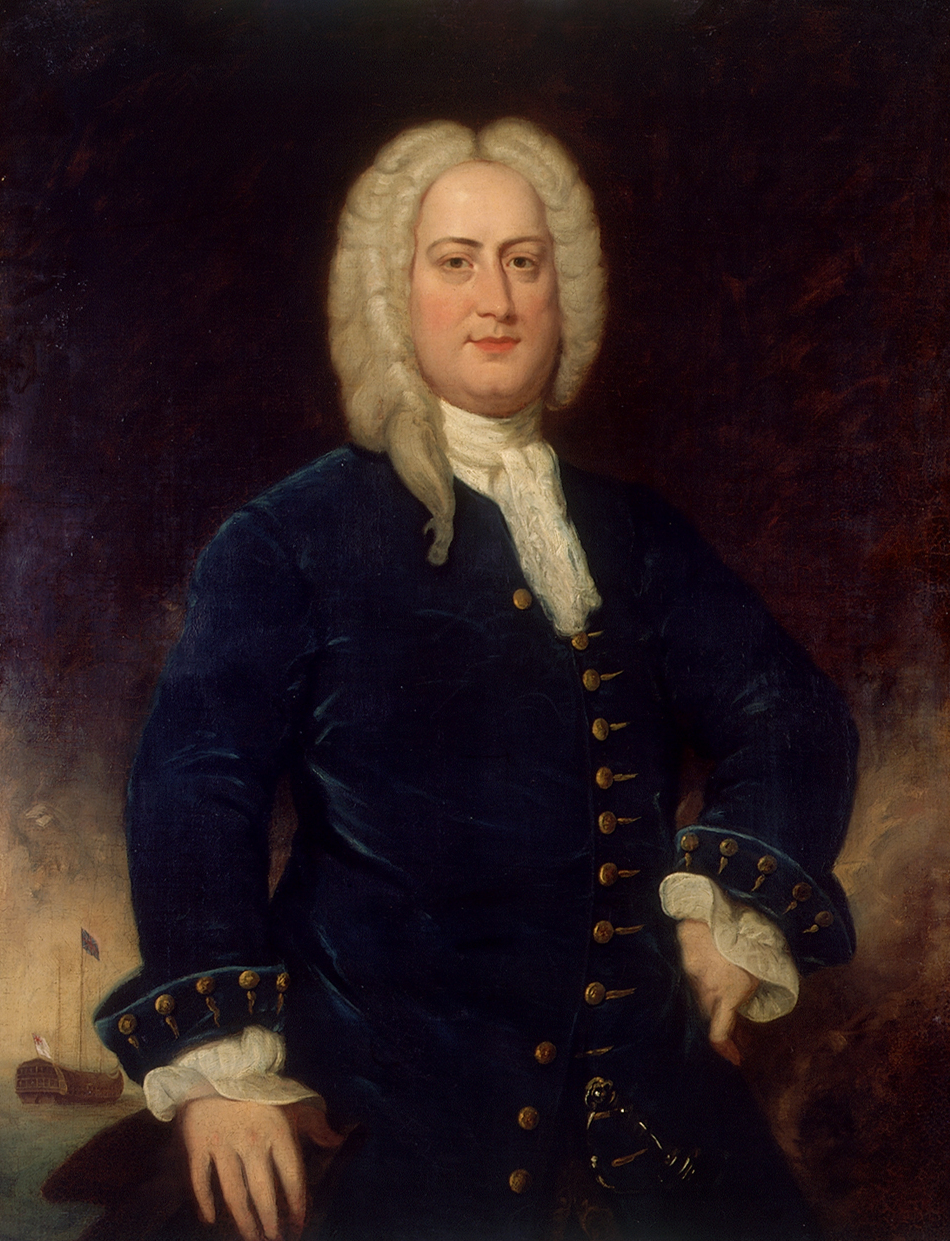
- 1745–1747 portrait
- Born: 1681
- Died: 11 April 1750 (aged 68–69); London
- Burial place: St Mary's, Twickenham
- Military career
- Allegiance: England; Great Britain
- Branch: Royal Navy
- Service years: 1697–1750
- Rank: Admiral of the Fleet
- Commands: HMS San Antonio; HMS Deal Castle; HMS Queenborough; HMS Tartar; HMS Plymouth; HMS Worcester; HMS Swallow; HMS Burford; HMS Edinburgh; Jamaica Station; The Nore
- Conflicts: Nine Years' War; War of the Spanish Succession; Battle of Cape Lopez; War of Jenkins' Ear; Battle of Cartagena de Indias
- Awards: Knight Companion of the Order of the Bath

Admiral of the Fleet Sir Chaloner Ogle KB (1681 – 11 April 1750) was a Royal Navy officer and politician who represented Rochester in the House of Commons of Great Britain from 1746 to 1750. After serving as a junior officer during the Nine Years' War, a ship he was commanding was captured by three French ships off Ostend in July 1706 in an action during the War of the Spanish Succession.

Ogle was given command of the fourth-rate HMS Swallow and saw action against the pirate fleet of Bartholomew Roberts in the Battle of Cape Lopez in February 1722. The action was to prove a turning point in the war against the pirates and many consider the death of Roberts to mark the end of the Golden Age of Piracy.

In December 1741, Ogle was despatched with a fleet of some 30 ships to support Vice-Admiral of the White Edward Vernon in the Battle of Cartagena de Indias during the War of Jenkins' Ear. Following the British defeat in the battle, Ogle went on to be Commander-in-Chief, The Nore.

== Early career ==
Born to John Ogle, a Newcastle barrister, and Mary (née Braithwaite) Ogle, Chaloner Ogle came from the Kirkley Hall branch of the prominent Northumbrian Ogle family of Northumberland. He joined the Royal Navy as a volunteer in July 1697. Ogle served in the third-rate HMS Yarmouth and then the third-rate HMS Restoration in Autumn 1697 during the Nine Years' War and then served in the fourth-rate HMS Worcester followed by the third-rate HMS Suffolk in 1698. Promoted to lieutenant on 29 April 1702, he joined the third-rate HMS Royal Oak later that month.

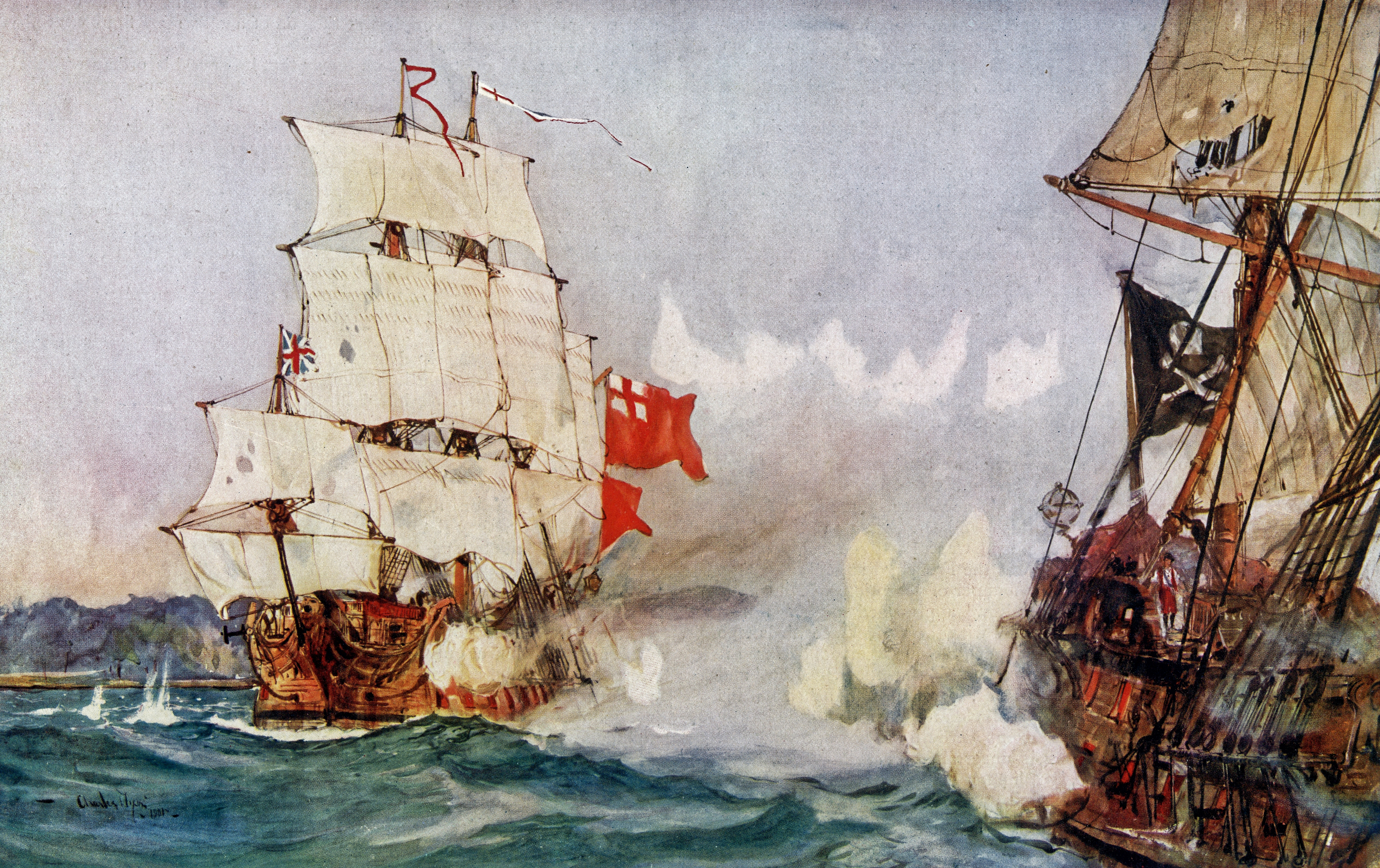
HMS Swallow (left) under Ogle at the Battle of Cape Lopez

Promoted to master and commander on 24 November 1703, Ogle was given command of the sloop-of-war HMS San Antonio which had been captured from William Kidd. He transferred to the command of sixth-rate HMS Deal Castle in April 1705; his ship was captured by three French ships off Ostend in July 1706 in an action during the War of the Spanish Succession but he was acquitted at the subsequent court-martial and then given command of the sixth-rate HMS Queenborough. Promoted to captain on 14 March 1708, Ogle was given command of the fifth-rate HMS Tartar in the Mediterranean where he took several prizes. He then transferred to the fourth-rate HMS Plymouth and then to the fourth-rate HMS Worcester both in the Baltic Sea.

Ogle was given command of the fourth-rate HMS Swallow in March 1719 and saw action against the Welsh pirate Bartholomew Roberts in the Battle of Cape Lopez on 10 February 1722. Ogle spotted three of Roberts' ships at anchor on 5 February and initially pretended to flee: the pirate ship Ranger under James Skyrme gave pursuit and was captured by Swallow. Ogle returned and went after Roberts' flagship Royal Fortune, which was anchored at Cape Lopez, on 10 February: Roberts tried to escape but Royal Fortune received a broadside from HMS Swallow as she passed and Roberts was killed in the action. Ogle was appointed a Knight Companion of the Order of the Bath in April 1723, the only British naval officer to be honoured specifically for his actions against pirates. The action was to prove a turning point in the war against the pirates and many consider the death of Roberts to mark the end of the Golden Age of Piracy.

Ogle was given command of the third-rate HMS Burford in the Channel Fleet in 1729 and of third-rate HMS Edinburgh in the Mediterranean in 1732. Promoted to commodore later that year he became commander-in-chief of the Jamaica Station, flying his broad pennant in the fourth-rate HMS Kingston.

== Senior command ==
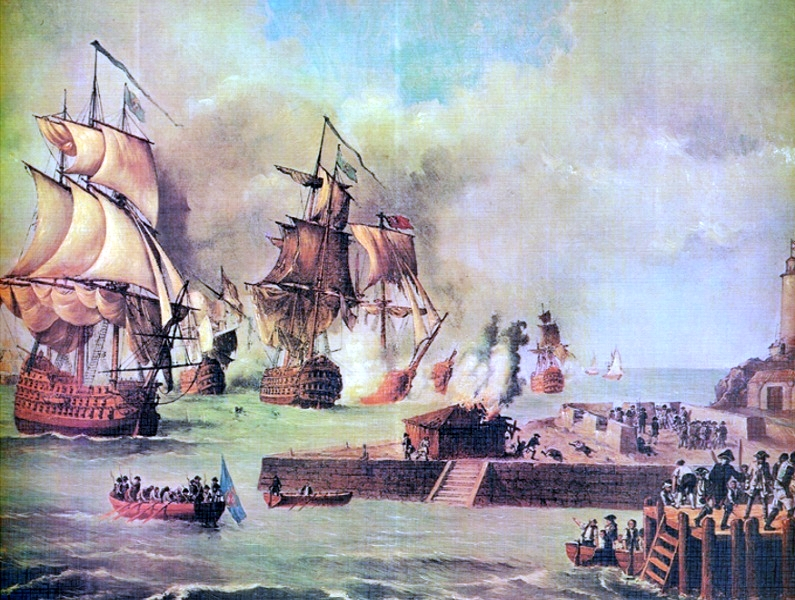
The Battle of Cartagena de Indias, at which Ogle led a naval attack on Spanish forts

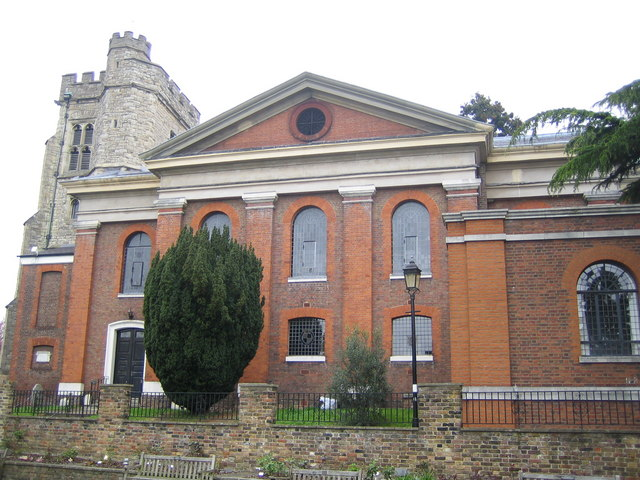
St Mary's, Twickenham, where Ogle was buried

Promoted to Rear-Admiral of the Blue on 11 July 1739, Ogle became second-in-command in the Mediterranean under Rear-Admiral of the Red Nicholas Haddock, with his flag in the fourth-rate HMS Augusta later that year, but then transferred to become third-in-command in the Channel under Admiral of the Fleet Sir John Norris, still with his flag in HMS Augusta, in 1740. Ogle was promoted again to Rear-Admiral of the Red on 12 March 1741.

In December 1741, Ogle was despatched with a fleet of some 30 ships to support Vice-Admiral of the White Edward Vernon in his engagement with Spanish naval forces under Blas de Lezo off the coast of Colombia during the War of Jenkins' Ear. Ogle arrived in April 1742 and, after a week of bombardment of the City of Cartagena, the British made preparations to land near an access channel, Boca Chica, with 300 grenadiers. The Spanish defenders of two small, nearby forts, San Iago and San Philip, were driven off by a three ships of the fleet under Ogle but the British naval force suffered some 120 casualties with the third-rate HMS Shrewsbury alone losing 100 killed and wounded as well as taking serious damage from cannon fire from Fort San Luis. Although the grenadiers landed, the subsequent attack on Fort San Lazaro was a disaster for the attackers, who were eventually forced to withdraw after losing thousands of men, mostly to tropical diseases such as yellow fever. In the recriminations after the battle Ogle was accused of an assault upon Edward Trelawny, governor of Jamaica in August 1742; he was tried in court but no judgement was given. Vernon was recalled and Ogle became Commander-in-Chief of the Jamaica Station again.

Promoted to Vice-Admiral of the Blue on 9 August 1743 and agin to Vice-Admiral of the White on 7 December Ogle presided at the courts-martial of the captains accused of cowardice at the Battle of Toulon in late February 1744. Promoted to Admiral of the Blue on 23 June 1744, he became Commander-in-Chief, The Nore in September 1745. He was elected Member of Parliament for Rochester in November 1746 and promoted to Admiral of the White on 15 July 1747 and again to Admiral of the Fleet on 1 July 1749. After his retirement, he lived at Gifford Lodge in Twickenham. He died in London on 11 April 1750 and was buried at St Mary's, Twickenham. The monument was sculpted by John Michael Rysbrack.

== Family ==
In October 1714, Ogle married Henrietta Isaacson. After the death of his first wife, he married Jane Isabella Ogle (a cousin) in October 1737; there were no children from either marriage.

== Sources ==
- Cawthorne, Nigel (2005). Pirates: an Illustrated History. Capella. ISBN 1-84193-520-4.
- Cordingly, David (1999). Life Among the Pirates: the Romance and the Reality. Abacus. ISBN 0-349-11314-9.
- Coxe, William (1815). Memoirs of the kings of Spain of the House of Bourbon. Vol. 3. London.
- Cundall, Frank (1915). Historic Jamaica. West India Committee.
- Dodds, Madeleine Hope (1929). A History of Northumberland. Vol. XII. The Northumberland County History Committee.
- Heathcote, Tony (2002). The British Admirals of the Fleet 1734–1995. Pen & Sword. ISBN 0-85052-835-6.
- Smollett, Tobias; Roscoe, Thomas (1844). The miscellaneous works of Tobias Smollett. London.

Military offices
Preceded by Richard Lestock	Commander-in-Chief, Jamaica Station; 1732–1736	Succeeded by Digby Dent
Preceded by Digby Dent	Commander-in-Chief, Jamaica Station; 1737–1739	Succeeded by Edward Vernon
Preceded by Edward Vernon	Commander-in-Chief, Jamaica Station; 1742–1744	Succeeded by Thomas Davers
Parliament of Great Britain
Preceded by Nicholas Haddock; David Polhill	Member of Parliament for Rochester; 1746–1750; With: David Polhill	Succeeded by John Byng; David Polhill
Military offices
Preceded by Sir John Norris	Admiral of the Fleet; 1749–1751	Succeeded by Sir James Steuart
