= Richard Brompton =

British artist

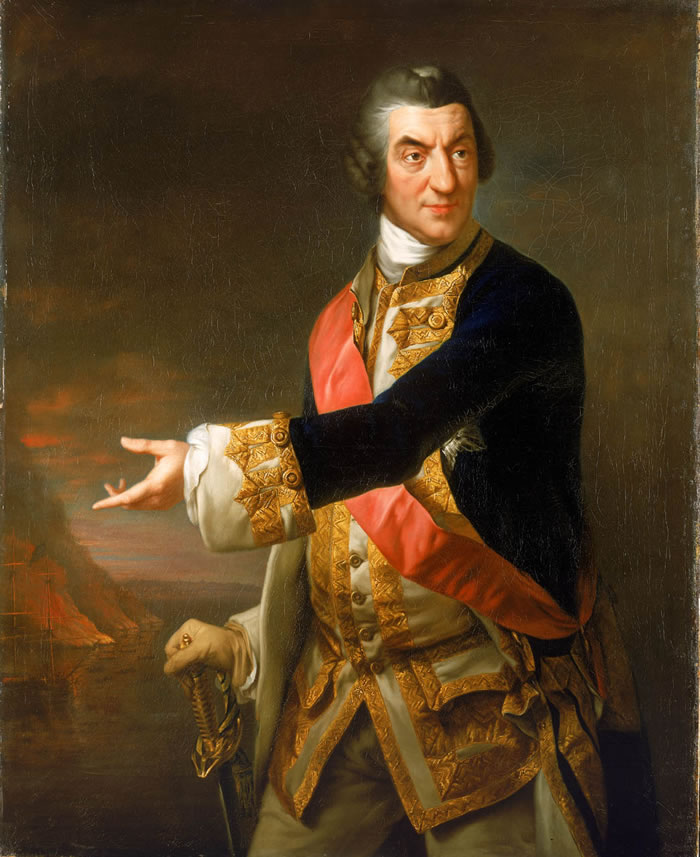
Charles Saunders, painted in 1772/1773. Now in the National Maritime Museum in Greenwich.

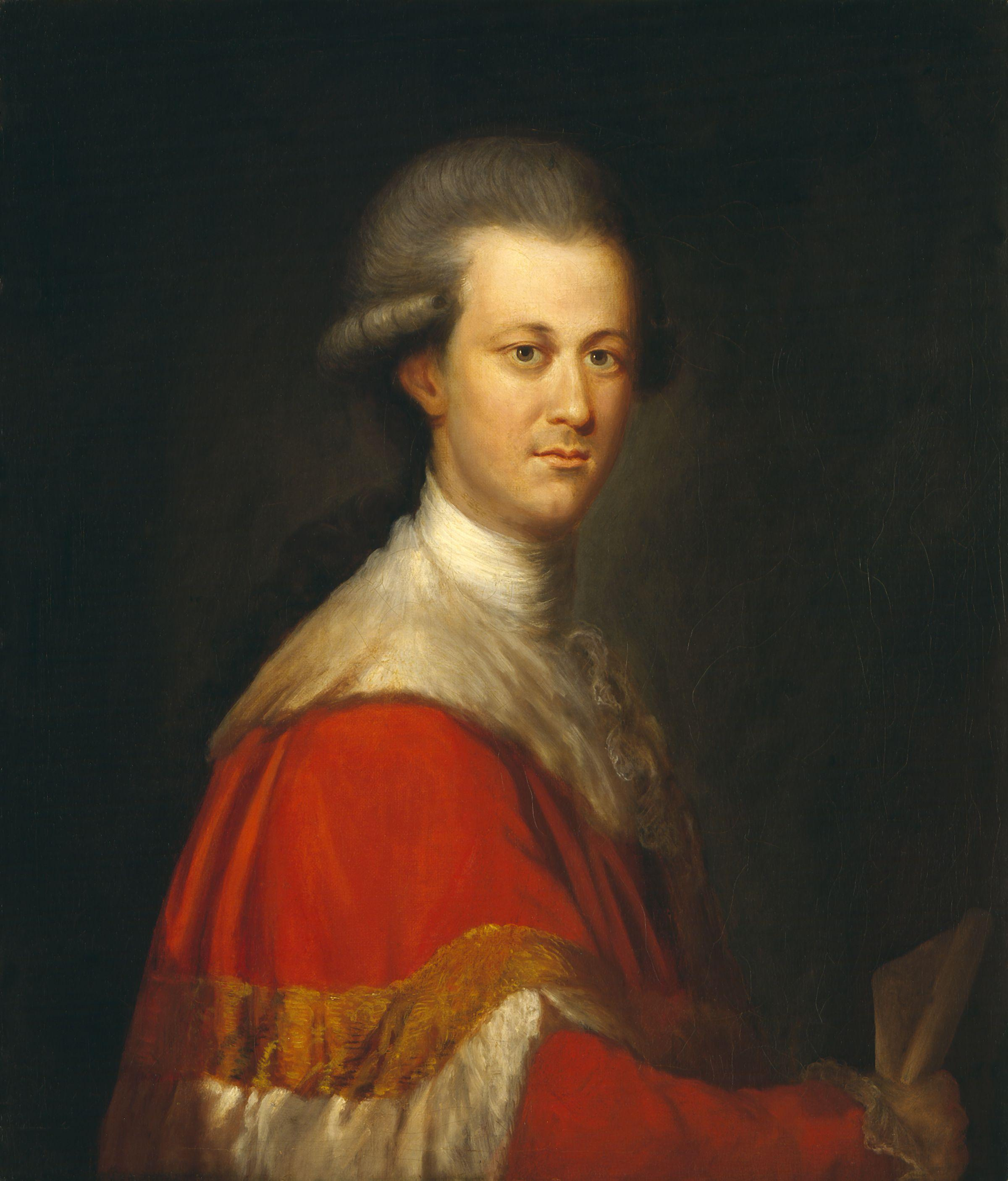
Portrait of Thomas Lyttelton, 2nd Baron Lyttelton, ca. 1775. Now at the National Portrait Gallery in London.

Richard Brompton (1734-1783) was an English portrait painter.

== Life ==
Richard Brompton was born in London and baptised at St Giles in the Fields, Holborn in July 1734, the son of John Brompton and his wife Amy (née Greer).

Richard trained as a painter, first as a pupil in the studio of Benjamin Wilson in London. In 1757, he went to Italy, and resided for some time at Rome, where he received further instruction from Anton Raphael Mengs while living and working in his studio. There his work acquired European polish and attracted the attention of notable British travellers, including John Fitzpatrick, 2nd Earl of Upper Ossory and Henry Temple, 2nd Viscount Palmerston.

In Rome, he also met Charles Compton, 7th Earl of Northampton, who became his patron and protector. He accompanied that nobleman to Venice, when he was appointed ambassador to the republic, and who introduced him there to Prince Edward, Duke of York and Albany (1739-1767), a younger brother of George III. At Venice, he painted a picture, representing a conversation piece, in which he introduced the portraits of the Duke of York and several other English gentlemen then on their travels. The picture was exhibited at the rooms in Spring Gardens in 1763.

Brompton is said to have returned to London around the time that that picture was exhibited. He was elected accademico di merito at the Accademia di S. Luca in Rome in November 1765, but shortly afterwards is certainly recorded as back in London. He lived in George Street, Hanover Square, and later in Broad Street in the City.

He practised as a portrait painter in Britain for some years, exhibiting regularly after 1767 with the Society of Artists, whose President he became, and at the Royal Academy. Not receiving the encouragement and rewards he expected, while engaging in an extravagant life style, he accumulated debts in excess of £600, and was brought before the Court of King's Bench, in which cases of bankruptcy were heard, and confined in the debtor's prison of the same name in 1779.

He was rescued by Catherine the Great, Empress of Russia, at whose request he went to St. Petersburg. He was appointed portrait painter to the Empress in July 1780. During this time he was patronized by the empress's favorite, Grigory Potemkin. His work was well received and brought him further employment. However, he died in that city in January 1783, possibly as a result of the lifestyle he adopted, and once more heavily in debt.

== Family ==
Richard Brompton married Ann Yalden (1757-1815) in Salisbury Cathedral in December 1776. Ann had been born in about December 1757 and was baptised in Ovington in Hampshire. After Richard’s death, Ann covered most of his debts in Russia with the help of generous friends, and then married a wealthy English merchant and banker, James Hill (1755-1825), in May 1783 in the English Church in St. Petersburg. They had one child, James Haydock Hill, born in St. Petersburg in 1785, and later returned to England. Ann Hill died in Walthamstow in June 1815.

The Bromptons’ daughter, Frances Percy Brompton (1778 - 1850), who was baptised in December 1778 at St. Georges in Southwark. married Rev. London King Pitt in October 1798 in the English Church in St. Petersburg.

Brompton and his wife had three more children while living in Russia. Two daughters, born in 1781 and 1782, both died in infancy. A son, Alexander Constantine Brompton, born in 1780, survived him and was commissioned in the Royal Navy in 1804.

== Oeuvre ==
Much of his work is now in public collections. Some were subsequently copied by other painters or rendered as mezzotints and engravings by various artists. Among the people whose portraits Brompton painted were:

- Prince Edward, Duke of York and his friends in Venice. Now in the Royal Collection.
- George, Prince of Wales in the Robes of the Garter, painted in 1772. mezzotinted by John Saunders.
- Prince Frederick, Duke of York and Albany, in the Robes of the Bath. mezzotinted by John Saunders.
- Friedrich der Grosse, i.e. Frederick the Great, ruler of Prussia from 1740 to 1786. painted in about 1770
- William Pitt, 1st Earl of Chatham, painted in about 1772.
- Admiral Charles Saunders, painted in 1772/1773. National Maritime Museum
- Thomas Lyttelton, 2nd Baron Lyttelton. National Portrait gallery
- Ralph Bigland (1712-1784), Somerset Herald at the College of Arms.
- Frederick William Blomberg (1761-1847), an ‘adopted son’ of King George III.
- The Family of Henry Dawkins of Standlynch House, Wiltshire
- Mr. Dubuc, age 18, painted in 1771
- Miss Sophia Finch, painted as a Vestal Virgin in 1779.
- Charles Graeme, painted in about 1769
- Susannah, Lady Isham (d.1823), wife of the 7th Baronet Isham.
- Robert Mylne (1733-1811), an architect, engineer and surveyor.
- John Smart
- Elizabeth Tobin
- John Horne Tooke (1736–1812), an English clergyman, radical politician and philologist.
- Catherine II, Empress of Russia. Hermitage.
- Grand Dukes Alexander Pavlovich and Constantine Pavlovich, children of Czar Paul of Russia.
- Count Franciszek Ksawery Branicki (1731-1819) and two of his children; and, separately, his wife Alexandrine Vassilievna Engelhardt (1754-1838), a lady in waiting to Catherine the Great.

• Prince Alexander B. Kurakin.
