= HMS Swallow (1703) =

Ship of the line of the Royal Navy

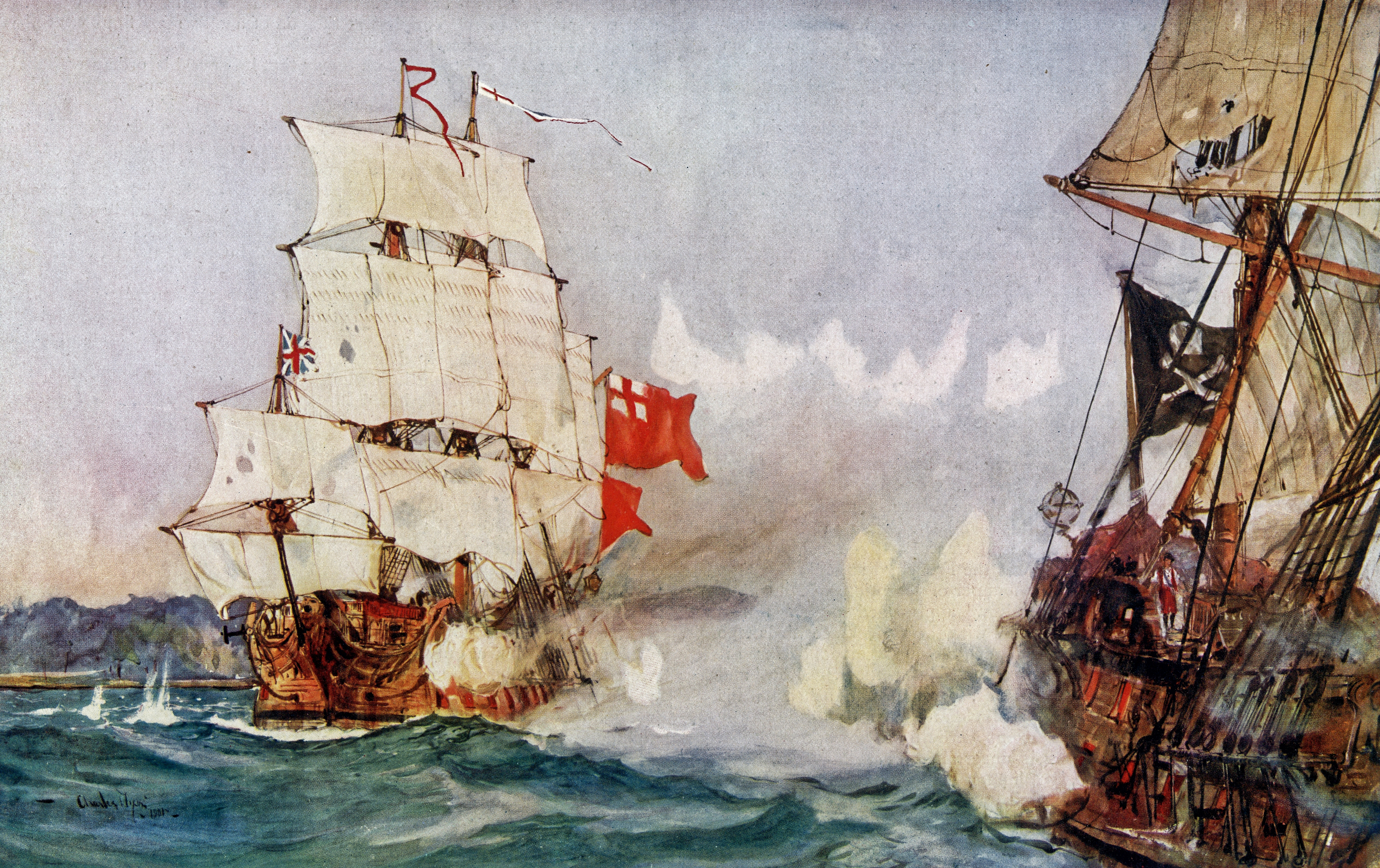
- Swallow (left) at the Battle of Cape Lopez

History

Great Britain
- Name: HMS Swallow
- Builder: Harding, Deptford Dockyard
- Launched: 10 February 1703
- Fate: Broken up, 1728

General characteristics as built
- Class & type: 50-gun fourth rate ship of the line
- Tons burthen: 673 bm
- Length: 130 ft (39.6 m) (gundeck)
- Beam: 34 ft 6 in (10.5 m)
- Depth of hold: 13 ft 6 in (4.1 m)
- Propulsion: Sails
- Sail plan: Full-rigged ship
- Armament: 50 guns of various weights of shot

General characteristics after 1719 rebuild
- Class & type: 1706 Establishment 50-gun fourth rate ship of the line
- Tons burthen: 711 bm
- Length: 130 ft (39.6 m) (gundeck)
- Beam: 35 ft (10.7 m)
- Depth of hold: 14 ft (4.3 m)
- Propulsion: Sails
- Sail plan: Full-rigged ship
- Armament: 50 guns: Gundeck: 22 × 18-pdrs; Upper gundeck: 22 × 9-pdrs; Quarterdeck: 4 × 6-pdrs; Forecastle: 2 × 6-pdrs

Colonel John Lovett in 1708 identified four men of war in this picture as the Roebuck, 42 guns, on the left, along with the Charles Galley, 36 guns, Swallow, 32 guns, and the ketch Aldborough, 24 guns, on the right; all were ships which attended on the construction of the Eddystone lighthouse, those beyond bear the flags of the countries who contributed financially to the project. Plymouth Harbour is in the background

HMS Swallow was a 50-gun fourth-rate ship of the line of the Royal Navy, built at Deptford Dockyard and launched on 10 February 1703.

Swallow was rebuilt according to the 1706 Establishment at Chatham Dockyard, and was relaunched on 25 March 1719. Captain Chaloner Ogle commanded Swallow off the West African coast from 1721 and the following year engaged and defeated several pirate ships. Their commander Bartholomew Roberts, now a pirate was killed, and Ogle received a knighthood for his actions. Swallow continued to serve until 1728, when she was broken up.
