= HMS Lys (1745) =

Sloop of the Royal Navy

History

Great Britain
- Name: HMS Lys
- Launched: 1744 as French privateer from Saint-Malo
- Completed: March 1746
- Acquired: 18 December 1745
- Commissioned: December 1745
- Decommissioned: June 1748
- In service: 1746–1748
- Fate: Sold at Woolwich Dockyard, 13 April 1749

General characteristics
- Class & type: 24-gun sloop-of-war
- Tons burthen: 366 77/94 bm
- Length: 105 ft 9 in (32.2 m) (gundeck); 82 ft 0 in (25.0 m) (keel)
- Beam: 29 ft 0 in (8.8 m)
- Depth of hold: 10 ft 9 in (3.3 m)
- Complement: 160
- Armament: 20 × 6-pdrs (gundeck); 4 × 3-pdrs (quarterdeck)

HMS Lys was a 24-gun sloop-of-war of the Royal Navy which saw active service between 1745 and 1748, during the War of the Austrian Succession. Originally the French privateer Le Lis, she was captured by the Royal Navy in 1745 and refitted as a privateer hunter. In this role she secured a single victory at sea with the capture of a 10-gun French vessel in 1747. She was declared surplus to Navy requirements in 1748 and sold into private hands in 1749.

== Construction ==
The privateer Le Lis was constructed at the French port of Saint-Malo in 1745. As built, the vessel was 105 ft 9 in (32.2 m) long with a 82 ft 0 in (25.0 m) keel, a beam of 29 ft 0 in (8.8 m) and a hold depth of 10 ft 9 in (3.3 m). Her armament as a privateer is unrecorded; when fitted out for Royal Navy service she carried 20 six-pounder cannons along her upper deck, and four three-pounder guns on the quarterdeck. Her designated complement was 160 officers and ratings.

== Active service ==
The French privateer Le Lis was put to sea in 1745 to hunt British merchant ships returning home through the English Channel. On 18 December 1745 she encountered the 70-gun British ship of the line HMS Hampton Court. Her crew surrendered at once, and on 31 December Le Lis was brought into Portsmouth with a British prize crew. She was formally purchased by Admiralty on 15 January 1746 and renamed Lys. Between January and March 1746 she fitted out for Navy service at a cost of £2,575.

The newly rebuilt vessel was then commissioned under Captain William Bateman, but did not enter active service. In August 1747 Bateman was replaced by Captain Thomas Knowler and Lys went to sea to hunt privateers off Dunkirk. In company with the 24-gun HMS Weazel she chased several small French craft before making her sole capture, the 10-gun privateer La Charlotte, in April. The captured vessel was described by contemporary sources as "a very rich prize" with a substantial cargo of trade goods; it was brought into the Nore anchorage in the Thames, and turned over to Navy authorities.

War with France ended with the Treaty of Aix-la-Chapelle in 1748. Lys was now surplus to the Navy's requirements and she was sailed to Woolwich Dockyard for decommissioning and the removal of her guns and crew. By Admiralty Order she was listed for sale in January 1749, and sold into private hands in April for £451.
