= Nicholas Haddock (1723–1781) =

Nicholas Haddock (1723 – 19 July 1781) was an English politician who sat in the House of Commons from 1754 to 1761.

Haddock was the son of Admiral Nicholas Haddock who was also MP for Rochester and the grandson of Admiral Sir Richard Haddock. He inherited Wrotham Place from his father in 1746.

Haddock was elected Member of Parliament for Rochester in 1754 and held the seat to 1761.

Haddock died on 19 July 1781, aged 58.

Haddock married Miss Medhurst of Wrotham, but had no children. Wrotham Place passed to his brother and heir-at-law, Charles Haddock.

Parliament of Great Britain
Preceded by David Polhill; Hon. John Byng	Member of Parliament for Rochester; 1754–1761; With: Hon. John Byng 1754–1757; Isaac Townsend 1757–1761	Succeeded by Viscount Parker; Isaac Townsend
