= Kentish Petition of 1701 =

The Kentish Petition of 1701 was a petition from leading citizens of the County of Kent, presented to the House of Commons of Parliament of England on 8 May 1701. The petition had been circulated at the Kentish quarter sessions held at Maidstone on 29 April, and was signed by the deputy lieutenants, grand jurors, and 23 justices, as well as a number of freeholders. The message was on Whiggish principles, asking that the Tory-dominated House would turn their loyal addresses into bills of supply, to enable the King (William III) to build a standing army and forge alliances to counteract the French threat to the peace of Europe.

An angry Commons declared the petition "scandalous, insolent and seditious; tending to destroy the constitution of Parliaments, and to subvert the established government of the realm". The five presenters of the petition were ordered into the custody of the serjeant-at-arms, then four of them were sent as prisoners to Gatehouse Prison, where they remained till the end of the session on 23 June. They were William Colepeper, chairman of the quarter sessions, who had drawn up the petition; David Polhill; Thomas Colepeper (who absconded before the others were sent to the Gatehouse); William Hamilton; and Justinian Champneys. On 14 May Daniel Defoe, flanked by a guard of sixteen gentlemen of quality in case of any attempt to arrest him, presented a Legion's Memorial (of which he was tacitly understood to be the author) to the Speaker of the House of Commons, Robert Harley. It demanded the release of the Kentish petitioners in the name of 200,000 loyal British subjects.

Since the petition had promulgated Whiggish views, and the petitioners were exercising their constitutional right to petition the legislature, the five became Whig heroes; upon their release at the end of the session they were honored at a banquet in London and eventually escorted back home to Kent in triumph, culminating in a further round of celebrations in Maidstone.

Daniel Defoe wrote a pamphlet, The History of the Kentish Petition, which presents the pro-petition Whig view of the affair, and describes the Tories (who had passed a bill of supply) as slinking quietly out of town before the session had completed, out of sheer terror of public opprobrium.
