= Benjamin Wilson (painter) =

English painter, printmaker and philosopher (1721–1788)

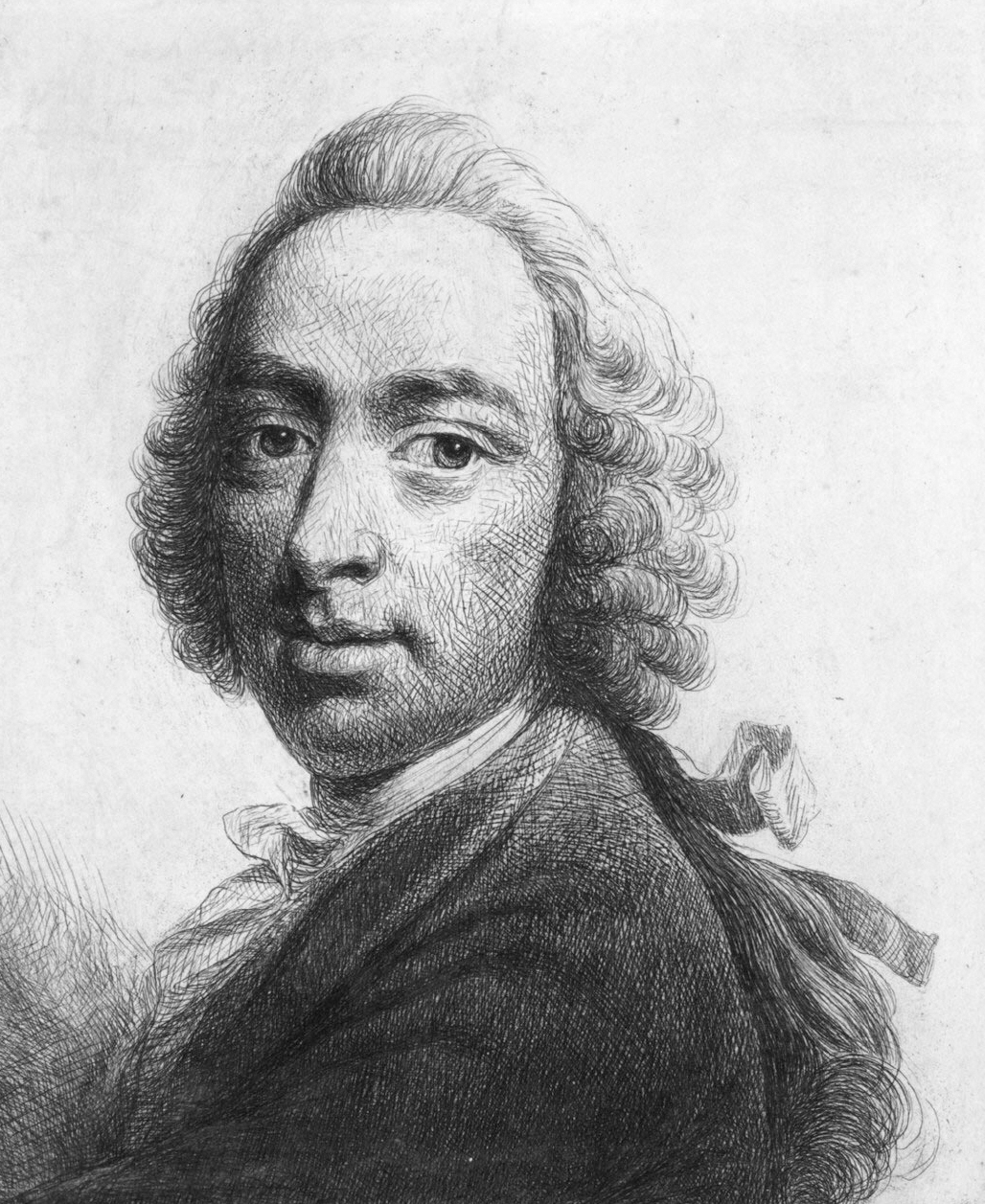
- Self-portrait, c. 1752
- Born: 21 June 1721; York, England
- Died: 6 June 1788 (aged 66)
- Occupations: Painter, printmaker, philosopher

Benjamin Wilson (21 June (O.S.) 1721 – 6 June 1788) was an English painter, printmaker and philosopher.

== Life ==
He was the 14th child of Major Wilson, a wealthy York clothier whose house was decorated by the French history painter, Jacques Parmentier (died 1730). His father's business failed and Wilson moved to London, where he became a legal clerk and began to study painting, with the encouragement of William Hogarth, taking life-drawing classes at St. Martin's Lane Academy. For two weeks in 1746 and again from 1748 to 1750 he was in Dublin, where he practised successfully as a portrait painter and electrical scientist. On his return to London he settled into Godfrey Kneller's old house in Great Queen Street and built up a lucrative portrait practice, competing with the young Joshua Reynolds. He obtained an introduction to Prince Edward, Duke of York and Albany (1739–1767), who favoured him in numerous ways, possibly through one of his sitters, Sir John Savile, later Earl of Mexborough. The Duke hired Wilson to manage his small private theater in London, and in 1773 was instrumental in having Wilson appointed as Painter to the Board of Ordnance, though he seems to have painted little after 1777.

As a scientist he opposed Benjamin Franklin's theory of positive and negative electricity. Instead, Wilson supported Isaac Newton's gravitational-optical ether, which he supposed to differ in density around bodies in accordance with their degrees of electrification. Wilson also opposed Franklin's theory of pointed lightning rods, holding that blunt conductors performed better than pointed ones.

Wilson also tried to increase the light intensity and duration of solid state luminescent materials. He was the first to presume that metal impurities affect the colour of the luminescence. He experimented with oyster shells to solidify this hypothesis, but contaminations were however too large to come to conclusions.

His best experimental work was on the electrical properties of tourmaline, which gained Wilson international recognition, including election to several European academies of science. He had already been elected a Fellow of the Royal Society in 1751 and received its gold Copley medal in 1760 for his tourmaline experiments. Amongst Wilson's art pupils were portrait painter Richard Brompton (d. 1782) and the famous future Royal Academician Johann Zoffany.

== Selected gallery ==
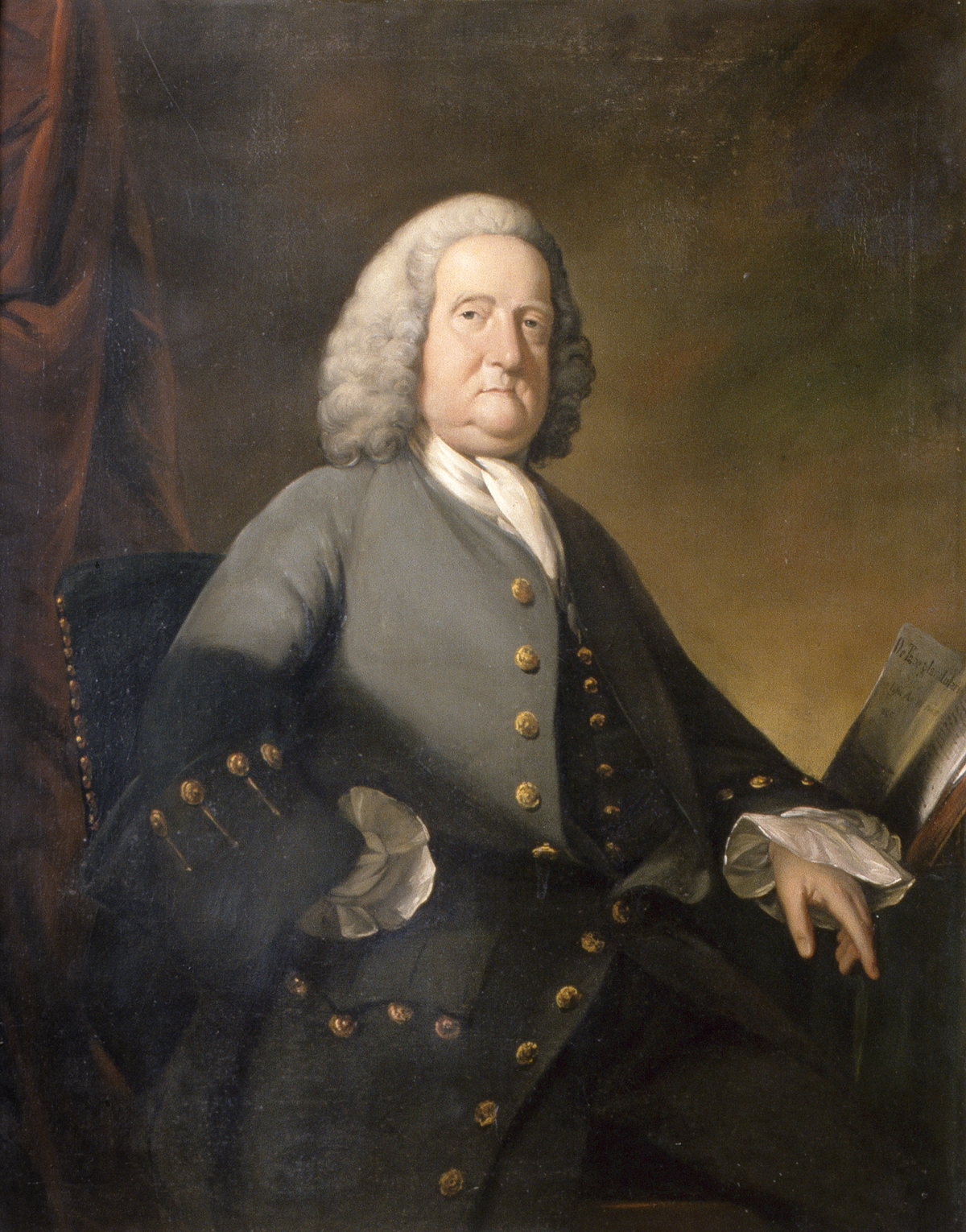
Dr Richard Russell, FRS (1755), Brighton and Hove Museums and Art Galleries

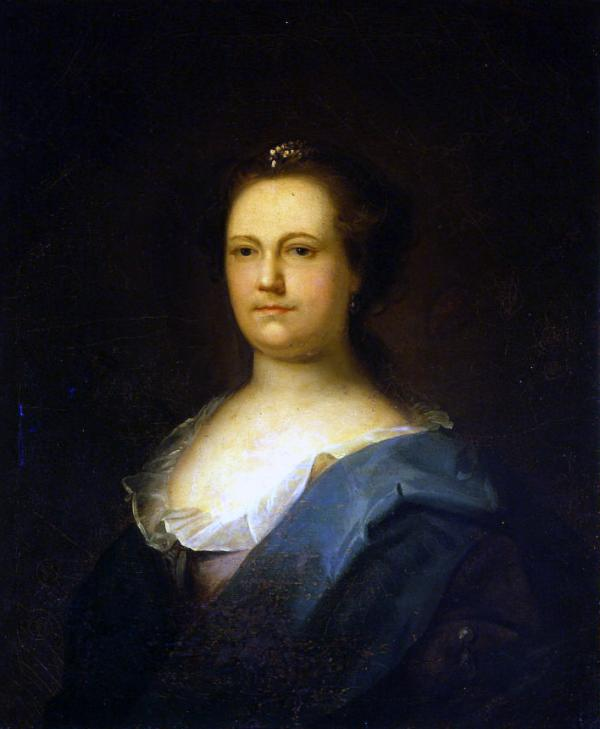
Portrait of Deborah Read Franklin (1758–59), American Philosophical Society Library & Museum

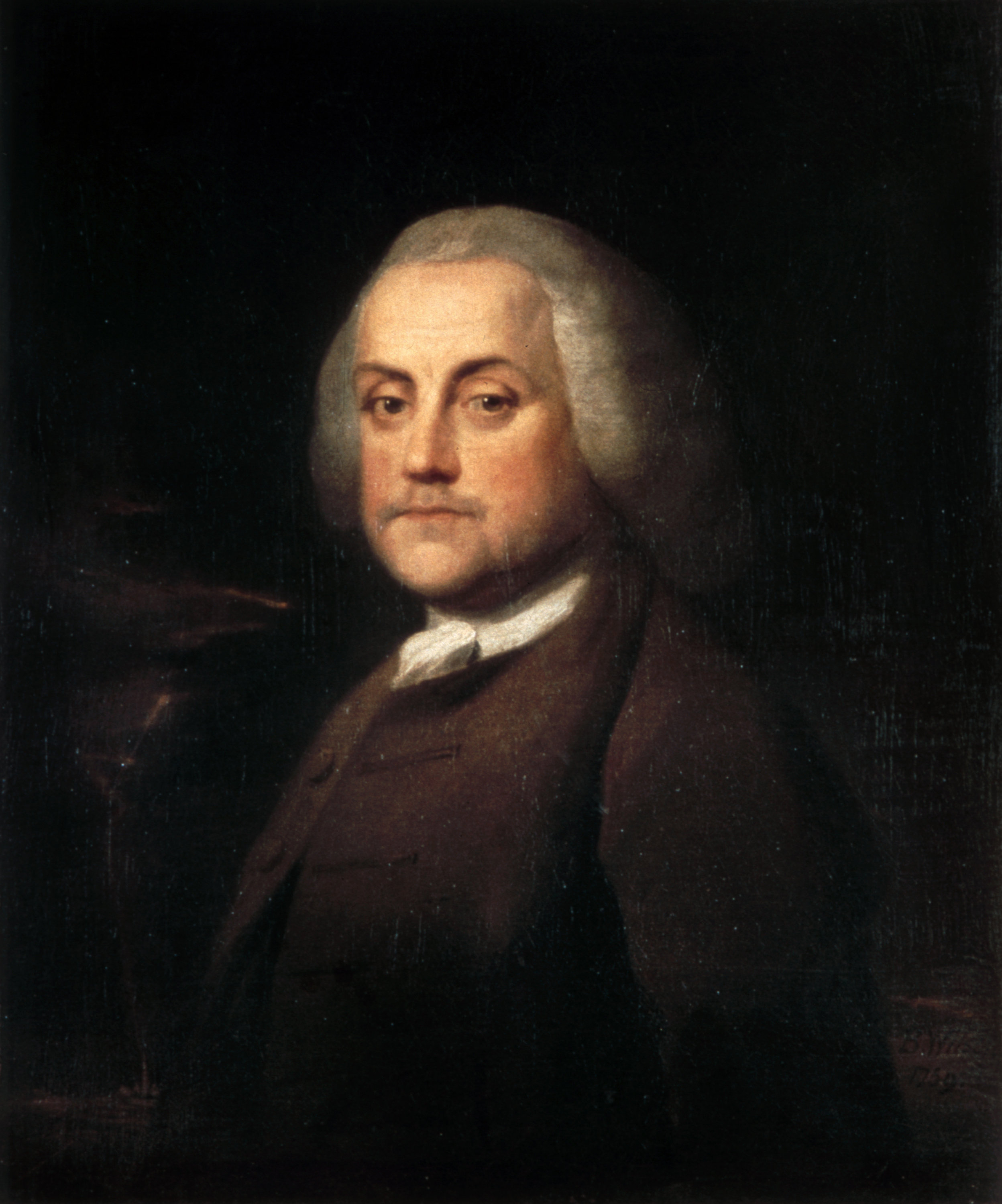
Portrait of Benjamin Franklin (1759), White House

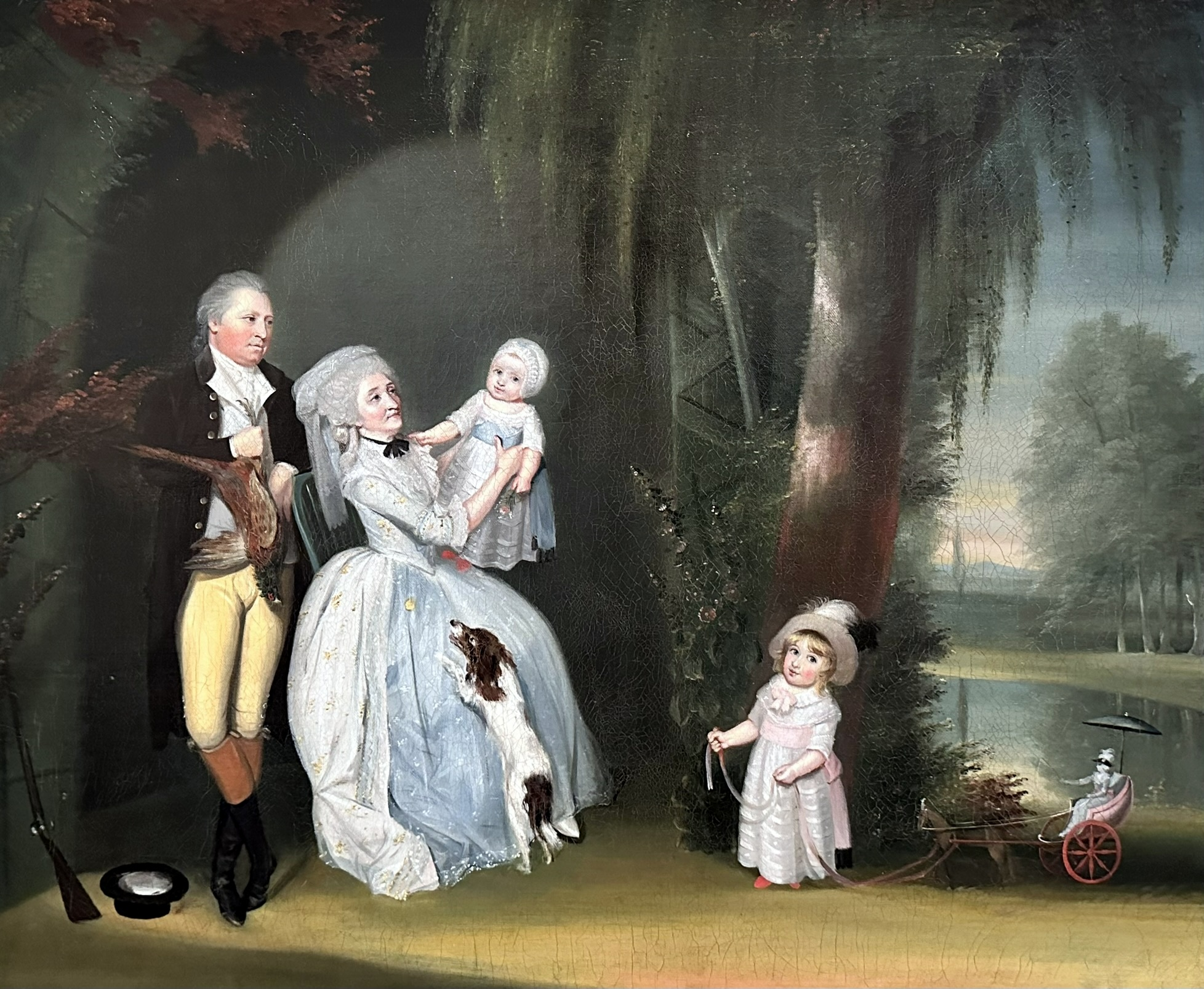
The Blandy Family (1784), Museum of the Shenandoah Valley
