= HMS Weazel (1745) =

Sloop of the Royal Navy

History

Great Britain
- Name: HMS Weazel
- Builder: James Taylor & John Randall, Rotherhithe
- Launched: 22 May 1745 at Rotherhithe
- Completed: 24 June 1745 at Deptford Dockyard
- Acquired: 22 April 1745
- Commissioned: May 1745
- In service: 1745–1749; 1752–1756; 1757–1764; 1769–1779
- Out of service: 1779
- Honours and awards: Second Battle of Cape Finisterre (1747)
- Captured: 13 January 1779 by French frigate Boudeuse

General characteristics
- Class & type: 16-gun ship-sloop
- Tons burthen: 307 65/94 bm
- Length: 94 ft 6.75 in (28.8 m) (gundeck); 76 ft 4.5 in (23.3 m) (keel)
- Beam: 27 ft 6.25 in (8.4 m)
- Depth of hold: 12 ft 0 in (3.7 m)
- Sail plan: Ship rig
- Complement: 110 (1745–1749); 125 (1749–1779)
- Armament: 16 × 6-pounder guns; 14 × ½-pdr swivel guns

HMS Weazel or Weazle was a 16-gun ship-sloop of the Royal Navy, in active service during the War of the Austrian Succession, the Seven Years' War and the American Revolutionary War. Launched in 1745, she remained in British service until 1779 and captured a total of 11 enemy vessels. She was also present, but not actively engaged, at the Second Battle of Cape Finisterre in 1747.

Weazel was captured by the French in 1779, and was later sold into private hands.

== Construction ==
The vessel that would become Weazel was built by shipwrights James Taylor and John Randall of Rotherhithe, and was initially intended to be a private merchant craft. The Royal Navy purchased the half-built vessel on 22 April 1745 and hired Taylor and Randall to complete her for naval service. The fee for the vessel and her completion was £2,387.

Once ownership of the vessel had passed into Navy hands, Randall and Taylor were directed to complete her in accordance with an experimental design, as the Royal Navy's first three-masted ship rigged sloop. The quarterdeck was lengthened from the original plans in order to incorporate a mizzen mast, with the intention that the additional sails would enhance speed and maneuverability compared to the traditional two-masted snow rig sloop. This proved sufficiently successful that from 1756 ship rigging became the standard for all subsequent 14-gun and 16-gun sloops in Royal Navy hands.

As built, Weazel was 94 ft 6.75 in (28.8 m) long with a 76 ft 4.5 in (23.3 m) keel, a beam of 27 ft 6.25 in (8.3884 m), and a hold depth of 12 ft 0 in (3.7 m). She was constructed with eighteen broadside gunports and two bow chasers, although in practice she carried only sixteen cannons with the remaining ports left unused. Despite this, at the time of her launch she was the most heavily armed sloop in the Navy. Her designated complement was 110 officers and ratings from 1745 to 1749, rising to 125 thereafter.

== Navy service ==
=== European waters ===
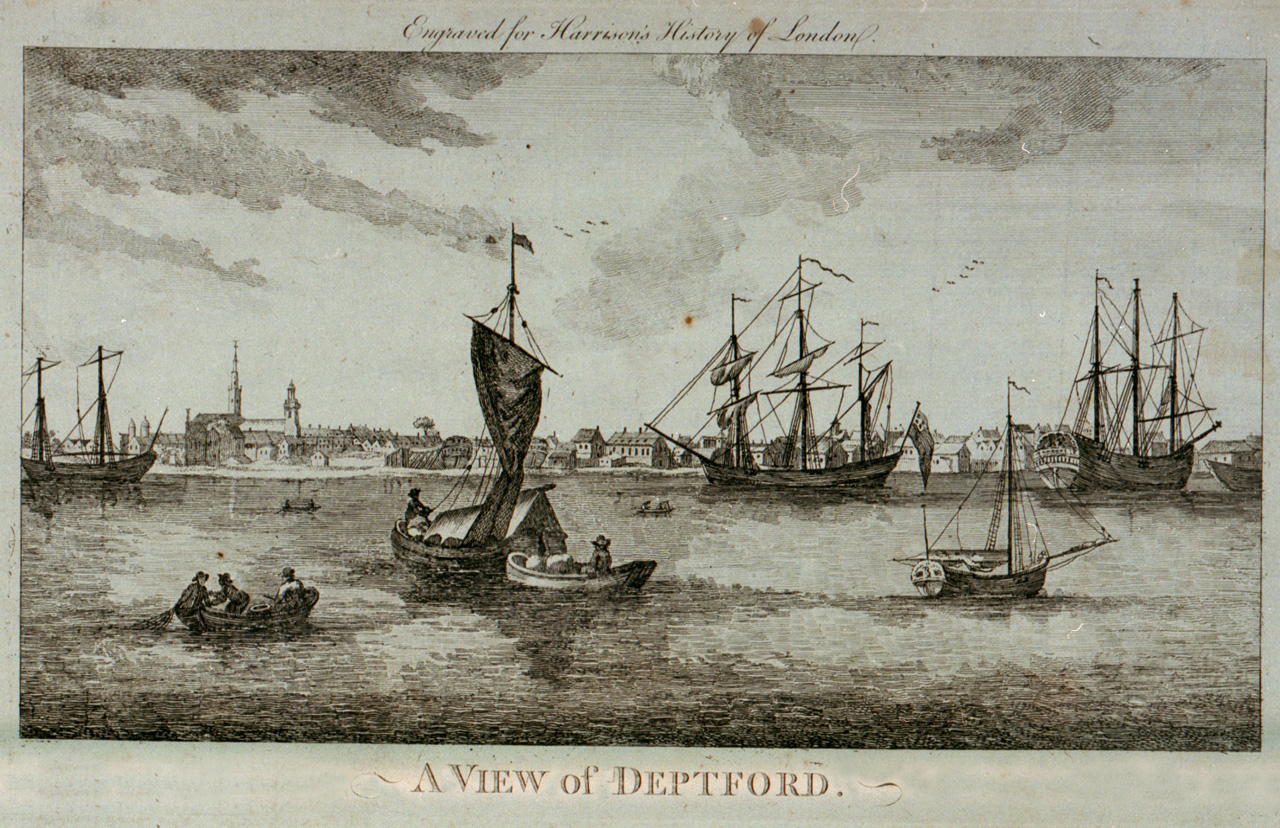
Waterfront at Deptford, where Weazel was commissioned for service in 1745.

Weazel was launched on 22 May 1745 and sailed to Deptford Dockyard for fitout and to take on armament and crew. She was formally commissioned on 24 June under Commander Thomas Craven, entering Royal Navy service at the height of the War of Austrian Succession which pitted coalitions broadly comprising France, Prussia and Spain, against Britain, the Habsburg monarchy and the Dutch Republic. Craven's orders were to take Weazel into the English Channel and the Downs to patrol for enemy privateers. The new-built sloop was swiftly in action, capturing the privateer Le Renard in the Channel on 23 November. In February 1746 Craven was replaced by Lieutenant Hugh Palliser, who immediately pressed Weazel back into active service. The 8-gun French privateer La Revanche was captured on 27 March, followed by La Charmante on 1 April. One further privateer narrowly avoided capture off Spithead in early April when Weazel's approach was slowed by light winds. The French vessel escaped only after throwing its cannons overboard to increase its speed.

Further victories followed that year with Weazel capturing the privateers L'Epervier on 29 July, Le Delangle on 3 August and both La Fortune and La Jeantie on 8 October. In November she encountered a large 30-gun French privateer in the Bay of Biscay, and opened fire despite being considerably outgunned. A contemporaneous newspaper report describes Weazel's crew as fighting "very bravely for a considerable time," before the advantage swung to the British with the arrival of the 58-gun fourth rate HMS Princess Louisa. The privateer turned to flee but was driven ashore and wrecked near Port-Louis, Morbihan.

At the end of the year Commander Palliser was made post-captain and assigned to the 70-gun ship of the line HMS Captain; his place on Weazel was taken by Commander Samuel Barrington. On 24 April 1747 Weazel was off the Dutch coastline and in company with HMS Lys, when she encountered and defeated the privateers La Gorgonne and La Charlotte.

Vessels captured by Weazel in 1745–47
Date	Ship	Nationality (home port)	Type	Fate	Ref.
23 November 1745	Le Renard	French (Dunkirk)	Privateer	Captured	
27 March 1746	La Revanche	French (Bordeaux)	Privateer: 8 guns, 110 crew	Captured	
1 April 1746	La Charmante	French	Privateer: 4 guns, 57 crew	Captured	
29 July 1746	L'Epervier	French	Privateer	Captured	
3 August 1746	Le Delangle	French	Privateer	Captured	
8 October 1746	La Fortune	French	Privateer	Captured	
8 October 1746	La Jeantie	French	Privateer	Captured	
Late November 1746	Not recorded	French	Privateer: 30 guns, "well manned"	Destroyed	
24 April 1747	La Gorgonne	French	Privateer	Captured	
24 April 1747	La Charlotte	French	Privateer	Captured	

In June 1747 Weazel returned to port at Plymouth, where Barrington was replaced by Commander John Midwinter. There she remained until 30 August when she was joined to a squadron under Admiral Peter Warren, with orders to reinforce a British fleet in position off the French island of Ushant. Poor weather delayed the voyage, and Weazel did not reach her destination until 26 September. The fleet commander, Admiral Edward Hawke immediately allocated her the role of carrying messages between his ships of the line. On the morning of 14 October the fleet was offshore from Cape Finisterre when it encountered a French force of eight ships of the line, escorting a convoy of 252 merchant vessels. Hawke approached from the leeward while the French sailed close-hauled in a line ahead, expecting that he would engage in a long-range artillery duel. Instead, Hawke made the signal for a general chase, freeing his captains from the constraints of a formal battle; the British then overhauled the French line and enveloped it from rear to van, capturing six ships. Around 4,000 French sailors were captured or killed, against 757 British casualties.

During the battle the merchant convoy, and the remaining two French naval vessels, had escaped to the west with the intention of reaching the French Caribbean. Weazel had been too small to join the line of battle the previous day, but Admiral Hawke now deputised her to sail in haste for the Royal Navy's Jamaica Station with a message advising the likely course of the French convoy. Weazel reached the Caribbean before most of the French convoy; the Royal Navy squadron based in the Leeward Islands put immediately to sea and was successful in intercepting 40 French ships and taking 900 prisoners.

During the Seven Years' War, Commodore John Moore dispatched Weazel to the neutral Dutch island of Sint Eustatius in December 1757. The ship warned the island's governor that nearby French islands were being blockaded and any ships attempting to defy the blockade would be attacked. Weazel's appearance caused a panic on the island with the governor temporarily halting outgoing trade.

On 7 September the USS Raleigh intercepted a British convoy and engaged HMS Druid. In the ensuing battle she damaged Druid, but the approach of the other British escorts, HMS Camel and Weazel, forced Raleigh to retire.

== Final voyage ==
In 1779 Weazel was off the Caribbean island of St Eustatius when she was captured by the 32-gun French frigate Boudeuse, under Lieutenant Grenier. The French took their prize to the Antilles where she was disarmed and her guns transferred to Admiral d'Estaing's squadron. They then sold her at Guadeloupe in 1781.
