= William Colepeper =

English poet and politician (died 1726)

William Colepeper (died 1726) was an English poet and politician.

== Life ==
Colepeper was the eldest son of Sir Thomas Colepeper, of Hollingbourn (since the 18th-century Hollingbourne), Kent.

He was one of five gentlemen who, on 8 May 1701, delivered the Kentish Petition to the House of Commons of England. Colepeper was the chairman of the quarter sessions at Maidstone and drew up the petition. It was from the deputy-lieutenants, justices, and grand jurors of Kent, desiring that the house would turn their loyal addresses into a bill of supply and other matter. The petition was voted insolent and seditious, and they were ordered into the custody of the serjeant-at-arms and then sent as prisoners to the Gatehouse, where they remained till the end of the session.

After a quarrel with Sir George Rooke arising from the petition, Colepeper claimed that an attempt was made upon his life on behalf of Rooke. He had been assaulted at Windsor Castle in July 1703, by Sir Jacob Banks in particular, on the occasion of Colepeper's delivering a petition for Daniel Defoe, who was imprisoned. After a trial before Lord-justice Sir John Holt, 14 February 1704, three persons were fined for attempts to do him injury: the friends of Rooke, named Denew, Merriam, and Britton. The matter did not rest there since Colepeper then brought a suit against Edward Knatchbull, and in 1706 Rooke himself sued Colepeper for scandal.

== Works ==
He was the author of a Heroick Poem upon the King, 1694, and a Poem to the Lady Duty, and Poem to the Rev. John Brandreth, in Miscellaneous Poems and Translations by Several Hands, published by Richard Savage, son of Earl Rivers, 1726.

== Family ==
By his wife, Elizabeth Gill, he had three sons and three daughters.
