= HMS Queenborough (1694) =

British warship

History

England
- Name: HMS Queenborough
- Ordered: 6 April 1694
- Builder: Royal Dockyard, Sheerness
- Launched: 22 December 1694
- Commissioned: 10 December 1694
- Fate: Sold 20 August 1719

General characteristics
- Type: 20-gun sixth rate
- Tons burthen: 261 83/94 bm
- Length: 96 ft 4 in (29.4 m) gundeck; 80 ft 4.5 in (24.5 m) keel for tonnage
- Beam: 24 ft 9 in (7.5 m) for tonnage
- Depth of hold: 10 ft 10 in (3.3 m)
- Armament: initially as ordered; 20 × sakers on wooden trucks (UD); 4 × 3-pdr on wooden trucks (QD); 1703 Establishment; 20 × 6-pdrs on wooden trucks (UD); 4 × 4-pdr on wooden trucks (QD)

HMS Queenborough was a member of the standardised 20-gun sixth rates built at the end of the 17th century. The bulk of her career was spent in Home Waters. During her time in the English Channel she took three French privateers. She went to the Leeward Islands where two of her captains died before returning home. She was sold in 1719.

Queenborough was the second named vessel after it was used for a 4-gun yacht launched at Chatham Dockyard in 1671, rebuilt at Sheerness in 1718 and sold on 11 July 1777.

== Construction ==
She was ordered in the second batch of eight ships from Sheerness Dockyard to be built under the guidance of their master shipwright, William Bagwell. She was launched on 22 December 1694.

== Commissioned service ==
She was commissioned on 10 December 1694 under the command of Captain Horatio Townsend, RN. On 5 March 1695 she came under the temporary command of Captain John Moses, RN. Captain Theophilus Hodgson, RN took command on 16 March. She took the privateer L'Esperance on 29 March 1695. Captain Hodgson drowned on 6th of May. Captain Thomas Swanton, RN took command on the 8th, then proceeded to the Irish Sea. Captain Gardiner, RN took command on 27 May 1697. The ship then was assigned to the English Channel and took the privateers Le Saint-Antoine on 8 July and Le Suprenaut on 7 August. She then transferred to the Leeward Islands where Captain Gardiner died in 1698. Captain John Oak, RN took command on 9 November 1698 and remained until his death on 13 January 1699. On 12 January 1699 Captain Rupert Billingsley, RN took command and was ordered to return to Home Waters.

In 1700 she fell under the command of Captain Henry Crofts, RN for service in the Baltic. in 1701 she was under command of Captain Edward Owen, RN off Dunkirk, and in 1702 she was with Beaumont's Squadron under command of Captain Thomas Day, RN.In August 1702 she came under command of Commander Abraham Tudor, RN for service in the North Sea. She remained in the North Sea in 1704 under Commander William Herriott, then in November 1704 under Commander John Jephcott, RN and 1707 under Commander Chaloner Ogle, RN. In May 1708 she came under Commander Charles Brown, RN. In 1709 she sailed to New York. During 1709 she underwent a great repair or rebuild at Portsmouth. Between 1709 and 1711 she was under the command of Commander Michael Polkinghorne, RN on the Glasgow station. In 1712 she was under Commander Thomas Harwood, RN to control owling between 1713 and 1714. In July thru August 1715 she underwent a refit at Deptford at a cost of 1,125.12.2 1/4d. (Note: A total amount accounting for inflation of approximately £212,400 in today's money.) She was recommissioned in July 1715 under Captain Charles Kendall for service at the Firth of Forth. Captain George Fairly was her last commander for Baltic convoys in 1717.

== Disposition ==
HMS Queenborough was sold at Deptford for £102 (Note: A total amount accounting for inflation of approximately £17,200 in today's money.) on 20 August 1719.
