= HMS Tartar (1702) =

History

England
- Name: HMS Tartar
- Ordered: 7 April 1702
- Builder: Woolwich Dockyard
- Launched: 12 September 1702
- Commissioned: August 1702
- Honours and awards: Velez Malaga 1704
- Fate: Breaking at Deptford completed 24 June 1755

General characteristics as built
- Class & type: 32-gun fifth rate
- Tons burthen: 4207/94 tons (bm)
- Length: 108 ft 0 in (32.92 m) gundeck; 90 ft 9 in (27.66 m) keel for tonnage
- Beam: 29 ft 6 in (8.99 m)
- Depth of hold: 13 ft 0 in (3.96 m)
- Propulsion: Sails
- Sail plan: Full-rigged ship
- Complement: 145/110
- Armament: as built 32 guns; 4/4 × demi-culverins (LD); 22/20 × 6-pdr guns (UD); 6/4 × 4-pdr guns (QD)

General characteristics 1733 establishment
- Class & type: 20-gun sixth rate
- Tons burthen: 43025/94 tons (bm)
- Length: 106 ft 0 in (32.31 m) gundeck; 86 ft 11.5 in (26.50 m) keel for tonnage
- Beam: 30 ft 6 in (9.30 m)
- Depth of hold: 9 ft 5 in (2.87 m)
- Propulsion: Sails
- Sail plan: Full-rigged ship
- Armament: 1733 establishment 20 guns; 20 × 9-pdr guns (UD)

HMS Tartar was a 32-gun fifth rate built by the Woolwich Dockyard in 1702. Her initial commissioning was in time for the War of the Spanish Succession. She partook in the Battle of Velez Malaga in 1704. She spent the rest of her career on counter piracy and trade protection patrols. She was rebuilt as a 20-gun sixth rate in 1733. She was finally broken in 1755.

She was the first vessel to carry this name in the English and Royal Navy.

She was awarded the battle honour Velez Malaga 1704.

== Construction and specifications ==
She was ordered on 7 April 1702 to be built at Woolwich Dockyard under the guidance of Master Shipwright Fisher Harding. Her name was established on 7 September and she was launched on 12 September 1702. Her dimensions were a gundeck of 108 feet 0 inches (32.92 metres) with a keel of 90 feet 9 inches (27.66 metres) for tonnage calculation with a breadth of 29 feet 6 inches (8.99 metres) and a depth of hold of 13 feet 0 inches (3.96 metres). Her builder's measure tonnage was calculated as 4207/94 tons (burthen).

The gun armament initially was four demi-culverins (Note: A demi-culverin was a gun of 3,400 pounds with a four-inch bore firing a 9.5-pound shot with an eight-pound powder charge) on the lower deck (LD) with two pair of guns per side. The upper deck (UD) battery would consist of between twenty and twenty-two 6-pounder guns (Note: A 6-pounder was a Dutch gun used to replace the saker.) with ten or eleven guns per side. The gun battery would be completed by four 4-pounder guns (Note: A minion renamed the 4-pounder was a gun of 1,000 pounds with a 3.5-inch bore firing a 4-pound shot with a 4-pound powder charge.) on the quarterdeck (QD) with two to three guns per side.

== Commissioned service ==
=== Service 1702–1733 ===
She was commissioned in August 1702 under the command of Captain Richard Canning. In 1703 she was under Captain John Cooper assigned to Sir George Rooke's Fleet bound for the Mediterranean. She took the privateer La Bonne-Union on 3 August 1704. She was at the Battle of Velez Malaga on 13 August 1704 and suffered no casualties. Following the battle she came under Captain Thomas Legge. She served in Vice-Admiral Sir John Leake's Squadron over the winter of 1704–05. During January 1705 Captain George Fisher was appointed her commander for service in the West Indies. With the death of Fisher on 18 August 1705, Captain Richard Leake took command. She captured in concert with Adventure the French 36-gun Les Jeux (Note: incorporated into Royal Navy as Child's Play) in the North Sea on 7 June 1706. Later during 1707 she was under Captain Edward St Lo. Around May 1708 Captain Chaloner Ogle was her commander assigned to Admiral Sir George Byng's fleet in the North Sea. In September she was sailing with Captain Mighell's squadron. She captured the privateer L'Entreprenant on 3 November 1708. She escorted convoys to Newfoundland during 1709–10. During 1711–12 she was again in the Mediterranean.

She was fitted at Deptford between March 1713 and July 1714 at a cost of £2,902.1.10.75d (accounting for inflation £490,100). She was under Captain Christopher Parker off the west coast of Scotland in 1715. During 1717–19 she patrolled off Sale, Morocco. Upon returning home, she was fitted at Deptford for £5,147.10.5.25d (accounting for inflation £958,100) from September 1720 to January 1721, then was placed in Ordinary. She was fitted at Deptford for service in Virginia at a cost of £1,391.15.4d (accounting for inflation £247,800). In 1725 Captain Vincent Pearce took command for service at Virginia, returning in 1728. Upon her return she was fitted at Deptford for £2,434.5.6d (accounting for inflation £433,700) in November 1728. In 1729 she was fitted and rerated as a 20-gun sixth rate. In 1728 Captain George Proctor assumed command for service at Jamaica. She returned and was paid off on 7 June 1732. She was dismantled at Deptford in May 1733 with the intent of rebuilding.

=== Rebuild at Deptford Dockyard 1733–34 ===
She was ordered on 19 April 1733 to be rebuilt under the 1733 establishment as a 20-gun sixth rate at Deptford Dockyard under the guidance of Master Shipwright Richard Stacey. Her keel was laid on 23 August 1733 and launched on 28 March 1734. Her dimensions were a gundeck of 106 feet 0 inches (32.31 metres) with a keel of 86 feet 11.5 inches (26.50 metres) for tonnage calculation with a breadth of 30 feet 6 inches (9.30 metres) and a depth of hold of 9 feet 5 inches (2.87 metres). Her builder's measure tonnage was calculated as 43025/94 tons (burthen). Her gun armament was in accordance with the 1733 Establishment for a 20-gun sixth rate consisting of twenty 9-pounder guns on the upper Deck (UD). She was completed for sea on 2 May 1734 at an initial cost of £5,612.11.3d (accounting for inflation £1,094,600) including fitting.

=== Service 1734–1755 ===
HMS Tartar was commissioned in 1734 under the command of Captain Matthew Norris for service at New York. She returned to Home Waters and was paid off on 6 November 1736. She underwent a middling repair and fitting at Portsmouth at a cost of 2,900.12.9d (accounting for inflation £560,400) between November 1738 and March 1739. She was recommissioned in January 1739 under Captain George Townsend for service at South Carolina.

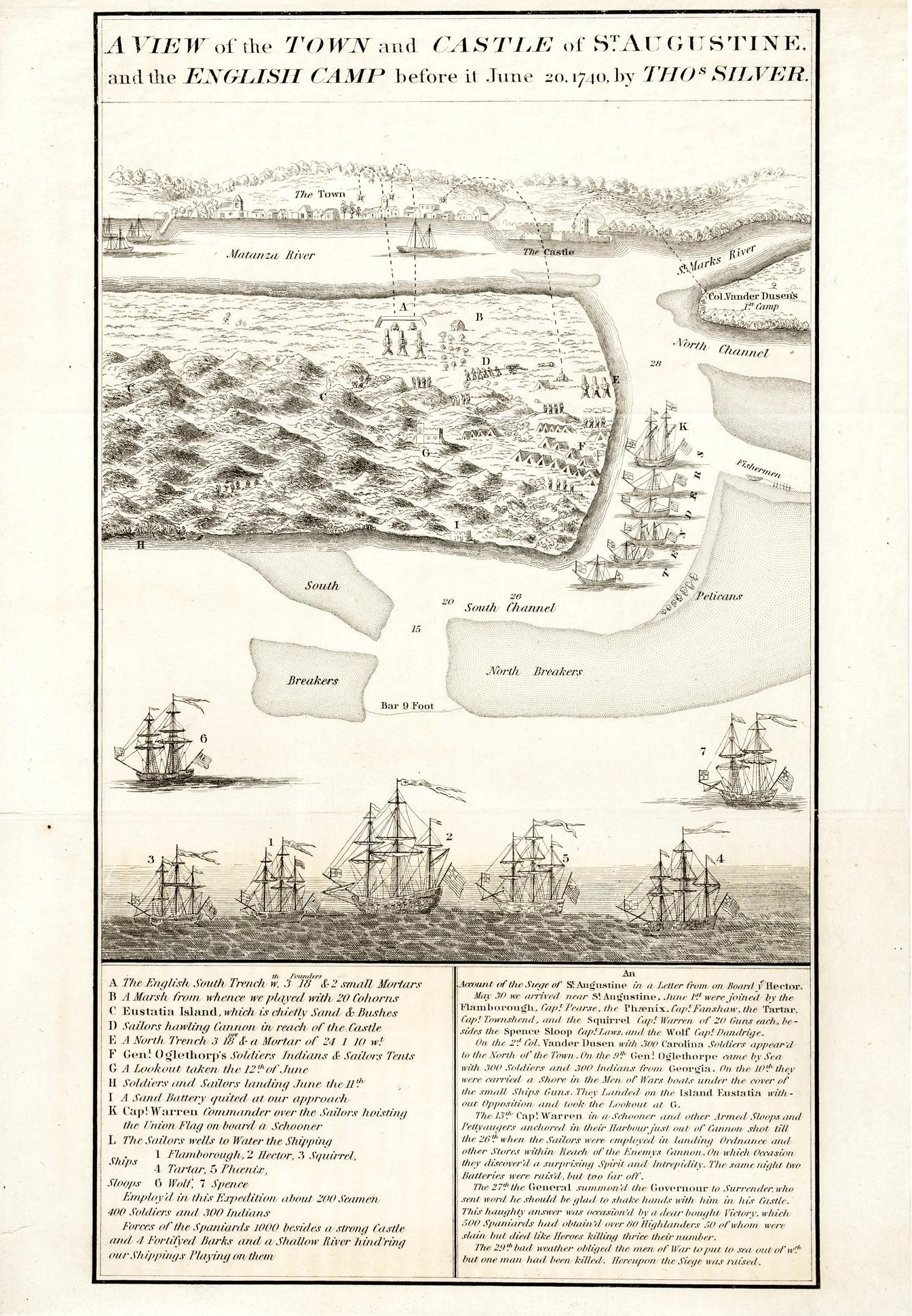
A View of the Town and Castle of St. Augustine, and the English Camp before it June 20, 1740, Tartar shown. The Gentleman's Magazine, 1740

She was involved in the Georgia operation in April to June 1740. She captured the privateer Virgin del Rosario on 4 August 1741. Around December 1741 Captain Thomas Lake was appointed Commander. She was patrolling in the Western Approaches in February the moving to the Orkney Islands in July 1742. She capture the privateer Nuestra Senora del Carmino on 17 April 1742. She was refitted at Portsmouth for £2,882.14.6d (accounting for inflation £547,600) in September/October 1742. She then was refitted at Sheerness for £2,500.8.4d (accounting for inflation £520,000) between July and September 1743.

In 1744 she was under the command of Captain Henry Ward for service at South Carolina. She captured the privateer San Francisco Xavier on 6 May 1746. Upon her return to Home Waters, she uderwent a great repair and fitting at Deptford at a cost of £6,329.17.1d (accounting for inflation £1,316,100) between January and September 1747. HMS Tartar was recommissioned in July 1747 under the command of Captain William Brett, then sailed for the East Indies to convey the terms of the peace treaty that ended the Austrian War of Succession. She remained in the East Indies until 1751 when she returned to Home Waters to pay off in May 1752.

== Disposition ==
She was surveyed om 5 August 1752 with a repair recommended but was not carried out. She was placed in Ordinary. She was surveyed again in September 1755. By Admiralty Order (AO) 14 April 1755 she was ordered to be broken. Her breaking was completed at Deptford Dockyard on 24 June 1755.
