= HMS Dunkirk (1660) =

Ship of the line of the Royal Navy

History

Great Britain
- Name: Worcester
- Namesake: Battle of Worcester (1651); Battle of Dunkirk (1658)
- Builder: Andrew Burrell, Woolwich Dockyard
- Launched: 1651
- Renamed: HMS Dunkirk in June 1660
- Fate: Broken up, March 1749

General characteristics as built
- Class & type: 48-gun third rate frigate
- Tons burthen: 629 24/94 bm originally, 661 88/94 after girdling
- Length: 141 ft 5 in (43.1 m) (gundeck), 112 ft (34.1 m) (keel)
- Beam: 32 ft 6 in (9.9 m) (originally), 33 ft 4 in (10.2 m) (after girdling)
- Depth of hold: 14 ft (4.3 m)
- Propulsion: Sails
- Sail plan: Full-rigged ship
- Armament: 48 guns (at launch); 60 guns (by 1677)

General characteristics after 1704 rebuild
- Class & type: 60-gun fourth rate ship of the line
- Tons burthen: 906 59/94 bm
- Length: 141 ft 6 in (43.1 m) (gundeck), 116 ft 6 in (35.5 m) (keel)
- Beam: 38 ft 3 in (11.7 m)
- Depth of hold: 15 ft 7.5 in (4.8 m)
- Propulsion: Sails
- Sail plan: Full-rigged ship
- Armament: 60 guns of various weights of shot

General characteristics after 1734 rebuild
- Class & type: 1719 Establishment 60-gun fourth rate ship of the line
- Tons burthen: 966 50/94 bm
- Length: 144 ft (43.9 m) (gundeck), 117 ft 7 in (35.8 m) (keel)
- Beam: 39 ft 3 in (12.0 m)
- Depth of hold: 16 ft 4 in (5.0 m)
- Propulsion: Sails
- Sail plan: Full-rigged ship
- Armament: 60 guns: Gundeck: 24 × 24 pdrs; Upper gundeck: 26 × 9 pdrs; Quarterdeck: 8 × 6 pdrs; Forecastle: 2 × 6 pdrs

The Worcester was a 48-gun Third rate frigate built for the navy of the Commonwealth of England at Woolwich Dockyard by Master Shipwright Andrew Burrell (the son of William Burrell, the leading shipwright of King James VI and I) and was launched in 1651. She was named for the Parliamentary victory at the Battle of Worcester (which took place on 3 September 1651, and was the last major battle of the 1642 to 1651 Wars of the Three Kingdoms).

She had originally been ordered in late March 1649 as one of three Fourth rate frigates to carry 38 guns, but was altered while building and completed as a Third Rate (two-decker) with 48 guns. However she only measured 112 ft on the keel and so had only twelve pairs of gunports on the lower deck (most Third rates had thirteen) and eleven pairs on the upper deck (most Third rates had twelve); she eventually had six pairs of ports on the quarterdeck and one pair on the poop, allowing her to carry a maximum of 60 guns.

The Worcester took part in several battles during the First Anglo-Dutch War. She fought in the Battle of Dover in May 1652, the Battle of Dungeness in November 1652, and the Battle of Portland (the "Three Days' Battle") in February 1653. She also participated in the Battle of Santa Cruz off Tenerife in April 1657 during the Anglo-Spanish War (1654-1660).

After the Stuart Restoration in June 1660, the ship became part of the Royal Navy and was renamed HMS Dunkirk after the location of the Battle of the Dunes (1658). She was established with a peacetime complement of 48 guns and 230 men. During the Second Anglo-Dutch War she took part in the Battle of Lowestoft in June 1665, the Four Days' Battle in April 1666, and the St James Day Battle in July 1666. In the Third Anglo-Dutch War she took part in the Battle of Solebay in May 1672, in the two Battles of Schooneveld in May and June 1673, and in the Battle of Texel in August 1673.

In 1692 she underwent a "Great Repair" at Blackwall shipyard, during which she was girdled, with her beam increasing to 33 ft 4 in. She was re-classed as a Fourth rate ship of the linein 1695–96, and then rebuilt by Admiralty Order of 20 September 1703 under a contract with Sir Henry Johnson at his shipyard at Blackwall Yard, being re-launched in December 1704. On 12 September 1729 Dunkirk was ordered to be taken to pieces at Plymouth Dockyard, after which her 'material remains' (i.e. usable timbers) were transported to Portsmouth Dockyard, where she was "rebuilt" (actually a legal fiction) by Master Shipwright Joseph Allin, still as a 60-gun fourth rate but to the specifications of the 1719 Establishment. She was relaunched on 3 September 1734.

Dunkirk took part in the Battle of Toulon in February 1744, and was finally broken up by March 1749 (under Admiralty Order of 8 November 1748).
