= HMS Hampton Court (1709) =

Ship of the line of the Royal Navy

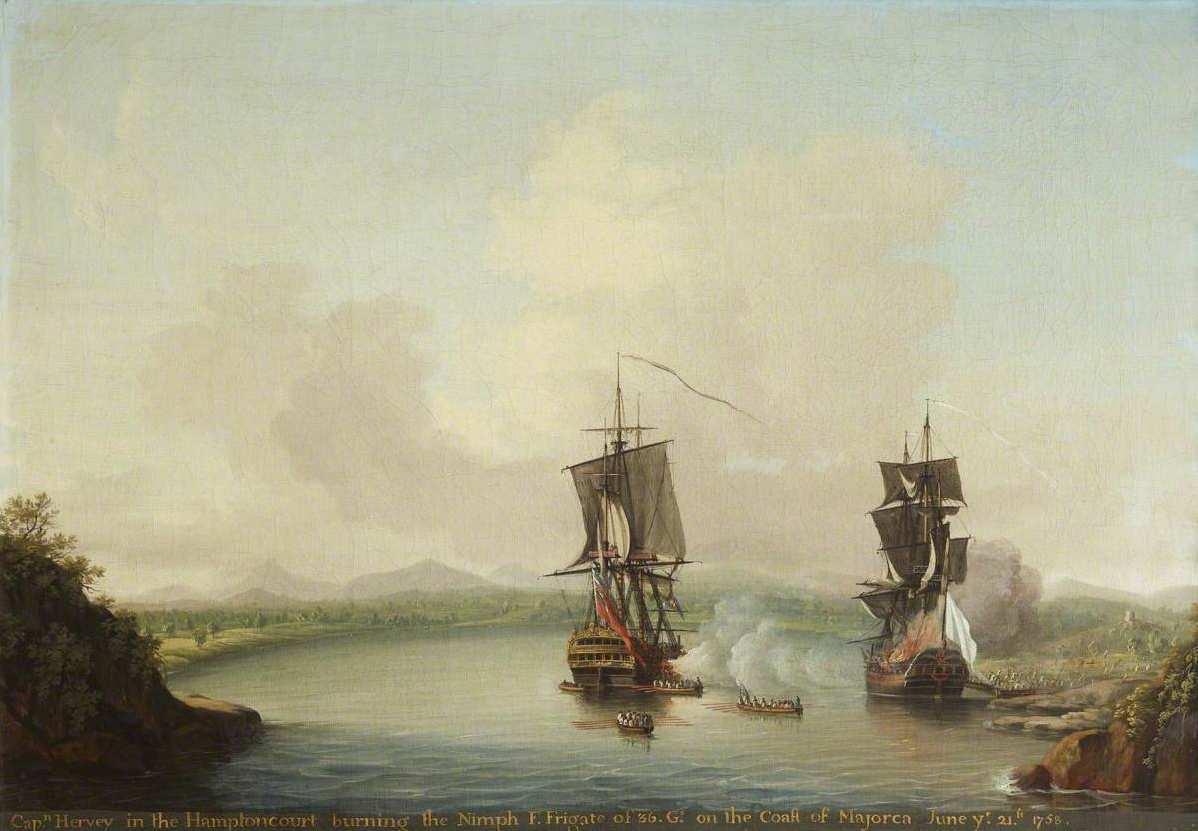
- Hampton Court destroying the French frigate La Nymphe in 1757 in the Mediterranean.

History

Great Britain
- Name: HMS Hampton Court
- Builder: Taylor, Rotherhithe
- Launched: 19 August 1709
- Fate: Broken up, 1774

General characteristics as built
- Class & type: 1706 Establishment 70-gun third-rate ship of the line
- Tons burthen: 1,137 bm
- Length: 150 ft (45.7 m) (gundeck)
- Beam: 41 ft (12.5 m)
- Depth of hold: 17 ft 4 in (5.3 m)
- Propulsion: Sails
- Sail plan: Full-rigged ship
- Armament: 70 guns: Gundeck: 26 × 24-pdrs; Upper gundeck: 26 × 12-pdrs; Quarterdeck: 14 × 6-pdrs; Forecastle: 4 × 6-pdrs

General characteristics after 1744 rebuild
- Class & type: 1741 proposals 64-gun third rate ship of the line
- Tons burthen: 1,283
- Length: 154 ft (46.9 m) (gundeck)
- Beam: 44 ft (13.4 m)
- Depth of hold: 18 ft 11 in (5.8 m)
- Propulsion: Sails
- Sail plan: Full-rigged ship
- Armament: 64 guns: Gundeck: 26 × 32-pdrs; Upper gundeck: 26 × 18-pdrs; Quarterdeck: 10 × 9-pdrs; Forecastle: 2 × 9-pdrs

HMS Hampton Court was a 70-gun third-rate ship of the line of the Royal Navy, built at Rotherhithe according to the 1706 Establishment and launched on 19 August 1709.

Hampton Court was part of Vice-Admiral Edward Vernon's fleet and took part in the expedition to Cartagena de Indias during the War of Jenkins' Ear.

On 12 December 1741 orders were issued for Hampton Court to be taken to pieces and rebuilt by Joseph Allin the younger at Deptford Dockyard as a 64-gun third rate to the 1741 proposals of the 1719 Establishment. She was relaunched on 3 April 1744.

In November 1745 she encountered her fellow Royal Navy vessel HMS Defiance. The crew of both vessels mistook the other for a French man-o-war and opened fire at long range. The engagement ended after half an hour, when crew aboard Defiance observed British markings on the cannonballs striking their ship and signaled for a truce.

Hampton Court remained in service until 1774, when she was broken up.

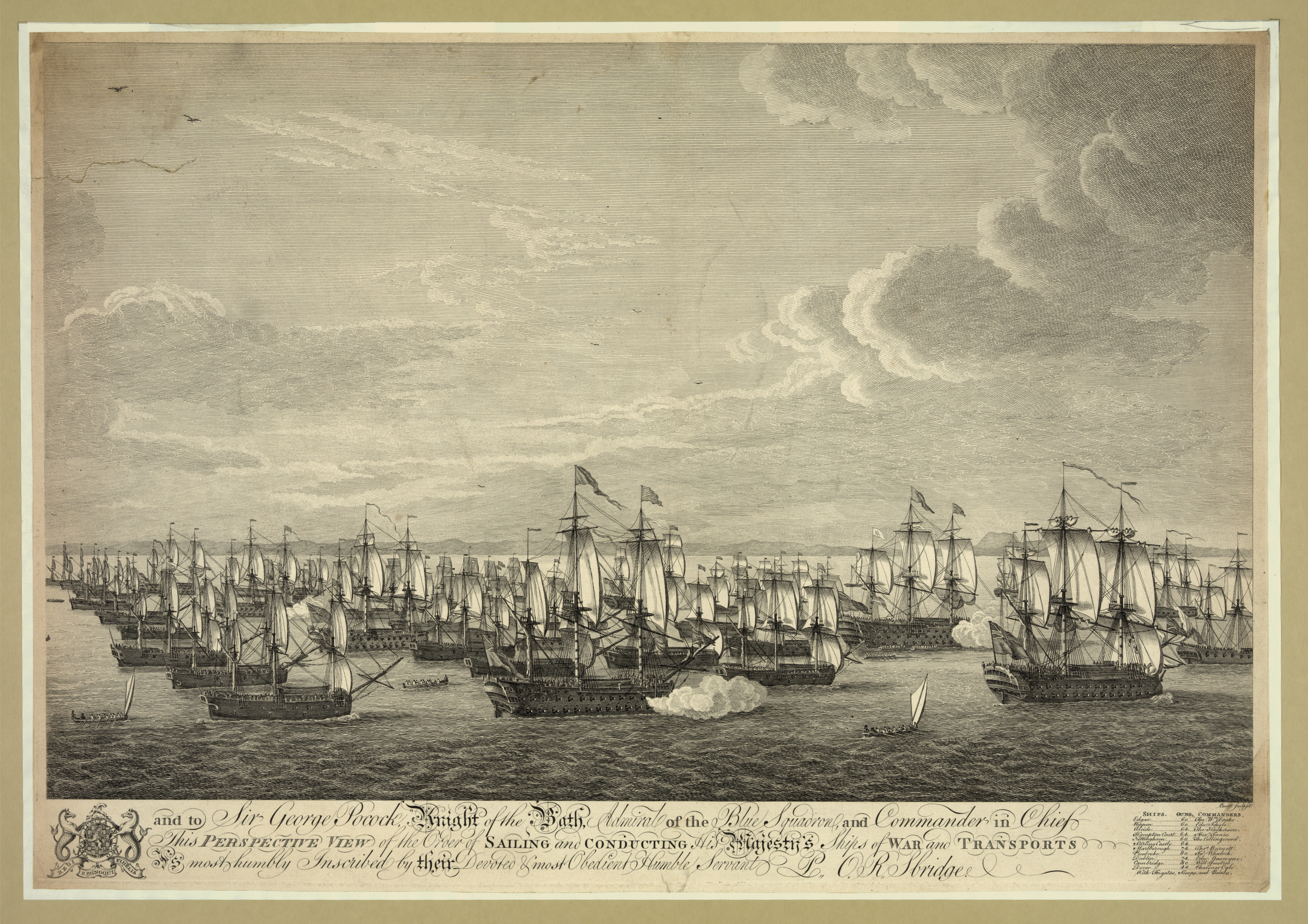
Shown here as a member Sir George Pocock's Blue Squadron, circa 1762
