= HMS Plymouth (1708) =

Ship of the line of the Royal Navy

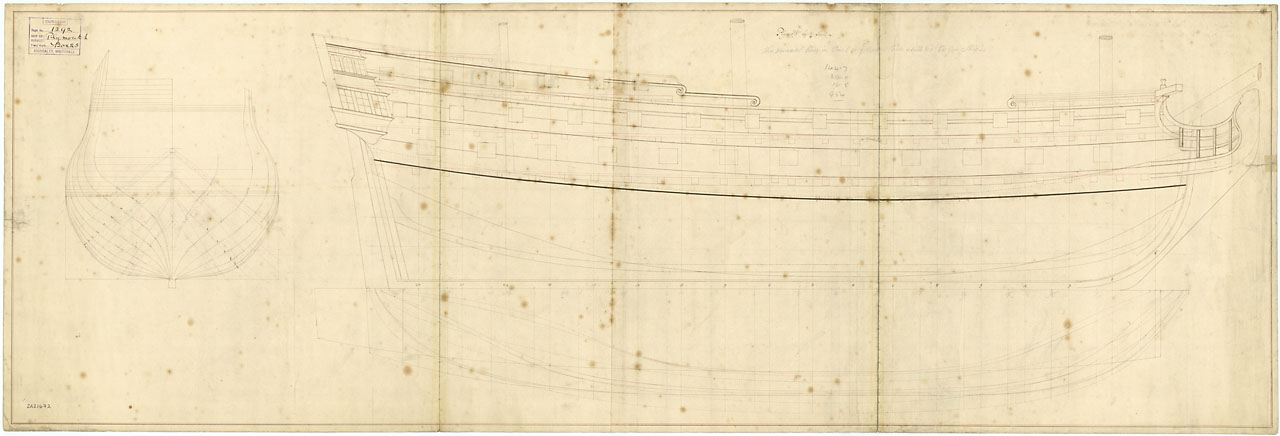
- Plan of the 1722 conversion

History

Great Britain
- Name: HMS Plymouth
- Builder: Lock, Devonport Dockyard (then called Plymouth-Dock)
- Launched: 25 May 1708
- Fate: Broken up, 1764

General characteristics as built
- Class & type: 1706 Establishment 60-gun fourth rate ship of the line
- Tons burthen: 922 (bm)
- Length: 144 ft (43.9 m) (gundeck)
- Beam: 38 ft (11.6 m)
- Depth of hold: 15 ft 8 in (4.8 m)
- Propulsion: Sails
- Sail plan: Full-rigged ship
- Armament: 60 guns: Gundeck (GD): 24 × 24-pounder guns; Upper gundeck (UGD): 26 × 9-pounder guns; QD: 8 × 6-pounder guns; Fc: 2 × 6-pounder guns

General characteristics after 1722 rebuild
- Class & type: 1719 Establishment 60-gun fourth rate ship of the line
- Tons burthen: 954 (bm)
- Length: 144 ft (43.9 m) (gundeck)
- Beam: 39 ft (11.9 m)
- Depth of hold: 16 ft 5 in (5.0 m)
- Propulsion: Sails
- Sail plan: Full-rigged ship
- Armament: 60 guns: GD: 24 × 24-pounder guns; UGD: 26 × 9-pounder guns; QD: 8 × 6-pounder guns; Fc: 2 × 6-pounder guns

HMS Plymouth was a 60-gun fourth rate ship of the line of the Royal Navy, built at Devonport Dockyard (Devonport then known as Plymouth-Dock) to the 1706 Establishment of dimensions, and launched on 25 May 1708.

Orders were issued on 26 May 1720 directing Plymouth to be taken to pieces and rebuilt according to the 1719 Establishment at Chatham, from where she was relaunched on 2 August 1722. Plymouth remained in service until she was broken up in 1764.
