= Nicholas Haddock =

Brritish Royal Navy admiral (1686–1746)

Admiral Nicholas Haddock
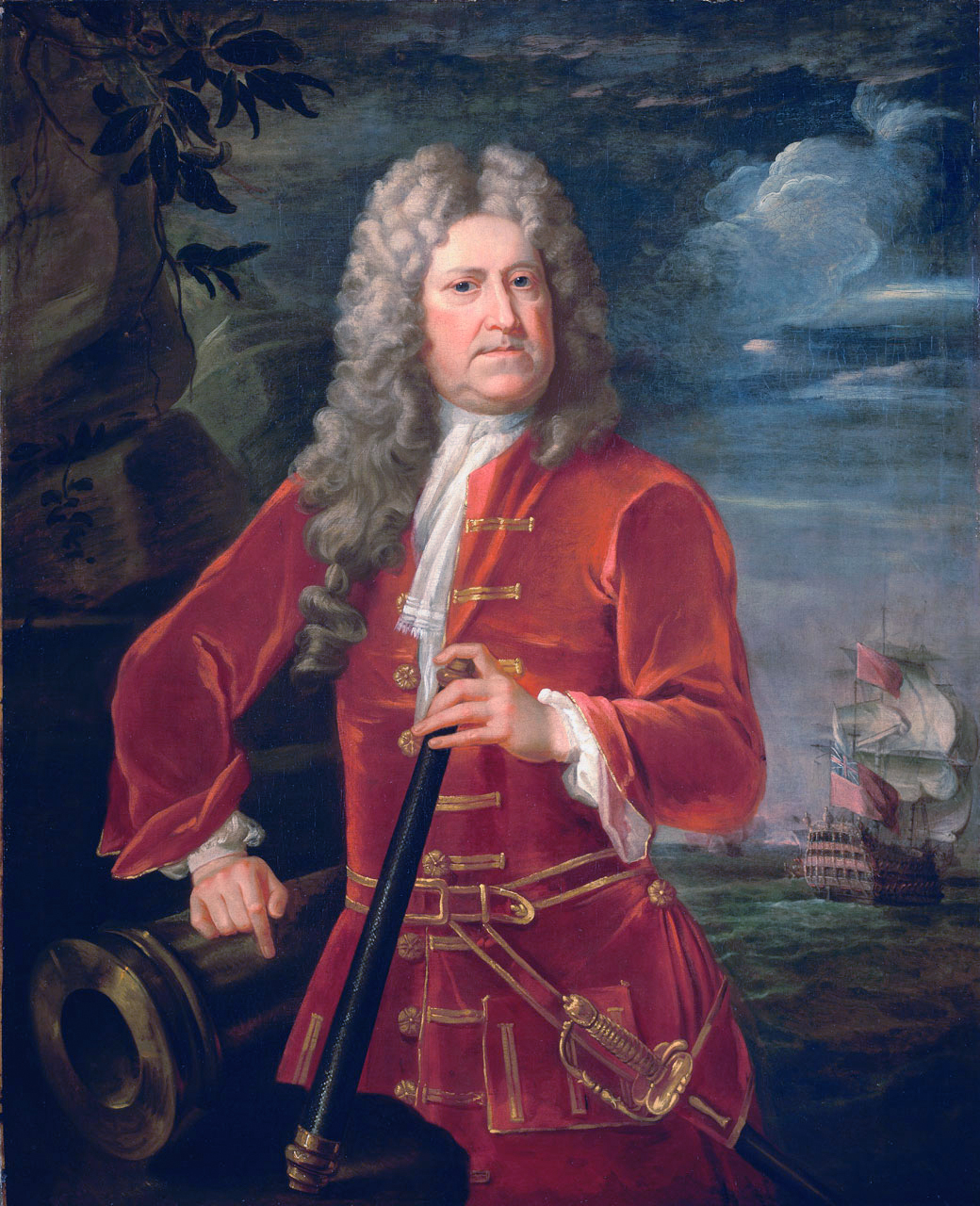
- Nicholas Haddock
- Born: 1686
- Died: 26 September 1746 (aged 59–60); Wrotham Place, Kent
- Military career
- Allegiance: Kingdom of Great Britain
- Branch: Royal Navy
- Service years: 1699–1746
- Rank: Admiral of the Blue
- Commands: Mediterranean Fleet
- Conflicts: War of the Spanish Succession; War of the Quadruple Alliance

Admiral Nicholas Haddock (1686 – 26 September 1746) was an admiral in the Royal Navy and Commander-in-Chief of Britain's naval forces in the Mediterranean between 1738 and 1742. Despite an active and successful early and middle career, his reputation was tarnished in 1740 when he failed to prevent the Spanish and French fleets from combining to support an invasion of Italy. Amid public outcry he was forced to resign his naval responsibilities and return to England, where he fell into a melancholic state.

Haddock never returned to sea. He held public office as the Member of Parliament for Rochester, but there is no record of him attending parliament or casting a vote. He died at Wrotham Place in Kent, in 1746.

== Early life ==
Haddock was born in 1686, the third and youngest son of Sir Richard Haddock, then Controller of the Navy, and his wife Elizabeth. He joined the Royal Navy at thirteen as a volunteer-per-order and was promoted to midshipman three years later. At around this time he also saw his first active service at sea, being present at the Battle of Vigo Bay off Spain in 1702. Promoted to lieutenant, he served at the relief of Barcelona in 1706. On 6 April 1707 he was promoted to the rank of captain and placed in command of the 42-gun fifth-rate HMS Ludlow Castle.

England was at war with France, and Haddock's orders were to hunt for enemy privateers. On 30 December he brought Ludlow Castle into range with two such vessels, Nightingale and Squirrel, both former English merchantmen captured and refitted by the French. Haddock ordered that Ludlow Castle give chase, and was rewarded with the capture of Nightingale. This vessel, Haddock's first prize ship, was returned to England along with her crew. Haddock was also present at the Battle of Cape Passaro off Sicily in 1718; he was Captain of the 70-gun Grafton, and led the attack.

== Later career ==
In 1723 he purchased the estate of Wrotham Place in Kent. In 1732 he was appointed to command of The Nore. He was Commander-in-Chief in the Mediterranean Fleet from 1738 to 1742. After the outbreak of the War of Austrian Succession, with only 10 ships at his disposal, he was unable to prevent the crossing of two Spanish armies from Barcelona to Italy. In November 1741, a Spanish fleet with 14,000 troops sailed to Orbetello and in mid-December, 52 ships carrying almost 12,800 men successfully crossed towards La Spezia. Only with the arrival of additional ships from Britain in February 1742, he was able to successfully blockade the Spanish coast and take valuable prizes including two treasure ships, but failed to force the Spanish fleet into an action. He was recalled from the Mediterranean in December 1741 and succeeded first by Richard Lestock and then Thomas Mathews.

He was promoted to the rank of rear admiral in 1734 and promptly took up a political career, obtaining the Admiralty-controlled rotten borough of Rochester in the elections in that year. Although no longer a serving sea officer he continued to progress through seniority, reaching the rank of vice-admiral in 1744 and Admiral of the Blue in 1744. He remained in Parliament as Member for Rochester until his death in 1746.

His estate, comprising Wrotham Place and a fortune in South Sea and East India Company shares, was inherited by his eldest son Nicholas.

Parliament of Great Britain
Preceded by David Polhill; Admiral John Jennings	Member of Parliament for Rochester; 1734–1746; With: David Polhill 1734–1741; Admiral Edward Vernon 1741–1743; David Polhill 1743–1746	Succeeded by David Polhill; Admiral Sir Chaloner Ogle
