= Cryptogram of Olivier Levasseur =

Cryptogram of 18th-century pirate Olivier Levasseur

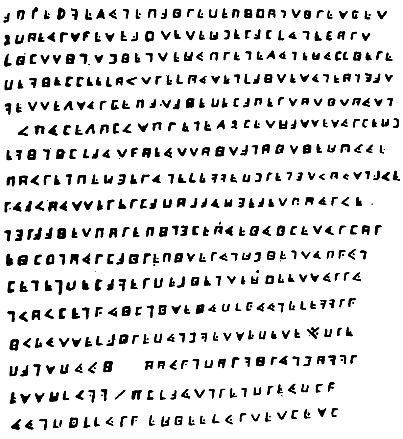
The cryptogram of Olivier Levasseur

The cryptogram of Olivier Levasseur (also known as La Buse cryptogram) is a 17-line pigpen cipher allegedly created by 18th-century French pirate Olivier Levasseur, and first attested by French historian and librarian Charles de La Roncière in his 1934 paperback novel Le Flibustier Mystérieux: Histoire d'un trésor caché.

La Roncière claimed the cryptogram and the treasure to which it purportedly refers originated from a raid on the Portuguese cargo ship Nossa Senhora do Cabo in 1721 by a group of pirates including Levasseur, Jasper Seagar and Captain John Taylor. On board the Nossa Senhora was a large amount of valuable cargo, along with the Viceroy of Goa, who was later released for ransom. With a share of the loot and currency, Levasseur went into hiding for nine years until he was captured in July 1730, when he was executed. A popular legend claims that immediately before his execution, Levasseur threw a piece of paper into the watching crowd and shouted French: "Mes trésors à qui saura comprendre", lit. 'My treasures to those who will know how to understand'. The written cryptogram supposedly ended up in the possession of La Roncière, who then decrypted it in his 1934 novel. Though the 1721 raid of Nossa Senhora by Levasseur and his associates is well attested by historians, no concrete evidence for the treasure's existence has ever been uncovered, despite many searches and investigations, which suggests the cryptogram may have been an invention of La Roncière for his novel.

== Historical background ==
=== Raid of the Nossa Senhora ===
Olivier Levasseur was born in Calais in 1688. Levasseur received a high standard of education in his early life and later became known for being a ruthless and efficient pirate. Receiving a letter of marque from Louis XIV, he became a privateer during the War of the Spanish Succession as a raider of enemy ships in the Caribbean for the French. Early on, Levasseur decided to serve himself rather than his government and began accumulating wealth as a pirate, earning himself the nickname of "La Buse". In 1716, during what is now known as the Golden Age of Piracy, Levasseur, using the alias of Louis de Boure and working with Benjamin Hornigold and Samuel "Black Sam" Bellamy, began to build a reputation as an efficient pirate.

On 8 April 1721, Levasseur, Jasper Seagar and Captain John Taylor, aboard the sailing ships Victory and Cassandra, arrived at the island of Reunion. There they found the Portuguese cargo ship Nossa Senhora do Cabo anchored at Saint-Denis. The masts and two-thirds of the cannons were reportedly missing upon discovery, with the ship damaged in a recent passing storm.

The band of pirates boarded the Nossa Senhora without resistance and allegedly discovered a trove of valuables including gold and silver bars, precious silks and gemstones, spices and furniture collectively valued in the millions of the local currency. Along with the highly valuable treasure, the Nossa Senhora was ferrying Luís de Meneses, 1st Marquis of Louriçal and Viceroy of Goa, en route to Portugal. Before splitting the treasure and going into hiding, the pirates released the viceroy in exchange for a ransom.

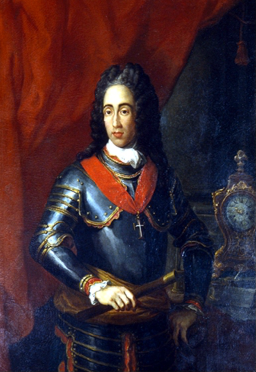
The Viceroy of Goa, Luís de Meneses, 1st Marquis of Louriçal, who was on board the Nossa Senhora at the time of the raid

=== The Fiery Cross of Goa ===
An artifact said to be on board the Nossa Senhora was the golden Fiery Cross of Goa, from the Se Cathedral. Goa is a state on the southwestern coast of India's Konkan region. It was a colony of Portugal from the 16th century until 1961, when it was annexed by India. The Cross itself was described as being as much as seven feet tall and covered with high-value gemstones such as emeralds, rubies and diamonds. Being made of gold, the Cross would have required multiple individuals to carry it. Despite the legend of the Cross existing now, it is not mentioned by name anywhere prior to La Roncière's 1934 novel, which itself does not mention the Cross.

=== Execution of Levasseur ===
Nine years after the Nossa Senhora raid, in 1730, Levasseur was captured and transported to Reunion island by Captain d'Hermitte of the naval vessel La Meduse, (Note: Not to be confused with the French frigate of the same name that sank in 1816.) followed by execution for his crimes. However, the details surrounding what took place leading up to his execution vary by source. The most famous story of Levasseur's execution speaks of him throwing a piece of paper with a 17-line pigpen cipher written on it to the watching crowd. This message is said to encrypt the location of his share of the treasure, stolen during the raid on the Nossa Senhora. As he threw it, Levasseur reportedly shouted French: "Mes trésors à qui saura comprendre", lit. 'My treasures to he who will know how to understand'. Some accounts say that the cryptogram paper was concealed within a necklace, though neither the necklace nor the original paper containing the cryptogram have ever been seen.

== Cryptogram ==
=== The Clavicles of Solomon ===
In 1934, Charles de La Roncière wrote a novel, Le Flibustier Mystérieux: Histoire d'un trésor caché (English: The Mysterious Buccaneer: The Story of a Hidden Treasure), for the Parisian publishing house Le Masque. Written entirely in French, Le Flibustier Mystérieux begins by presenting the idea of The Clavicles of Solomon as a non-fiction cabalistic manual, both authored by and passed down from King Solomon himself to his son Rehoboam ("Roboam" in the novel). A testament left to Rehoboam by King Solomon engraved on the bark of a tree read, French: "J'obtins par surcroît la jouissance de tous les trésors célestes et la connaissance de toutes choses naturelles. C'est, mon fils, par ce moyen que je possède toutes les vertus et richesses dont tu me vois jouir à présent.", lit. 'I also obtained the enjoyment of all heavenly treasures and knowledge of all natural things. It is, my son, by this means that I possess all the virtues and riches which you see me enjoying presently.' La Roncière then draws on poet Edgar Allan Poe's The Gold-Bug, writing that when heated the poetic instruction written in an opaque ink would appear on the parchment, revealing the existence of a hiding place.

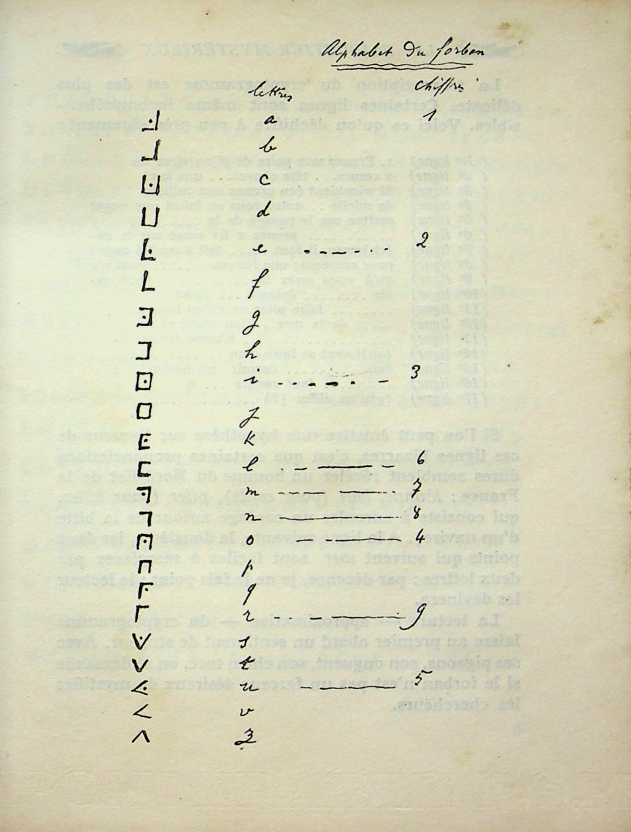
Translation by Charles de La Roncière of Olivier Levasseur's cryptogram signs.

La Roncière then pivots back to The Clavicles of Solomon, introducing a young woman and an island in the Indian Ocean, unnamed so that the treasure remains undiscovered. Three bodies are observed, two in coffins with a ring on the left ear, identifiable as sailors. The young woman is then handed two documents from the landowner, one being a cryptogram, which could only be deciphered by using the characters of The Clavicles of Solomon. The young woman wrote to La Bibliothèque Nationale de France, asking for access to The Clavicles of Solomon. A connection between the cabalistic signs and the signs on Levasseur's cryptogram was assumed, however it is left ambiguous as to whether this was surmised by La Roncière or the young woman. La Roncière presents this in Le Flibustier Mystérieux, with further context provided in his 1941 book Explorateurs et pionniers français.

=== The Cryptogram of Olivier Levasseur ===
The next section of the novel (pages six through twelve), titled French: "Le Cryptogramme Du Forban", lit. 'The Cryptogram of the Privateer', discusses the cryptogram which has come to be attributed to Levasseur's share of the treasure from the 1721 raid on the Nossa Senhora. The sixth page of Le Flibustier Mystérieux provides a description of the written cryptogram symbolage and their attributed values, translated by La Roncière, on the seventh page. La Roncière writes that Levasseur's cryptogram uses handwritten signs, reminiscent of Hebrew letters, each of which represent two letters, known as a digraph. The first of these letters is usually removed, leaving only the second letter readable. Levasseur was not consistent, however; a dozen of the signs translate "indifferently", meaning sometimes the first letter of the digraph is not removed, for example a sign representing "il" may only show as "i" or "l". This may have been due to a difficulty on the part of the encrypter in telling apart certain letters or numbers. Some signs also represent a letter or a number, with no clear distinction, their meaning instead determined by context and placement within the text. Ambiguity plays a deliberate part in the composition of the cryptogram.

=== La Roncière's decryption ===
Pages eight and nine offer an attempted decryption of the cryptogram, written line by line in French on the eighth page and the cryptogram in full presentation on the ninth page. Whilst mostly matching more modern versions, La Roncière's decryption deliberately leaves out certain letters, instead leaving it up to the reader to "guess" the parts that are not filled in. The decryption in Le Flibustier Mystérieux is written as follows:

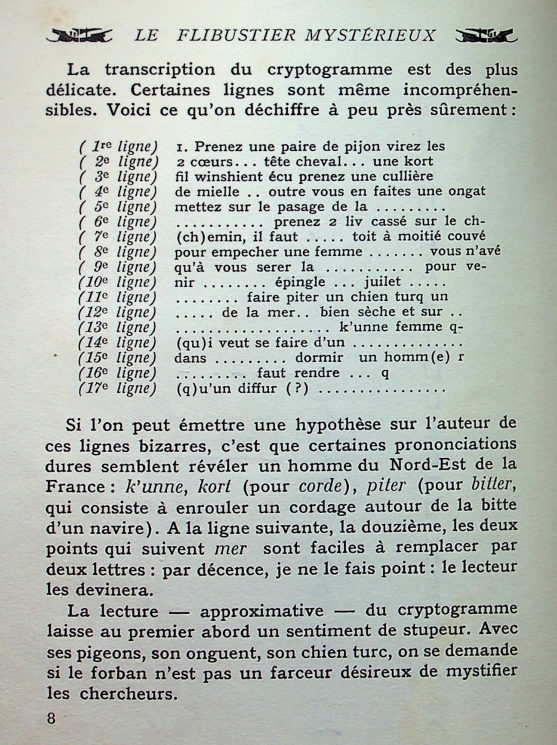
Charles de La Roncière decryption

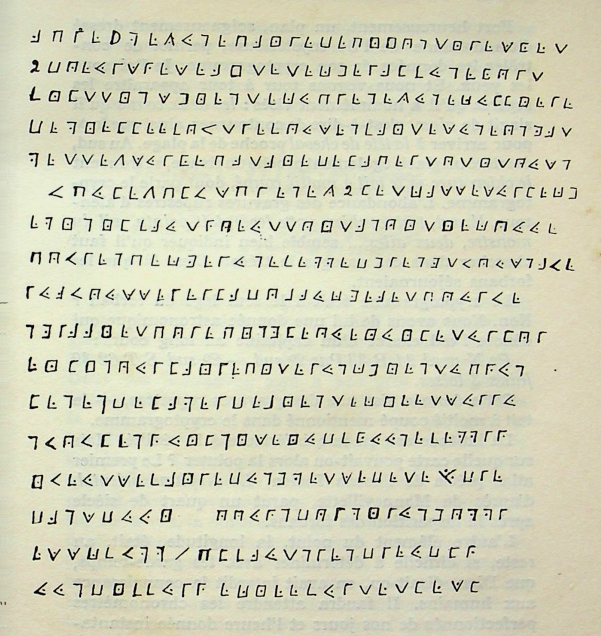
Levasseur's cryptogram

1. I. Prenez une paire de pijon virez les
2. 2 cœurs... tête cheval... une kort
3. fil winshient écu prenez une cullière
4. de mielle .. outre vous en faites une ongat
5. mettez sur le pasage de la .........
6. ........... prenez 2 liv cassé sur le ch-
7. (ch)emin, il faut ..... toit à moitié couvé
8. pour empecher une femme ....... vous n'avé
9. qu'à vous sere la ........... pour ve-
10. nir ........ épingle ... juilet .....
11. ........ faire piter un chien turq un
12. ..... de la mer.. bien sèche et sur
13. ................... k'unne femme q-
14. (qu)i veut se faire d'un ..............
15. dans ......... dormir un homm(e) r
16. ......... faut rendre ... q
17. (q)u'un diffur (?) ..................

From these 17 lines, Le Roncière extrapolates on the words from the decrypted cryptogram, describing them as strange "bizarreries" and hypothesising on who the encrypter could be. He quickly establishes that the encrypter is likely of French origin, specifically the North-East of France, one factor being attributed to the harsh pronunciations of certain words. Both 'kort' (line 2) and 'k'unne' (line 13)—despite neither originating from French—can be derived from French: 'corde', lit. 'rope'. Moreover, 'piter' (line 11) can be synonymised to bitter, which means to roll a rope around the 'bitte' of a ship ('bitt' in English being the nautical post used to secure mooring rope). On the twelfth line, two points following the word French: 'mer', lit. 'sea' are described by La Roncière as being easily replaced. These are not elaborated on, instead being left to the reader to guess.

=== Possible location of Levasseur's treasure ===
Using a drawn map of an island, on page ten La Roncière begins "controlling" the cryptogram's data, matching words to various things that provide "clues" as to the location of Levasseur's treasure. 'Les deux cœurs' meaning 'the two hearts' (line 2) is attributed by La Roncière to a matter of French: "virer", lit. 'drawing', as in 'drawing' meaning 'to arrive' at the French: "tete de cheval", lit. 'the horse head'. La Roncière then mentions a roughly drawn out glacier to the south, where French: "la chien turc", lit. 'a Turkish dog' and French: "le toit à moilié couvé", lit. 'a half-covered roof' (Note: Written as 'coupe' in this paragraph.) are located. Finally La Ronciere lists what he describes as an "abundance of rock engravings" from the surrounding area including a French: "lézard, tortue, chien patte levée, toit pointu, œeil du monstre, deux ailes", lit. 'lizard, turtle, dog with a raised paw, a pointed roof, the eye of a monster, two wings'. Altogether, these excerpts from the cryptogram describe the location of where the privateers stayed.

With this cryptic information extrapolated from the cryptogram, La Roncière questions where this mysterious island could be. He states that they have "astronomical data that denotes the trained eye of a seasoned sea captain", providing the reader with the following data:

'Pr N nord 24 B 39 Pas 2° sud — 2° sud S T 62.39 jaites 3 toises.'

La Roncière attributes this data to one of the cryptogram's aforementioned petroglyphs, the "half-cut roof". The latitude is said not to match, with the exact map plotted questioned also. Reference is made to the first accurate map of the Indian Ocean, published by Jean-Baptiste d'Après de Mannevillette in Le Neptune oriental during the latter half of the 18th century, decades after the privateers disappeared. La Roncière states that longitude was so difficult to determine before the 20th century that God had "forbidden human knowledge of it" and reasons that without the chronometers of the day or instantaneous wireless telegraphy to determine the meridian to within a few metres (consequently verifying geologist Alfred Wegener's hypothesis on continental drift), locating the treasure using the intersection of latitude and longitude would be an "illusory investigation". Instead, on page eleven, La Roncière uses a rebus to attempt further placement of the treasure:

'P^{r} I^{er} pas^{se} avec p^{re} de pqtx
En prendre L 2 V L f S N I C^{lot} de même
Et de L S^{ce} E f^{re} l^{a} ge Cm Io gat L m^{e}
Sur 1'0 : pge de la source
p^{r} I h^{2} 8 C^{a} ghe p^{s0} pour L ch de la M^{e}
B^{n} ghe L frote C^{tre} la p^{se} S^{rd} g L V t q^{e}
p^{ser} cher S f^{re} X d l^{de} L D g^{lo} D L^{o}
D du C^{ble} du C^{eur}.'

French: "La plage de la source", lit. 'The beach at the source' is indicated to be a spring near the sea, located within the estate of the aforementioned landowner, who allegedly passed Levasseur's documents to the young woman. Unfortunately, the "ingenious" explanation given by the landowner to La Roncière for the petroglyphs is not shared with the reader out of discretion. The French: "C^{ble} du C^{eur}", lit. 'cable of the heart' is also mentioned by La Roncière, "cable" being interpreted as a measurement of length meaning height, and "heart" meaning a person in control. Put together, "cable of the heart" could refer to "height of the Commander". Another interpretation is that "the heart" could be interpreted as "the Curator", a title held by a French pirate leader. Both of these conclusions are left open-ended for the reader's deliberation. La Roncière adds further context to the reading of "the Commander", which he says is understood to mean the foreman of enslaved Africans (described in the novel as "Negroes"). La Roncière attributes this to the historical English pirate Henry Every, (Note: Referred to as "John Avery" in Le Flibustier Mystérieux.) who owned a number of slaves, and whom the latter half of the novel focuses on.

== Search attempts ==
=== Reginald Cruise-Wilkins and Savy family's search at Bel Ombre ===
During the 19th century, the Savy family of Mahé, Seychelles, came into possession of Levasseur's papers. The information they extracted from the papers led them to Bel Ombre, Mauritius. Here, at the National Archives of Mauritius, they discovered other scarcely seen papers containing Levasseur's cryptogram. From 1913 onwards, the Savy family excavated the beach at Bel Ombre. It was during this time that an unidentified cryptographer studied the cryptogram finding no solution until Charles de La Roncière's publication in 1934. Fourteen years later in 1948, former King's Guard and Kenyan settler Reginald Cruise-Wilkins visited Seychelles during a holiday. Unable to return home until another boat departed three months later, he chose to reside at Bel Ombre. Cruise-Wilkins was shown Levasseur's cryptogram by Mrs Charles Savy of the Savy family and the unidentified cryptographer. Using the information they had learned, along with the petroglyph identifiers from La Roncière's work, Cruise-Wilkins became set on finding Levasseur's treasure, which he believed was located under the beach at Bel Ombre.

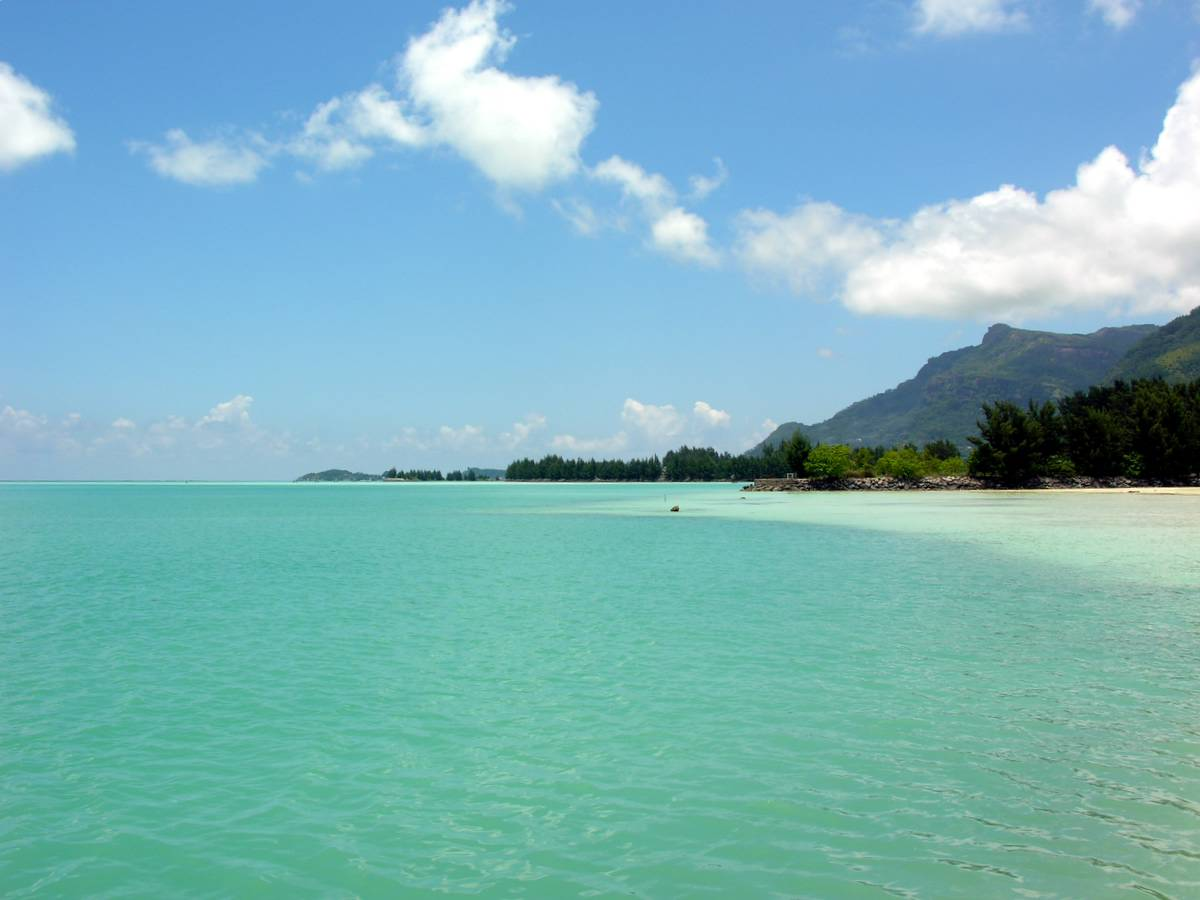
A beach located on the island of Mahé, Seychelles

In 1949, Cruise-Wilkins enlisted the help of retired Indian Army officer Colonel D. M. Hennessey, after seeing an advert by him in a local paper offering services for water divination. After a year, they were unable to locate anything of note. From 1951 to 1955, Cruise-Wilkins continued to dig under a giant rock he named "the glacis", funded by an investment from the Government of Seychelles. Previously having funded the search himself and with help from his mother, by 1955 Cruise-Wilkins had run out of money. Under Kenyan accounting firm Gill and Johnson, he managed to secure £24,000 from 400 shareholders, each of whom would receive a share of his percentage (with the other divisions going to the Seychelles Government) should the treasure be discovered. The prospectus was subsequently authorised. Returning to Bel Ombre, Cruise-Wilkins continued to search, with updates being provided to shareholders in Kenya by Colonel J. Kent, an arrangement which ended in 1957. Reginald Cruise-Wilkins continued to search for Levasseur's treasure at Bel Ombre until his death in 1977.

=== Continued searches by John Cruise-Wilkins and Robert Graf ===
Reginald Cruise-Wilkins' son John continued the search in 1988 after obtaining the required permits from the government. Carrying on in the same area of Bel Ombre, John Cruise-Wilkins used modern equipment including pumps, drills, jackhammers, excavators and blasting, along with hand tools where necessary. Four years prior to resuming the search, former US Air Force technical instructor Robert Graf moved to Mahé and joined the project, contributing both to funding and locating the treasure. Graf and Cruise-Wilkins broke off to search in different locations after four years of searching. During the 1990s and early 2000s, they alternated licensing periods to expand the search further. By comparing markings on the rocks at Mahé, Graf was able to construct a lagoon, furthering his excavation between Cruise-Wilkins' search periods. Twelve petroglyphs located by Graf were interpreted as aligning with specific comments in Levasseur's papers, with one photo revealing a sequence of holes mirroring a constellation referred to in Levasseur's writings. Prior to this, the number 62 was found to be referenced in Levasseur's papers, matching a domino game piece found by Cruise-Wilkins, with handmade inlays showing a six and two close to where Graf was searching at the time. Graf and Cruise-Wilkins continued their excavation work on alternating licenses until 2009, at which point the Government of Seychelles mandated that a 250,000 Seychellois rupee licence fee must be fulfilled to be able to continue the search.

== Authenticity ==
=== Of historical events ===
Many sources on the subject exercise some degree of poetic license by mixing fictional events with people and events that did exist, which makes it difficult to validate what is and is not true. It is generally accepted by historians that Olivier Levasseur likely partook in the 1721 raid on the Nossa Senhora, which at the time was indeed transporting the Viceroy of Goa. Whilst a large amount of high-value "treasure" was taken by Levasseur and his associates, it is understood that much of his associates' shares were given to Spanish Portobelo in return for amnesty for the crime. The Fiery Cross of Goa is believed to be part of the legend as attested to in La Roncière's novel, with cynicism given to treasure hunters who continue to search for it today. According to some sources, Levasseur reportedly kept his share. In 1730, when Levasseur was captured, many sources suggest he threw a piece of paper into the crowd, although this claim is not present in contemporary literature. This part of the legend is generally considered to have been fabricated within Le Flibustier Mystérieux by Charles de La Roncière, who admitted within his novel that he did not like the governor's version of Levasseur's execution, instead preferring the version with the cryptogram.

=== Of the cryptogram ===
Levasseur's cryptogram is generally agreed to have originated within La Roncière's novel Le Flibustier Mystérieux. All publications discussing the cryptogram after this novel refer back to La Roncière's writings and no mention of a manuscript containing a cryptogram is known to have existed before this. The novel's publishing house La Masque was known for publishing fictional works and satire, and it is likely La Roncière would have chosen a different publisher if he intended the novel to be a genuine historical work of non-fiction. It has also been questioned why a notable historian such as La Roncière would publish a novel about a cryptogram where no evidence exists linking it to Levasseur directly. It is possible a document was shown to La Roncière which was then attributed to Levasseur, though no physical evidence for this has ever surfaced. Robert Charroux's 1962 book Treasures of the World introduced Mrs Savy, descendant and inheritor of the pirate Nageon de L'Estang. Unfortunately, no direct evidence of a document containing the cryptogram being passed from the Savy family to La Roncière has ever been found to exist. Charroux's publications are known to be questionable, and no information regarding where this information was obtained is known. This leaves the origin of Levasseur's cryptogram a likely invention of 20th-century fiction.
