= Cotinga Island =

Island located off the coast of Rio de Janeiro state, Brazil

Native name: Ilha da Cotinga
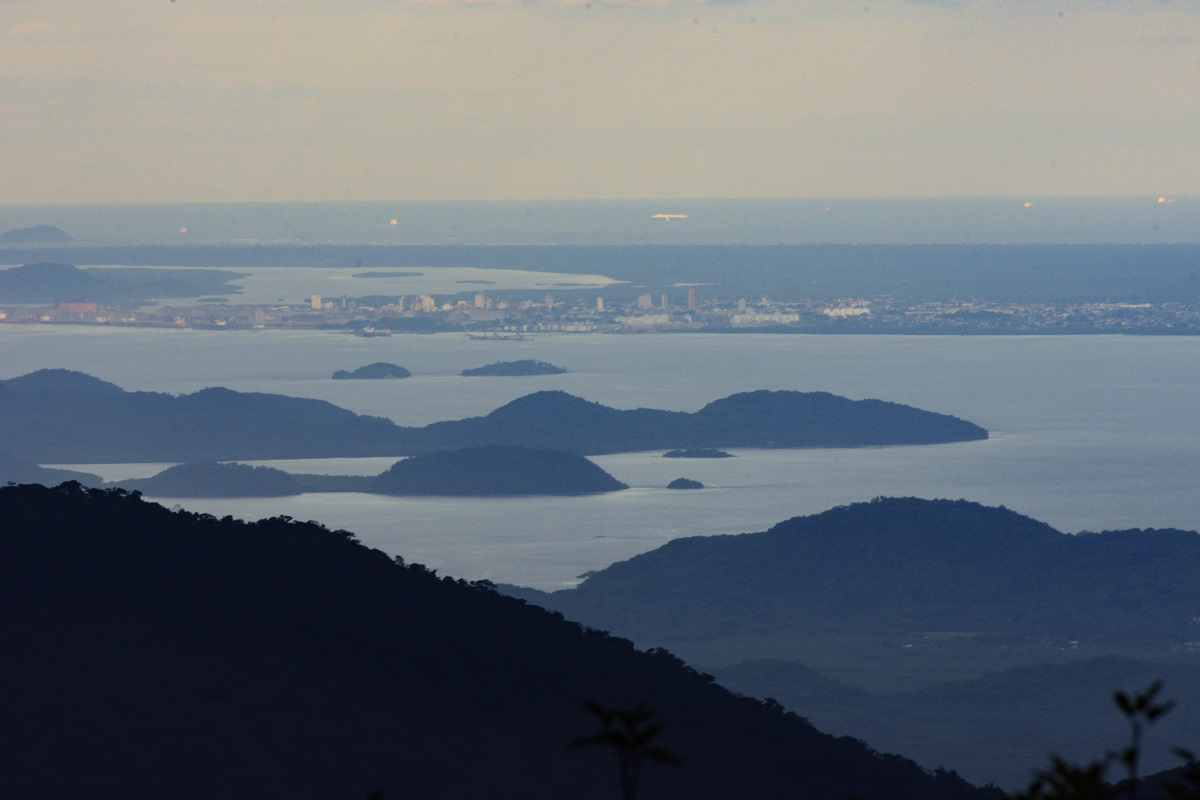
- View of the Bay of Paranaguá and Ilha da Cotinga.
- Interactive map of Cotinga Island

Geography
- Location: Atlantic Ocean
- Coordinates: 25.527°S 48.456°W

Administration
- Brazil
- Municipality: Paranaguá
- State: Paraná (state)

Ilha da Cotinga is an island in Paranaguá Bay near the city of Paranaguá, Paraná, Brazil. It is only accessible by boat. It is considered the first territory of Paraná to have been inhabited by European settlers. Settlers wanted to reach the mainland but began by settling the island out of fear of the Indigenous Guaraní peoples, who dominated the region.

The island is a tourist attraction, where remnants and ruins of the early days of the settlement of Paraná can be found. The local indigenous population, the Mbyá Guaraní, still live on the island.

== History ==
In 1677 the Igreja da Nossa Senhora das Mercês (Church of our Lady of Mercies) was built. It was demolished in 1699 so that its building materials could be reused to build the Church of Saint Benedito on the mainland.

On 9 March 1718, the pirate ship La Louise, captained by French pirate Olivier Levasseur, sank during a storm off Cotinga Island.

In 1955, there were requests to rebuild the old hermitage on the site and on 17 May of that year, a maritime procession was held to bring the ancient image of Our Lady of Mercies, which had been sculpted in rock from Portugal, to the site. In 1994, the hermitage was finally rebuilt and inaugurated on 25 April. Access to the hermitage is made via a rustic stone stairway with approximately 365 steps. It has a view of the city and the sea.

== See also ==
- Paranaguá
- History of Paraná
