= Edward England =

Irish pirate (c. 1685 – 1721)

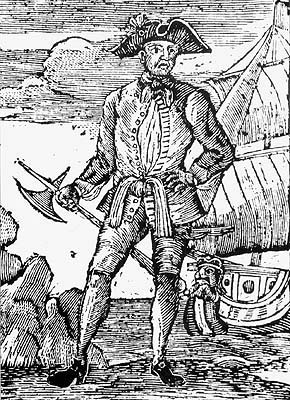
- An 18th century woodcut of England
- Born: c. 1685; Kingdom of Ireland
- Died: 1720/21 (aged approximately 36); St. Augustine's Bay, Fiherenana, Madagascar
- Piratical career
- Nickname: Ned
- Type: Pirate; Former privateer
- Allegiance: Kingdom of Great Britain (War of the Spanish Succession)
- Rank: Captain
- Base of operations: Southern Africa
- Commands: Several vessels, most famously the Royal James and the Fancy.
- Battles: Battle with the Cassandra that caused his crew to mutiny and maroon him for sparing some captives.
- Wealth: R 10,000,000

Edward England's flag, described by the East India Company as "flying a black flag with a skull and crossed bones at the main".

Edward England (c. 1685–1721) was an Irish pirate. The ships he sailed on included the Pearl (which he renamed The Royal James) and later the Fancy, for which England exchanged the Pearl in 1720. His flag was the classic Jolly Roger — almost exactly as the one Samuel Bellamy used — with a human skull facing forward above two crossed bones on a black background. Like Bellamy, England was known for his kindness and compassion as a leader, unlike many other pirates of the time.

He took part in Henry Jennings' expedition for the sunken 1715 Treasure Fleet off the coast of Florida, and then began sailing with Charles Vane in 1718. Upon Vane and other prominent pirates accepting the King's Pardon, England and some of his men sailed for Africa. Along his way he spawned the career of Bartholomew Roberts, among others. In 1720, near the African island of Comoros, England and his men got into a violent conflict with James Macrae. After 10 days of hiding on an island, England and Macrae agreed to a peace deal, upsetting England's crew; he was subsequently voted out as captain and marooned on the island of Mauritius. After four months, England and the loyal crewmen that had been stranded with him managed to build a boat and sail to a pirate safe haven in Madagascar. He died sometime in the winter of 1720–21, possibly from tropical disease.

== Early life ==
Born in Ireland sometime around 1685, he was probably raised a Catholic, and was said to be an educated man. Occasionally referred to in some sources as "Edward Seegar" (or born as Seegar before changing his name to England), other sources and witnesses confirm "Seegar" was not England's name at all, but was instead a separate pirate (Jasper Seagar) who sailed under England. England made his way to Jamaica and during the War of the Spanish Succession he served as a privateer. He was captured by the pirate captain Christopher Winter and forced to join the crew. Winter took England to the pirate base on Nassau, Bahamas. England took part in Henry Jennings' assault on the Spanish salvage camp at Palma de Ayz, Florida, stealing £87,000 in gold and silver. England is next reported as Charles Vane's quartermaster, in March 1718. Vane's sloop, the Lark, was captured by the Royal Navy, but England and the rest of the crew were released to induce the other pirates of Nassau to accept the King's pardon.

== Captaincy – Coast of Africa ==
England was granted captaincy of his own ship in mid-1718. England decided not to accept the pardon along with Vane and a few others, and after the arrival of Woodes Rogers, they set sail for the coast of Africa.

Along the way, he and the crew took several ships. One of the ships was the Cadogan from Bristol, captained by a man named Skinner. Some of England's crew knew Skinner and recognized him instantly because he never paid them for their work previously. According to Charles Johnson, the crew member said:

Ah! Captain Skinner is it you, I am much in your debt, and now I shall pay you in your own coin.

A group of pirates next grabbed the captain, tied him to the windlass and threw empty bottles at him. Next, because he had been a good master to his men they gave him a quick death by simply shooting him in the head with a flintlock pistol. Given the crew of the Cadogan was without a captain, England offered them a choice to join his crew. Aboard the crew was Howell Davis who refused to sign the articles of the pirates. Howell said he would rather die than become a pirate, however, England refused to kill him and instead gave command of the captured ship to Davis. This began the start of Davis' pirate career. Davis would go on to spawn the career of Bartholomew Roberts as well, and the careers of many other pirates.

After some time, England and his crew captured a larger brig or frigate named the Pearl. Taking the ship as their own, they renamed it the Royal James (after James Stuart, alluding to the Jacobitism of England or his crew) and in the spring of 1719 went off in search of plunder in Africa. Between the Gambia River and the Cape Coast, the pirates seized and looted ten ships. Two of these they kept as prizes, granting them to Captains Robert Lane and Richard Sample, who left England to sail for the Caribbean. After looting the ten ships, England made John Taylor the captain of his next prize, the Victory. After looting two additional ships, England and the crew decided to make port in a small African town. However, the pirates grew increasingly belligerent and conflicts arose with the locals over the treatment of women. Soon a fight broke out, resulting in the pirates burning the entire town and departing.

== Indian Ocean ==
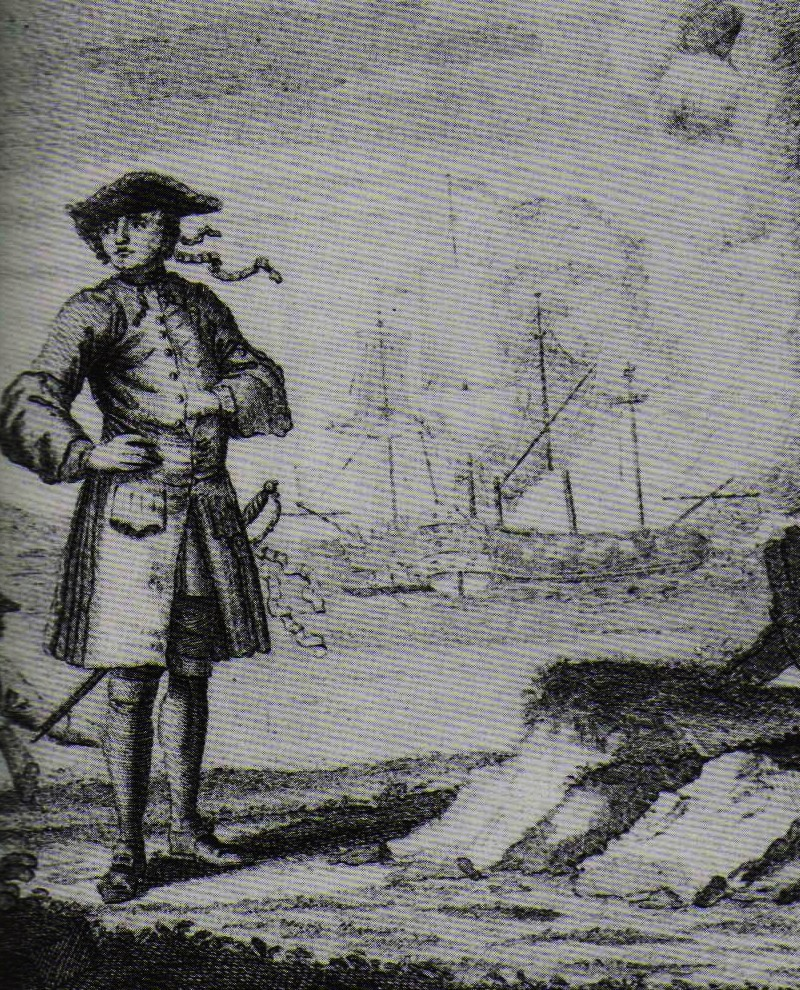
An engraving depicting the pirate Edward England with, in the background, the fight of the Fancy (left) and the Cassandra.

By 1720, England had reached the Indian Ocean, where he met with fellow pirate Captain Oliver la Buse. England captured a thirty-four gun Dutch ship, which he named Fancy in honour of English pirate Henry Every, and he made the Fancy his new flagship. England decided to attack an East Indiaman under the command of James Macrae, the Cassandra, near the island of Comoros. A long and bloody battle ensued, and both ships ran aground. Macrae and his surviving crew escaped and hid on the island for ten days. Finally Macrae, who was injured, tired, and hungry, went aboard England's consort the Victory, hoping for mercy, and surrendered to the pirates. The cargo of the Cassandra was valued at £75,000. Ninety of the Fancy's crew died in the attack on the Cassandra. England had a good nature and unusual kindness, in that he did not believe in torturing captives unless they could not otherwise be persuaded. England ordered Macrae's life spared, and the pirates kept the Cassandra and gave the heavily damaged Fancy to Macrae. England's quartermaster, John Taylor, who was now captain of the Victory, resented this choice, and only agreed after England got him drunk. England then captured a small English ship near Cochin, the drunk captain reporting a false rumour that Macrae was preparing a fleet to chase the pirates. This enraged the pirates, particularly Taylor, who had wanted to kill Macrae. Around this time, Taylor organised a vote to remove England from command. The new captain – a former member of the Fancy crew named Jasper Seagar – marooned England and three others on the coast of Mauritius, before taking Cassandra and Victory north in the hunt for more prizes. Seagar died in 1721, with Cassandra eventually passing to Taylor who took her to the Caribbean.

== Marooning in Mauritius ==
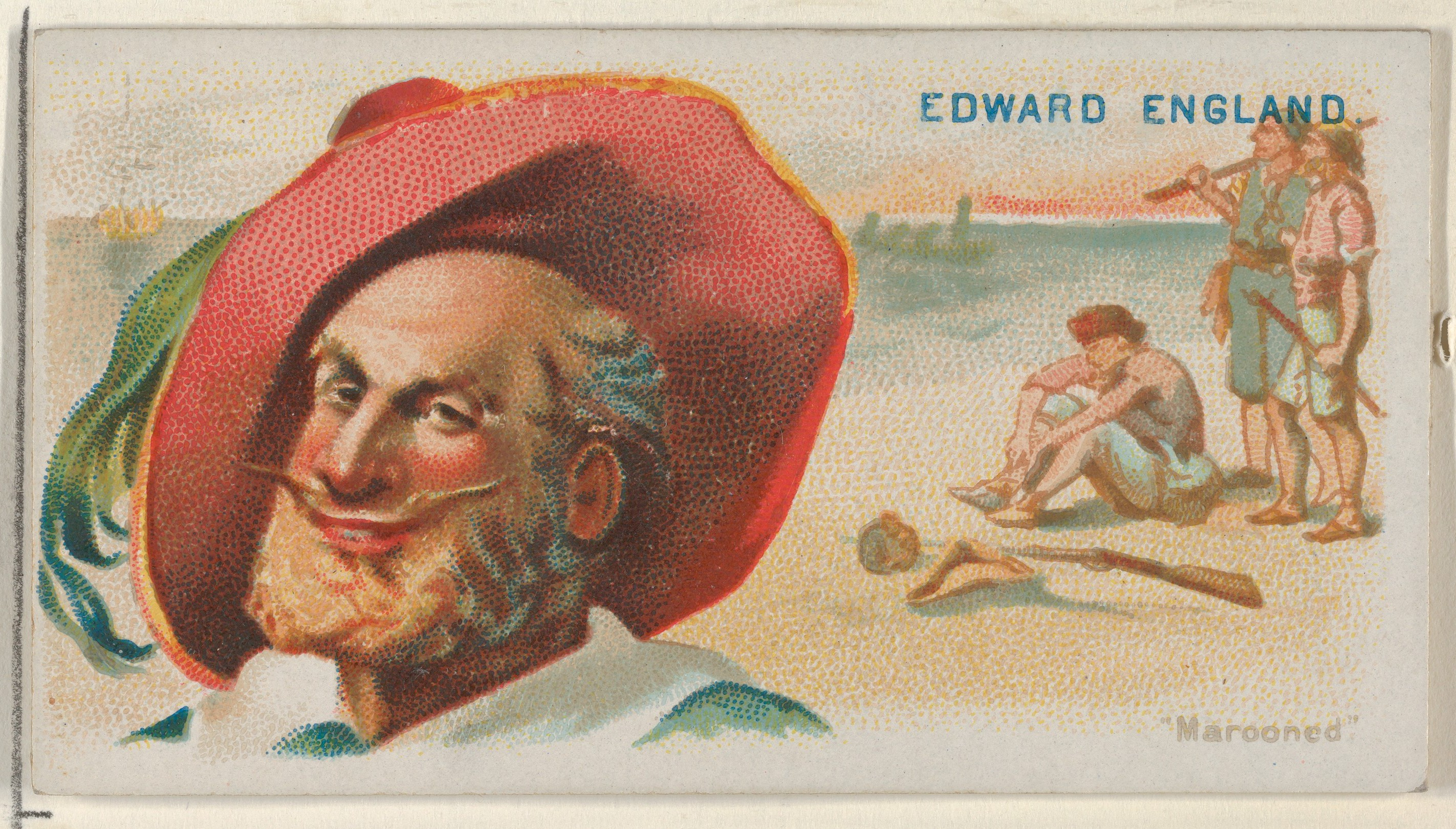
Edward England, marooned, from the Pirates of the Spanish Main series (N19) for Allen & Ginter Cigarettes MET DP835029

England and his three companions were put ashore without adequate provisions, and were forced to scavenge. After about four months, the men built a small boat and managed to sail to the pirate haven of St. Augustine's Bay in Madagascar.

== Legacy ==
After arriving at St. Augustine's Bay, England survived for a while on the charity of other pirates, possibly some of Henry Every's old crew. He died in late 1720 or early 1721, possibly from a tropical disease.

England's son John eventually did as his father had wished and named his son John as well. This tradition continued among England's descendants.

Edward England is known today as one of the more humane pirate captains of the Golden Age of Piracy. According to Captain Charles Johnson,

He had a great deal of good Nature, and did not want for Courage; he was not avaritious, and always averse to the ill Usage of Prisoners received : He would have been contented with moderate Plunder, and less mischievous Pranks, could his Companions have been brought to the same Temper, but he was generally over-rul'd, and as he was engaged in that abominable Society, he was obliged to be a Partner in all their vile Actions.

England is mentioned in Robert Louis Stevenson’s Treasure Island as a previous owner of Long John Silver’s parrot, “Captain Flint”, named for another previous owner.
