= Olivier Levasseur =

French pirate (c. 1689 – 1730)

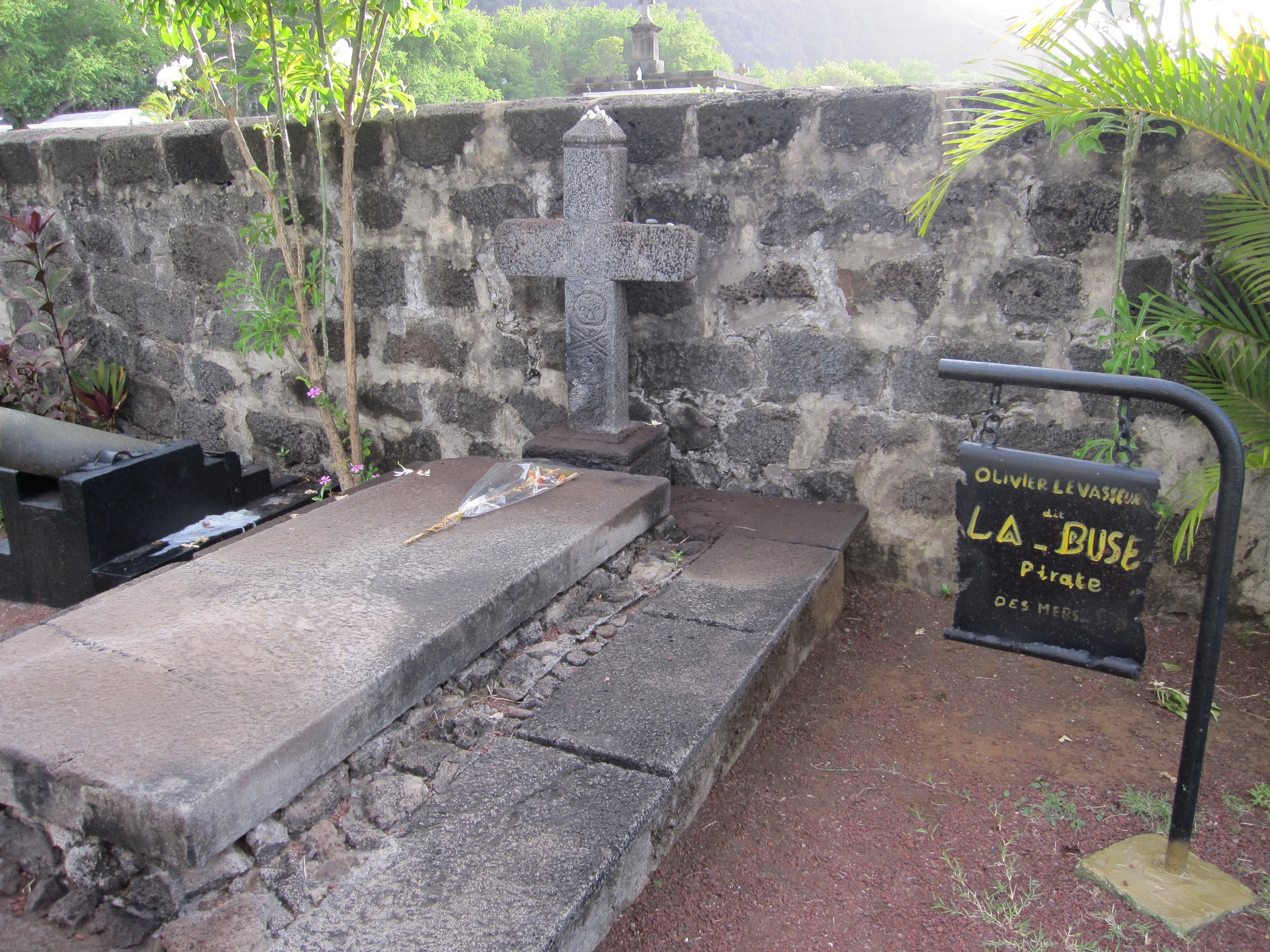
- Gravestone traditionally attributed to La Buse (Olivier Levasseur) in Saint-Paul, Reunion
- Born: Olivier Levasseur c. 1689; Calais, France
- Died: 7 July 1730 (aged 40–42); Saint-Paul, Réunion
- Cause of death: Hanging
- Piratical career
- Nickname: La Buse, La Bouche
- Years active: 1716–1724
- Rank: Captain
- Base of operations: West Indies; Indian Ocean
- Battles: War of the Spanish Succession

Olivier Levasseur (1688, 1689, or 1690 – 7 July 1730), was a French pirate, nicknamed La Buse ("The Buzzard") or La Bouche ("The Mouth") or (Portuguese: O Falcão) in his early days for the speed and ruthlessness with which he always attacked his enemies as well as his ability to verbally attack his opponents. He is known for his involvement in the Nossa Senhora Do Cabo heist, among the richest plunders in the Golden Age of Piracy, and for a myth concerning buried treasure and a cryptogram.

== Biography ==
Born at Calais during the Nine Years' War (1688–1697) to a wealthy bourgeois family, Levasseur became an architect after receiving an excellent education. During the War of the Spanish Succession (1701–1714), he procured a letter of marque from King Louis XIV and became a privateer for the French crown. When the war ended he was ordered to return home with his ship, but he instead joined the pirate company of Benjamin Hornigold in 1716. Though he already had a scar across one eye limiting his sight, Levasseur proved himself a good leader and shipmate.

After a year of successful looting, the Hornigold party split, Levasseur partnering briefly with Samuel Bellamy before deciding to try his luck on the Brazilian Coast aboard a stolen 22-gun merchant frigate named La Louise. He attacked many boats and ships on his way to the south of Brazil, most notably a slave ship coming from Angola, whose crew was abandoned to sink in their ship after it was robbed and damaged. He then abandoned 240 stolen slaves on an island off Macaé (next to Rio de Janeiro) before a Portuguese armed boat gave him chase. After skirmishes with the Portuguese at Ilha Grande and Ubatuba, where ten pirates were killed, La Louise took shelter in Cananéia for some days. There Levasseur was informed of a rich French merchantman in the nearby bay of Paranaguá. While giving it chase, La Louise was caught in a storm off Cotinga Island and sank on 9 March 1718, with the death of about 80 of its crew. Levasseur escaped on a small brigantine that escorted his ship, and from there went south to São Francisco do Sul, where he robbed a boat full of cassava flour, in order to feed his surviving crew, sailing back to Cananéia.

The pirates then sailed further north preying on ships again. Levasseur later reappeared in the Caribbean in June of that year in a smaller vessel that he had managed to steal on his way back from Brazil, but was almost captured by HMS Scarborough under the command of Captain Hume, and fled with much of his valuables to the Caribbean area in a smaller sloop. He later joined his former associates. After William Moody was ejected from command by his disgruntled crew in late 1718, they elected Levasseur as captain in Moody's place. In 1719, he operated together with Howell Davis and Thomas Cocklyn (who had also served under Moody) for a time. In 1720, they attacked the slaver port of Ouidah, Kingdom of Whydah (on the coast of what is now Benin), reducing the local fortress to ruins. Later that year, he was shipwrecked in the Mozambique Channel and stranded on the island of Anjouan in the Comoros. His bad eye had become completely blind by now, so he started wearing an eyepatch.

From 1720 onwards, Levasseur launched his raids from a base on the island of Sainte-Marie, just off the coast of Madagascar, together with pirates John Taylor, Jasper Seagar, and Edward England. The Great Mughal's heavily armed but also heavily laden pilgrim ships to Mecca sailed these seas. Levasseur's quartermaster at this time was Paulsgrave Williams, who had been Bellamy's quartermaster and fellow captain until Bellamy was killed in a storm off Cape Cod. They first plundered the Laccadives, and sold the loot to Dutch traders for $75,000. Levasseur and Taylor eventually got tired of England's humanity and marooned him on the island of Mauritius.

They then perpetrated one of piracy's greatest exploits: the capture of the Portuguese great galleon Nossa Senhora do Cabo (Our Lady of the Cape) or Virgem Do Cabo (The Virgin of the Cape), which was loaded full of treasures belonging to the Bishop of Goa, the Patriarch of the East Indies, and the Viceroy of Portugal, who were both on board returning home to Lisbon. The pirates were able to board the vessel without firing a single broadside because the Cabo had been damaged in a storm; to avoid capsizing the crew had dumped all 72 cannons overboard, then anchored off Réunion island to undergo repairs. (This incident would later be used by Robert Louis Stevenson in his novel Treasure Island, in which the galleon is referred to as The Viceroy of the Indies in the account given by his famed fictional character Long John Silver.)

The booty consisted of bars of gold and silver, dozens of boxes full of golden Guineas, diamonds, pearls, silk, art, and religious objects from the Se Cathedral in Goa, including the Fiery Cross of Goa, made of pure gold and inlaid with diamonds, rubies, and emeralds. It was so heavy that it required three men to carry it to Levasseur's ship. In fact, the treasure was so huge that the pirates did not bother to rob the persons of the ship's passengers, something they normally would have done.

When the loot was divided, each pirate received at least $50,000 worth of golden Guineas, as well as 42 diamonds each. Seagar died when they sailed to Madagascar to divide their take; Levasseur and Taylor split the remaining gold, silver, and other objects, with Levasseur taking the golden cross.

In 1724, Levasseur sent a negotiator to the governor on the island of Bourbon (present-day Reunion island) to discuss an amnesty that had been offered to all pirates in the Indian Ocean who would give up their practice. However, the French government wanted a large part of the stolen loot back, so Levasseur decided to avoid the amnesty and settled down in secret on the Seychelles archipelago. Eventually he was captured near Fort Dauphin, Madagascar. He was then taken to Saint-Denis, Reunion, and hanged for piracy at 5 PM on 7 July 1730.

== The treasure ==
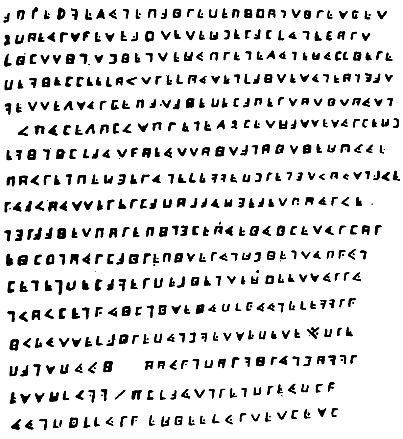
The Cryptogram of Olivier Levasseur

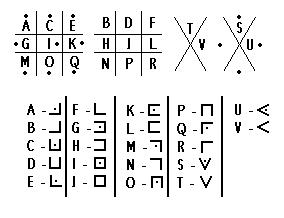
Alphabet of Olivier Levasseur

=== Discovery in the French archives ===
At the beginning of the 20th century, Charles de La Roncière, a renowned historian on the French navy and curator of the Department of Printed Documents at the Bibliothèque nationale de France, declared in an interview he gave to the Milwaukee Journal on 15 July 1934 that he had helped to study a cryptogram that he acknowledged to be from the 18th century.

This cryptogram belonged to a young woman whose name he did not give (we now know, according to Robert Charroux, that it was Mme Savy, originally from the Seychelles). She is said to have asked for a work called the Clavicles of Solomon. Its deciphering yielded nothing conclusive, but launched a treasure hunt that continues to this day. The treasure story is almost certainly fictional, yet this has not dissuaded many from searching.

According to myth, when Levasseur stood on the scaffold to be hanged, he wore a necklace containing a cryptogram of 17 lines, which he threw into the crowd while exclaiming, "Find my treasure, the one who may understand it!" The necklace has been lost, but treasure hunters have since tried to decode the cryptogram, hoping its solution will lead to a treasure.

=== Treasure hunters ===
On Reunion island, the French treasure hunter and picturesque island figure Joseph Tipveau nicknamed Bibique spent part of his life searching for treasure on the west coast of the island, before finally turning his search towards the south of the island, near the Ango ravine.

On the island of Rodrigues, French 2008 Nobel Prize in Literature J. M. G. Le Clézio's paternal grandfather settled down and spent twenty years digging in a gully.

In 1947, Englishman Reginald Cruise-Wilkins studied the documents, but the cryptogram was more difficult to solve than first believed. Cruise-Wilkins' early writing indicates that the code may be based on Masonic symbolism. Cruise-Wilkins claimed to have discovered a connection with the Zodiac, the Clavicles of Solomon, and the Twelve Labours of Hercules. Various tasks, representing the Labours of Hercules, had to be undertaken in strict order. The treasure chamber is somewhere underground and must be approached carefully, to avoid being flooded. It is protected by the tides, which requires damming to hold them back, and is to be approached from the north.

Until his death at Réunion, Cruise-Wilkins sought and dug in the island of Mahé. In a cave, except for old guns, coins, and pirate sarcophagi, he did not find anything. He died on 3 May 1977 before being able to find the treasure. His son, Seychellois history teacher John Cruise-Wilkins, is currently still seeking the treasure, concluding that after using state-of-the-art equipment, he needs "to go back to the old method, [getting] into this guy's mind, [claiming he is] ten down, two to go in his Herculean Labours."

More recently, young French researcher Emmanuel Mezino claims to have deciphered the cryptogram and precisely located the treasure, which is believed to be buried somewhere on Réunion Island. He says that in 2012 he joined a team of amateur researchers and cracked the cipher written in the Francacan alphabet. He claims to have located the treasure, which he recounts in his book ‘Mon trésor à qui saura le prendre’, published in 2014. Unfortunately, it is now impossible for us to go any further because we have not obtained the necessary administrative authorisations to dig on the island. What's really regrettable is that the site is currently being wildly excavated, and some of the remains and pieces have already disappeared. The real place for this treasure is in a museum.

In November 2023, French chemist Cyrille Lougnon, grandson of Albert Lougnon, historian of Reunion island, published a book titled Olivier Levasseur dit la Buse, piraterie et contrebande sur la route de Indes au xviiie siècle (Riveneuve). He revealed how he had discovered ‘le cairn de La Ravine à Malheur’ on Réunion Island and spoke of a 200 m3 megalithic structure less than 1,000 m from the Crémont road, under which the treasure cache was believed to be hidden.

=== Transcription of the cryptogram ===
1. aprè jmez une paire de pijon tiresket
2. 2 doeurs sqeseaj tête cheral funeklort
3. filttinshientecu prenez une cullière
4. de mielle ef ovtre fous en faites une ongat
5. mettez sur ke patai de la pertotitousn
6. vpulezolvs prenez 2 let cassé sur le che
7. min il faut qoe ut toit a noitie couue
8. povr en pecger une femme dhrengt vous n ave
9. eua vous serer la dobaucfea et pour ve
10. ngraai et por epingle oueiuileturlor
11. eiljn our la ire piter un chien tupqun
12. lenen de la mer de bien tecjeet sur ru
13. nvovl en quilnise iudf kuue femm rq
14. i veut se faire dun hmetsedete s/u dre
15. dans duui ooun dormir un homm r
16. esscfvmm / pl faut n rendre udlq
17. u un diffur qecieefurtetlesl

=== Veracity of the cryptogram ===
The cipher was first mentioned in the 1934 book Le Flibustier mysterieux: Histoire d’un trésor caché by Charles de La Roncière. No mention of Levasseur's supposed cryptogram, his necklace, or his gallows speech occurs in period sources. Modern historians of piracy regard the legend as a 20th century fiction.

== Levasseur's flags ==
There are known descriptions of two white flags and five black flags used by Levasseur.

Jolly Roger flag of pirate Olivier Levasseur (La Buse), described as a "white ensign with a figure of a dead man spread in it"; one of the few mentions of a black-on-white Jolly Roger flag.

Another of Olivier Levasseur's pirate flags, described as "Death’s head in black in ye middle of a white ensign" as written in a handwritten note regarding an attack by Levasseur, in a copy of Jeremy Taylor’s Holy Living and Holy Dying.

Another of Levasseur's pirate flags, described as “A black flag in which is represented a corpse which holds in one hand a saber which he holds raised, at his feet a man on his knees.”

Another of Levasseur's pirate flags, described as “… made of black cloth and was painted in the middle a skeleton flanked by scattered bones and crossed cutlasses”

Another of Levasseur's pirate flags, described as “They made it of black silk. In its centre, there was the figure of a naked man with a cutlass in his right hand, and the left one holding a decapitated [sic] head by the hair.”

Another of Levasseur's pirate flags, described as a “Black flag in which for figure there were four skulls and two bones in cross with white tears”.

Another of Levasseur's pirate flags, described as a “black flag with a skeleton holding an hourglass and a sword, teardrops, and a man lying down”.

== Popular culture ==
- Olivier Levasseur is occasionally noted erroneously as the inspiration for the pirate villain Levasseur in the novel Captain Blood: His Odyssey and its film versions, including the famous 1935 release starring Errol Flynn as Captain Blood and Basil Rathbone as Levasseur. However, Rafael Sabatini, author of Captain Blood: His Odyssey, by his own admission took much of his inspiration for the novel from Alexandre Exquemelin's English and French editions of The Buccaneers of America, and based the villain Levasseur on Exquemelin's descriptions of François Levasseur (also Jean Le Vasseur, M. de Le Vasseur), governor of Tortuga during the mid-seventeenth century, and François l’Ollonois.
- The story of Levasseur's treasure was featured in the comic book series Spike and Suzy (also known in the UK as Bob & Bobette or the original names Suske en Wiske by the Flemish author Willy Vandersteen), in the album The Amazing Coconut (1990). There the medallion of Levasseur was taken by a bird, which fled into the forest, where it became trapped in a mature fruit called coco de mer. This coconut was sold in Belgium in 1988 to the heroes of the series, and they went on to discover the medallion and finally the treasure.
- The 28th episode of Redbeard features the fictitious daughter of the historical pirate Olivier Levasseur.
- In the Japanese anime and manga series One Piece, the main storyline is ignited by the deceased pirate Gol D. Roger, who, much like Levasseur, during his public execution dared the assembled people to find his hidden treasure called "One Piece", assuring them that he had left everything he owned in one place. Similar to Levasseur's cryptogram, the location of the "One Piece" treasure is revealed by deciphering an unknown language inscribed on large steles called Poneglyphs.
- In the mobile game Assassin's Creed: Pirates, the Templar-fronted corporation Abstergo Industries wants to find La Buse's treasure. To this end, they hire the player, a genetic memory researcher, to delve into the memories of the pirate Alonzo Batilla, whom La Buse befriended before becoming a legend. His treasure contains a Piece of Eden, one of numerous artifacts left behind by the First Civilization, humanity's precursors.
- The travel book The Age of Kali by William Dalrymple devotes a chapter to Levasseur and the people's local belief in the spiritual power associated with his grave in Saint-Denis.
- The Amazon Prime Video series The Grand Tour features La Buse's treasure in season 4 episode 2 "A Massive Hunt". The episode ends with Jeremy Clarkson, Richard Hammond and James May failing to find the treasure - but discovering the Holy Grail instead, to their disappointment.

== See also ==
- List of pirates
- Cryptogram of Olivier Levasseur

== General and cited references ==
- Treasure Islands, Cameron platt & John Wright, London, O'Mara books, 1992. ISBN 90-6564-201-3
- Pirates!: Brigands, Buccaneers, and Privateers in Fact, fiction, and Legend, Jan Rogozinski, New York: Da Capo Press, 1996. ISBN 0-306-80722-X
- Under the Black Flag: Exploits of the Most Notorious Pirates, Don Carlos Seitz, Mineola, NY: Courier Dover Publications, 2002. ISBN 0-486-42131-7
- Erik A. Dresen, Paragon Island, Ventura Verlag (2015), ISBN 978-3-940853-29-5; Die Paragoninsel, Ventura Verlag (2015), ISBN 978-3-940853-28-8.
- (in French) http://www.pirates-corsaires.com/levasseur-la-buse.htm
- Nelson, Laura "Samuel Bellamy and Olivier Levasseur – Two Pirates Just Kickin' Around the Caribbean" in Pirates and Privateers http://www.cindyvallar.com/BellamyLevasseur.html
