= Richard Taylor (pirate) =

18th-century pirate

Richard (John) Taylor
- Born: England
- Piratical career
- Type: Pirate
- Allegiance: None
- Rank: Captain
- Base of operations: West Indies, Indian Ocean
- Commands: Victory and Cassandra

Richard Taylor (fl. 1718–1723), also called John Taylor, (Note: Many pirate histories refer to him as John Taylor, though eyewitness accounts confirm that his first name was actually Richard.) was an English pirate active in the Indian Ocean, best known for participating in two of the richest pirate captures of all time.

== History ==
Taylor's Jolly Roger pirate flag, described as “Fought under the black flagg at ye main topmast head. with deaths head in it”

Prior to his time as a pirate, Taylor had risen to the rank of Lieutenant in the Royal Navy. Taylor began his piratical career in 1718 as a crewman aboard the trading sloop Buck when Howell Davis staged a mutiny, took over the ship, and convinced the crew to take up piracy. After attempting to oust Davis from command, Taylor transferred to a prize ship commanded by Jeremiah Cocklyn, who soon split with Davis to sail alongside Olivier Levasseur.

They captured ships off Ouidah in 1720 after which Leveasseur left to raid the East Indies. Cocklyn and his crew transferred to the captured vessel Victory and proceeded to one of several pirate outposts at Madagascar. Taylor was elected Captain when Cocklyn died, partnering with Edward England and Jasper Seagar aboard the Fancy. England, meanwhile, had rescued Levasseur and his crew, who had been stranded after wrecking their ship.

In July 1720 Fancy and Victory found the East India Company ship Cassandra at anchor off Johanna. After a lengthy and brutal engagement, Cassandra's Captain James Macrae and his crew escaped inland. Macrae returned to negotiate with the pirates and was saved when some of the pirates, who had once served under Macrae, intervened on his behalf. England gave Macrae the badly damaged Fancy and let him keep some of the pirates’ less-valuable loot. Taylor was enraged at England's generosity and organized a vote to remove him from command and leave him marooned.

Levasseur, Seagar, and Taylor took the Victory and Cassandra, with sources differing on who was in command of which ship. They captured some Muscat ships then engaged a fleet from Bombay but were driven off. Off Malabar in late 1720 they traded with Dutch agents at Cochin before returning to Madagascar that December. There they encountered pirate trader John Plantain and fellow pirate Edward Condon. The pirates spent Easter of 1721 at the Mascarene Islands.

At Reunion Island in April 1721 Taylor, Levasseur, and Seagar captured probably the most valuable prize in pirate history, the 700-ton Portuguese treasure ship Nossa Senhora do Cabo (Our Lady of the Cape). (Note: The Cabo is referred to as the Guelderland in some accounts.) The ship carried gold, uncut diamonds and church regalia belonging to the retiring Viceroy of Goa in Portuguese India. The Portuguese ship had been dismasted in a storm and proved to be an easy prize, captured after a brief boarding action. Levasseur, Seagar, and Taylor made off with treasure then maximum valued at approximately a million pounds sterling.

After capturing the fort at Delagoa the combined company split up in 1722. The group returned to Madagascar where Seagar died. While there they intercepted letters detailing the ships of a Royal Navy squadron sent to hunt them down; Taylor had the letters read aloud at the ship's mast. Levasseur took Cabo and Taylor took Cassandra, swapping ships after burning the decrepit Victory. Taylor headed for the West Indies, arriving there in 1723. The governor of Spanish Portobello pardoned Taylor and his crew in exchange for his ship the Cassandra. Taylor thereafter sailed in Spanish service, hunting logwood cutters in the Caribbean. Jacob de Bucquoy, who spent time as Taylor's prisoner, reported that Taylor eventually left Portobello, returning to his family at Jamaica before leaving again for Cuba, where he operated a plantation and a small trading vessel as late as 1744.

== See also ==
- Adam Baldridge and Abraham Samuel, ex-pirates who (like Plantain) established trading posts on or near Madagascar.
