= Jasper Seagar =

18th century pirate

Jasper Seagar (Note: In various sources Seagar’s name is spelled Seagar, Seegar, Seager, Seater, or Siger.) (died 1721) was a pirate active in the Indian Ocean, best known for sailing with Edward England, Olivier Levasseur, and Richard Taylor.

== Identity ==
Some sources claim Edward England was born Edward Seegar, or that Jasper Seagar was England's real name. Other accounts from trial depositions make clear that Seagar was a separate person, and that he took over captaincy of England's ship after England was marooned by his crew: "...the sd Ship the Victory under ye Comand of the sd Richard Taylor and the Cassandra under the Comand of Jaspar Seater who was made Captain of her in the room of ye sd Edward England (who was turned out of Comand) proceeded to the East India...".

== History ==
In 1719, pirate Thomas Cocklyn in the Victory put into Madagascar alongside Edward England's Fancy and John Galley. Cocklyn died there; England burned the John Galley, transferring Cocklyn's crew to the other two ships, and Richard Taylor was placed as captain aboard the Victory. Seagar commanded the Fancy while England remained in command of the overall fleet.

Off the island of Johanna they engaged the Cassandra under Captain James Macrae (also McCrae or Mackra), who was forced to beach his ship and flee inland but not before heavily damaging the Fancy and killing a number of pirates. The Cassandra had sailed with the Greenwich under Captain Kirby, who reported England commanding the Victory and Seagar commanding the Fancy. Richard Lazenby, a carpenter's mate taken from the Cassandra and pressed into service by the pirates, later reported to the East India Company and named Seagar as captain of the Fancy, with Taylor captaining the Victory. Macrae eventually surrendered to the pirates. England spared him and gave him the crippled Fancy; this enraged Taylor, who had England removed from command and marooned.

“[The] Cassandra being the Leewardmost ship was ingaged by [Seagar’s] small ship, they fought under ye black flagg att ye main topmast head with Death's head in itt ye Red flagg att the foretopmast head & St. George's Colours att. ye Ensign Staff. “ – Journal of John Barnes, Chief Mate of the Greenwich

The Cassandra was fitted out for piracy and Jasper Seagar was placed in command. Sailing alongside Taylor, Seagar proceeded toward the East Indies and plundered several ships. After unsuccessfully engaging a fleet from Bombay they put in at Cochin to sell their booty. From there they sailed out, repaired the Victory, and in early 1721 captured ships near Mauritius, including Nossa Senhora do Cabo, which carried the Bishop of Goa and the retiring Portuguese Viceroy and netted the pirates immense treasure. In his report on the incident the Viceroy noted Seagar as commanding the Fancy, not the Cassandra (which the pirates may have renamed), and claimed Levasseur was commanding the Victory, with Taylor serving as quartermaster.

Sailing to Île Sainte-Marie near Madagascar, they burned the Victory and fitted out the Cabo for piracy; Seagar died while on Madagascar of unknown causes. Levasseur captained the Cassandra after Seagar's death, eventually exchanging ships with Taylor who sailed it to the Caribbean and traded it to the governor of Porto Bello for amnesty. Oliver Levasseur took the refitted Nossa Senhora do Cabo until his retirement and recapture.

== See also ==
- Adam Baldridge, Abraham Samuel, and James Plaintain, ex-pirates who ran pirate trading posts on Île Sainte-Marie and Madagascar.
