= Wilkinson Memorial Trail =

Footpath in New York, United States

Coordinates: 41.4478°N 73.9802°W

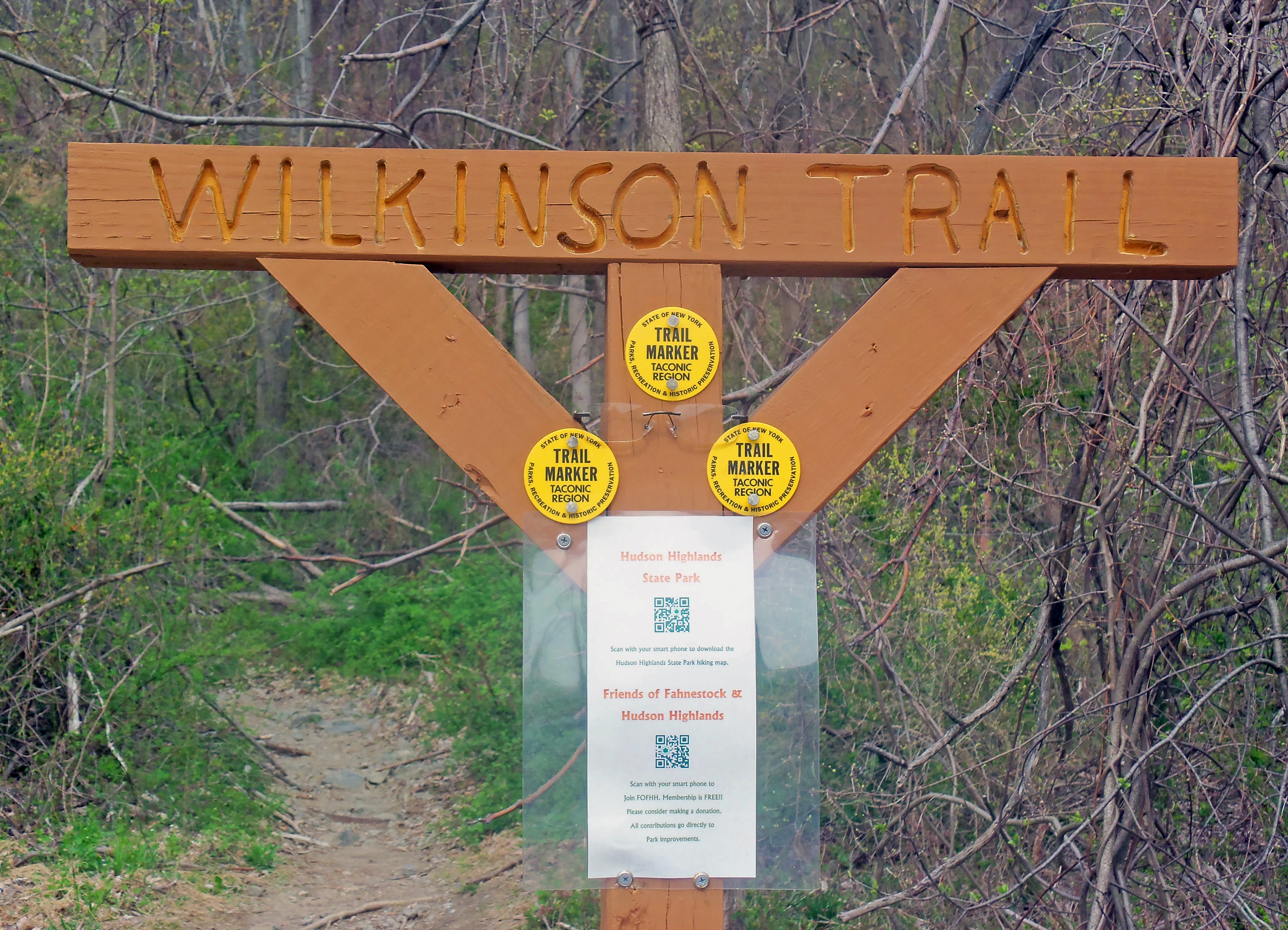
- Sign at western trailhead on NY 9D
- Length: 9.5 miles (15.3 km)
- Trailheads: NY 9D (west), Old Albany Post Road (east)
- Use: Hiking
- Elevation gain/loss: 2,150 feet (660 m) gain, 1,660 feet (510 m) loss.
- Highest point: Scofield Ridge, 1,540 feet (470 m)
- Lowest point: Western trailhead, 10 ft (3 m)
- Season: All
- Waymark: Yellow round plastic marker or rectangular paint blaze
- Sights: Sugarloaf Mountain, Scofield Ridge
- Surface: natural
- Right of way: Old woods roads (some)

The Wilkinson Memorial Trail is a public footpath in the Hudson Highlands region of the U.S. state of New York. It generally follows the Dutchess–Putnam county line along the latter's northwest corner, from the banks of the Hudson River near Breakneck Ridge to North Highland, just south of the county line in Philipstown. At 9.5 miles (15.3 km) in length it is the longest trail in the Hudson Highlands State Park system; although parts of the trail are on other public and private parcels in the area.

It is rarely hiked in its entirety. Portions are used as part of common loop routes in the area, such as Breakneck Ridge near its west end and Fishkill Ridge at its east. Popular destinations served by the trail include Sugarloaf Mountain, a 900-foot (270 m) peak near the western end that offers panoramic views over the river and surrounding peaks, and Scofield Ridge, at 1,540 feet (470 m) not only the highest point along the trail but also in all of Putnam County, near the east end.

== Route ==
The western trailhead is located along New York State Route 9D in the town of Fishkill, just north of the county line. It is across from the parking lot for the nearby Breakneck Ridge trailhead and the short path to the Breakneck Ridge station, where trains on Metro-North Railroad's Hudson Line stop on weekends, bringing many hikers to the trails in the vicinity. The trail uses yellow as its blaze color, either in the form of rectangular daubs of paint or circular plastic markers.

From Route 9D, just above sea level at the nearby Hudson River, the trail begins a gentle climb in a generally north-northeast direction along an old woods road, making a long switchback and then following a wide streambed more directly uphill. At a half-mile (800 m) from the trailhead, the red-blazed Breakneck Bypass Trail, a route to that mountain's summit which avoids the steep climb followed by the Breakneck Ridge Trail up the west face, branches off to the northeast.

Shortly after the junction an unofficial trail branches off to the northeast, allowing those who wish to follow it the opportunity to skip the impending ascent of Sugarloaf Mountain, sometimes called Sugarloaf North to distinguish it from Sugarloaf Hill, which also overlooks the Hudson roughly 10 miles (16 km) to the south near Garrison in Putnam County. After the fork the Wilkinson descends slightly, then begins to climb the steep south face of Sugarloaf. Tight switchbacks take the trail through narrow rock chutes in the nearly vertical slope.

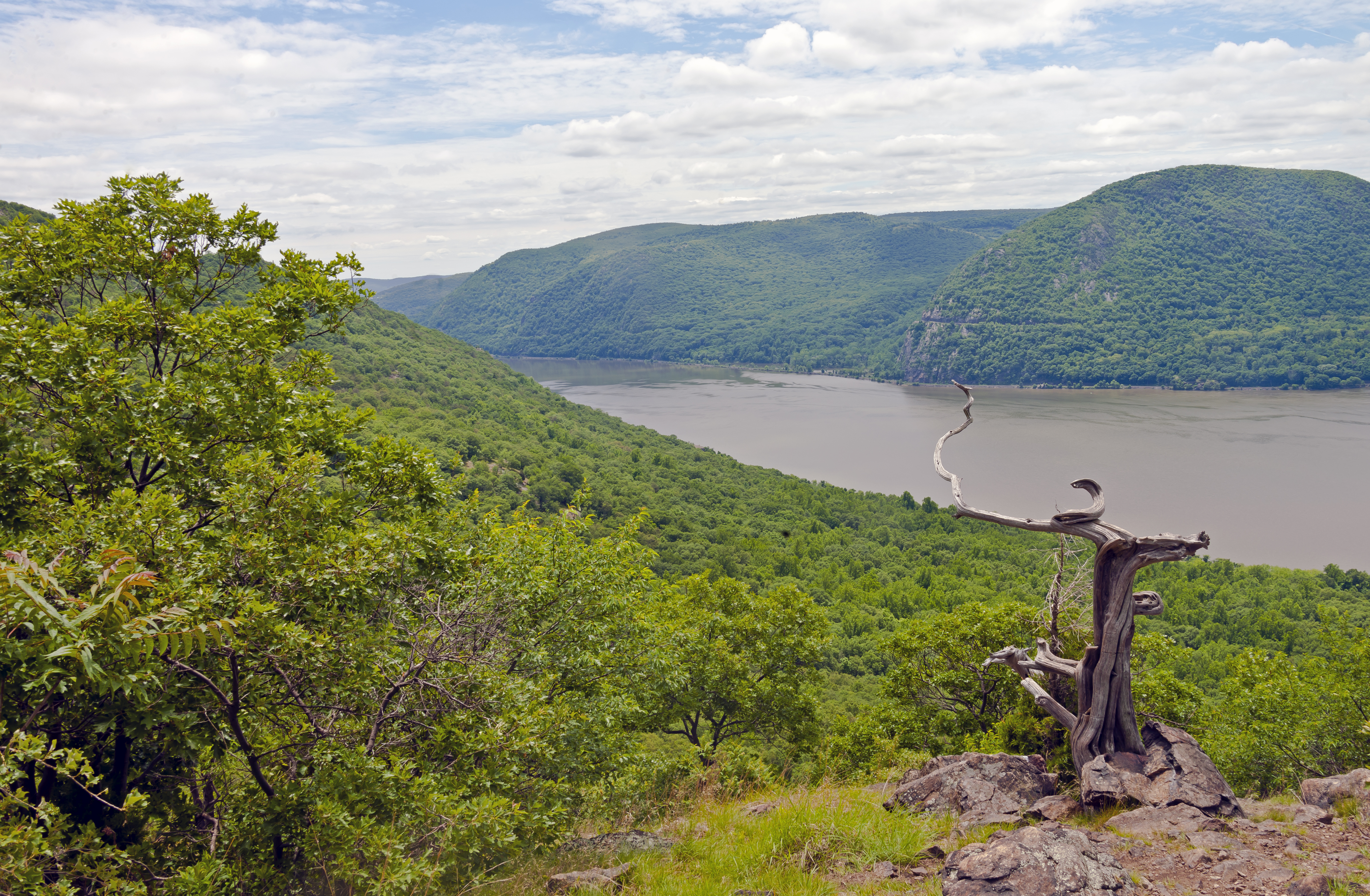
View from south end of Sugarloaf

After the climb, almost another half-mile, the trail reaches a viewpoint on the south end of Sugarloaf's summit plateau. To the south is a panoramic vista over the river, with Breakneck Ridge and Storm King Mountain on the other side predominating. Just below is Bannerman's Island, site of a former arsenal and listed on the National Register of Historic Places. The trail passes over Sugarloaf's 900-foot (270 m) summit in the middle of a wooded area before reaching another viewpoint on the north end, looking toward Beacon Mountain, the city of Beacon and the Newburgh-Beacon Bridge that carries Interstate 84 over Newburgh Bay to Newburgh, also visible.

Afterwards the trail turns sharply. In contrast to the south face of Sugarloaf, the descent from the north side is gentler, following a long traverse southeast, east and then northeast down to roughly 620 feet (190 m) in the Wades Brook valley. It then begins to ascend gently alongside the brook, crossing it one mile (1.6 km) from the summit of Sugarloaf.

It then turns north and steepens into a 400-foot (120 m) ascent of an unnamed summit. After 0.3 mile (400 m), the trail levels out for about the same distance, then makes a 120-foot (37 m) climb to a 1,240-foot (380 m) summit, the highest elevation it reaches in Dutchess County. There is another viewpoint to the north and west similar to that from the north end of Sugarloaf.

A steep descent takes the trail off the summit and out of the state park. For the next mile it follows an easement over private land. Shortly after crossing the land boundary, the blue-blazed Notch Trail joins the Wilkinson at a three-way junction. The two trails run concurrently as they descend steadily over the next half-mile to Squirrel Hollow Brook, where they turn west abruptly, then cross.

Just after the crossing, the Wilkinson veers off to the northeast. It remains generally level, curving away from the brook over its next 0.3 mile then southeast back toward it. At the brook, it intersects another trail—the white-blazed Breakneck Ridge Trail. The two briefly merge, following a northeast heading. Just before re-entering the state park, they diverge again.

The Wilkinson Trail stays close to the brook, gently ascending as it follows the stream's headwaters northeast to the county line. A moderate ascent along the boundary continues in a northeast direction for 0.1 miles (160 m) until it turns more easterly and crosses into Putnam County for the first time. Shortly afterward, the red-blazed Casino Trail terminates at a junction on the northwest side.

The county line also brings the trail once again into private land, this time the property of the Lake Valhalla homeowners' association in the valley to the southeast, also listed on the National Register as a historic district. The trail veers to the southeast, then sharply back to the northwest as it climbs the first of Scofield Ridge's three summits. All reach 1,540 feet (470 m) in elevation, making the mountain Putnam County's highest. There are viewpoints at both ends of the first knob, allowing views over Lake Valhalla itself to the southeast and Fahnestock State Park beyond to the southeast; Beacon Mountain's two summits, including the 1,610-foot (490 m) South Beacon, highest peak in the Hudson Highlands, dominate the view from the other end. Similar views are available from the other knobs.

It takes approximately a mile for the trail to go over Scofield Ridge. Midway along the northernmost summit, it crosses back into Dutchess County. This tract of land is the Fishkill Ridge Conservation Area, owned and managed by the nonprofit Scenic Hudson. It takes a long switchback down the steep slope to the northeast, then back southwest, where a view opens up to the northwest. At the end of the next traverse, a short path leads to another overlook.

From there the trail continues its steep, switchbacked descent to the col between Scofield and Lambs Hill just to its north. At Dozer Junction, so named for the old bulldozer a short distance away, a blue-blazed connector trail leads uphill a short distance to the Fishkill Ridge Trail as the Wilkinson follows an old road to the east, which continues as the Fishkill Ridge Trail after a quarter-mile. The Wilkinson turns east-southeast and begins to descend, again entering private property.

A long switchback takes the trail back into Putnam County. It takes another long switchback as it follows the valley of an unnamed stream. At the bottom of this slope, it veers northeast again, alongside the conservation-area boundary as it briefly returns to Dutchess County, following the north side of a small pond on the county line. It then returns to Putnam County for its remaining quarter-mile descent to its eastern trailhead, at the gated end of Reservoir Road, a short distance from U.S. Route 9.

== History ==
The trail is named for Samuel Wilkinson, a dedicated trail builder and maintainer who later became president of the New York–New Jersey Trail Conference, whose volunteers maintain the trail.

== See also ==
- List of trails in New York
