= Sugarloaf Mountain (Dutchess County, New York) =

Mountain in New York, United States

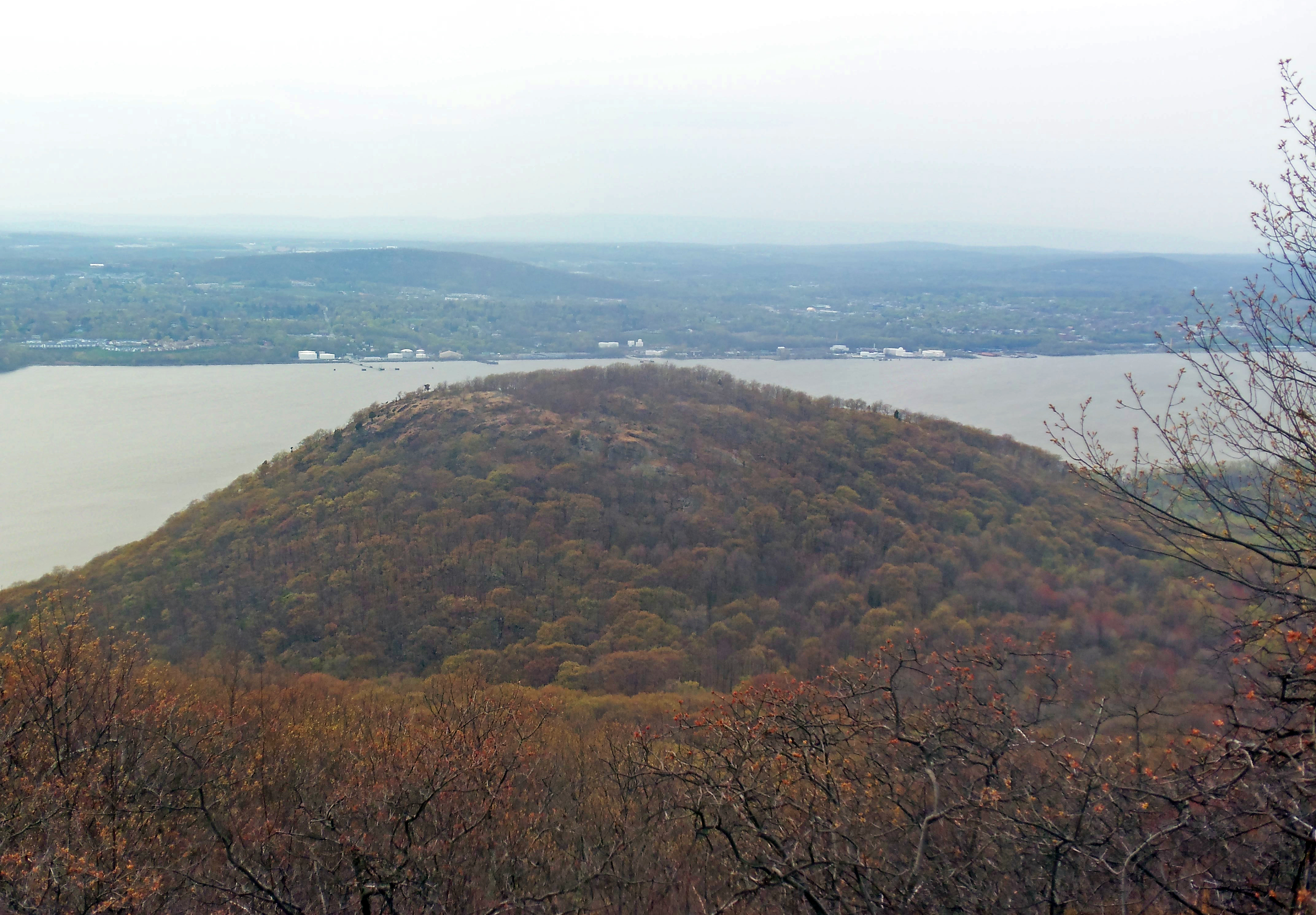
- Sugarloaf from the Breakneck Bypass Trail

Highest point
- Elevation: 900 ft (270 m)
- Prominence: 300 ft (91 m)
- Parent peak: Breakneck Ridge
- Isolation: 0.7 mi (1.1 km)
- Coordinates: 41°27′30″N 73°58′30″W

Geography
- Location within New York
- Parent range: Hudson Highlands
- Topo map: West Point

Climbing
- Easiest route: Trail
- Access: Public

Sugarloaf Mountain is a 900-foot (270 m) peak located in the town of Fishkill near the Hudson River and Breakneck Ridge. One of several similarly named mountains in the U.S. state of New York, it is part of the Hudson Highlands, located entirely within Hudson Highlands State Park.

It can be climbed via the Wilkinson Memorial Trail, which has its western trailhead a mile (1.6 km) from the summit on New York State Route 9D along the Hudson River, opposite the Breakneck Ridge station on Metro-North Railroad's Hudson Line. The trail climbs gently at first but then steeply as it approaches the summit plateau. At either end there are panoramic views over the river's Newburgh Bay, surrounding mountains and nearby communities.

== See also ==
- List of mountains in New York
- List of mountains named Sugarloaf
