= Hudson Highlands State Park =

Protected area in mountains along Hudson River north of New York City

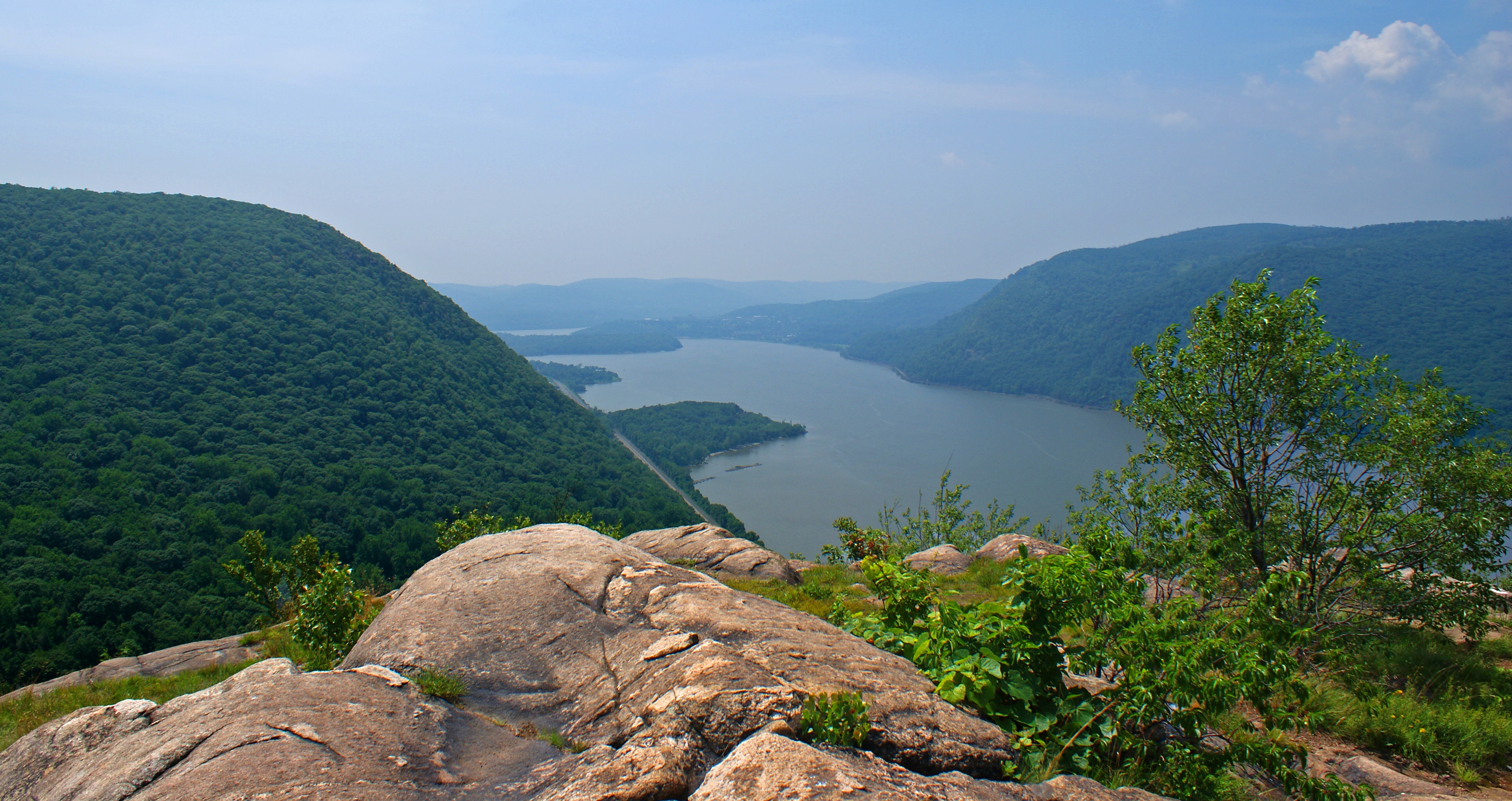
- View south from Breakneck Ridge

- Location within New York
- Location: Hudson Valley, New York, United States
- Coordinates: 41°27′31″N 73°57′35″W
- Area: 11.98 sq mi (31.0 km^{2})
- Elevation: 1,260 ft (380 m)
- Named for: Location in Hudson Highlands
- Visitors: 224,015 (in 2014)
- Operator: New York State Office of Parks, Recreation and Historic Preservation
- Website: Hudson Highlands State Park

Hudson Highlands State Park is a non-contiguous state park in the U.S. state of New York, located on the east side of the Hudson River. The park runs from Peekskill in Westchester County, through Putnam County, to Beacon in Dutchess County, in the eastern section of the Hudson Highlands.

The park's lands, heavily mined, logged and quarried in the past, were assembled over the mid-20th century from different purchases by the state, totaling 8,900 acres (36.02 km^{2}; 13.91 sq mi) as of 2025. They range from riverside salt marshes to mountain summits, including the highest in the Highlands, the 1,610-foot (490 m) south summit of Beacon Mountain. It is managed by the New York State Office of Parks, Recreation and Historic Preservation (NYSOPRHP) from offices at Fahnestock State Park to the east. Its parcels adjoin others owned by other public agencies and private preserves, some of which are managed by NYSOPRHP as well and are open to the public.

Due to its panoramic views of the river and mountains, and easy access by both automobile and rail, it has become a very popular destination for day hikes. The park's best known trail makes a steep, rocky ascent up Breakneck Ridge. Other trails climb neighboring Bull Hill and follow the cliffs of Anthony's Nose. The Appalachian Trail (AT) also goes through the southeast corner of the park.

== Geography ==
The park is composed of four separate tracts of land, two of which are contiguous, reflecting its piecemeal acquisition. The southernmost section begins just north of Peekskill, abutting the New York National Guard's Camp Smith, following the Bear Mountain Highway (US 6 and 202) around the lower slopes of Anthony's Nose. In Putnam County, it serves as the AT's corridor along the north of the mountain and on Canada Hill. In the land above Manitoga, the former estate of industrial designer Russel Wright, the AT interconnects with its trail system and follows the border with another parcel known as the Osborn Preserve, formerly part of Wing & Wing, the estate of 19th-century Illinois Central railroad president William Osborn.

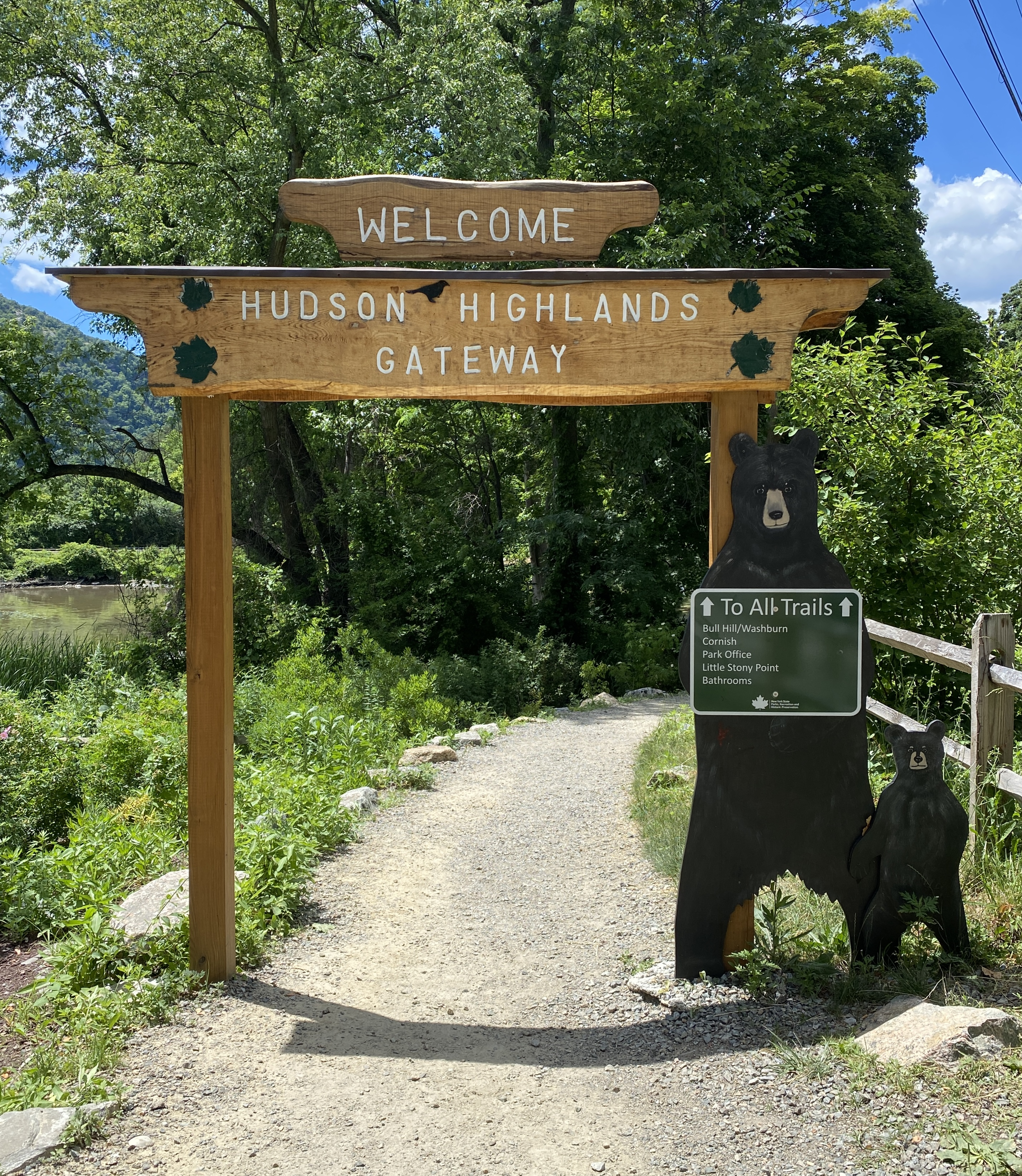
Hudson Highlands State Park Gateway, June 2026

The AT leaves the state park for a National Park Service-owned corridor here, and the other trails provide access to Sugarloaf Hill, whose 760-foot (230 m) summit looks across the river at the village of Highland Falls and the United States Military Academy at West Point. Here, near Garrison, the southern parcels end.

North of the villages of Cold Spring and Nelsonville is the central and largest section. Starting at the Little Stony Point area along the river, which is separated from the rest of the parcel by the easement for the New York City water supply system's Catskill Aqueduct, this section contains Bull Hill and Breakneck Ridge, with Breakneck Brook between them, then sprawls into Dutchess County, where it includes Pollepel Island, Sugarloaf Mountain, the south summit of Beacon Mountain and Beacon Reservoir, reaching its northern terminus at the Dry Brook trailhead at the end of Pocket Road in the city of Beacon. It is complemented by Storm King State Park across the river.

The Fishkill Ridge Conservation Area, owned by the environmental organization Scenic Hudson but managed by NYSOPRHP, bridges the gap between that central tract and the northern tract, a trail-less parcel on Sour Mountain at the Highlands' northern end, reaching almost to Interstate 84 at the bottom of the slope.

Also in Beacon is the 66-acre (27 ha) Denning Point parcel. This small wooded promontory is located where Fishkill Creek drains into the Hudson.

== History ==
=== The Eastern Highlands before the 20th century ===
Swedish botanist Pehr Kalm sailed up the Hudson in 1749 and wrote one of the earliest accounts of the eastern Highlands:

Eastward a high chain of mountains whose sides were covered with woods up to no more than half their height. The summits, however, were quite barren, for I suppose nothing would grow there on account of the great degree of heat, dryness, and the violence of the wind to which that part was exposed.

Kalm landed in the area and wrote the first scientific description of mountain laurel, a plant species still abundant in the area.

For most of American history, the Highlands were harvested for their natural resources, particularly mineral. Iron and copper were mined from them. Some of the former was used to make cannons by the Continental Army during the Revolutionary War, and the West Point Foundry in Cold Spring continued making them under the direction of Robert Parrott through the late 19th century. Quarries were also carved out of the slopes, most notably on Breakneck Ridge and Bull Hill.

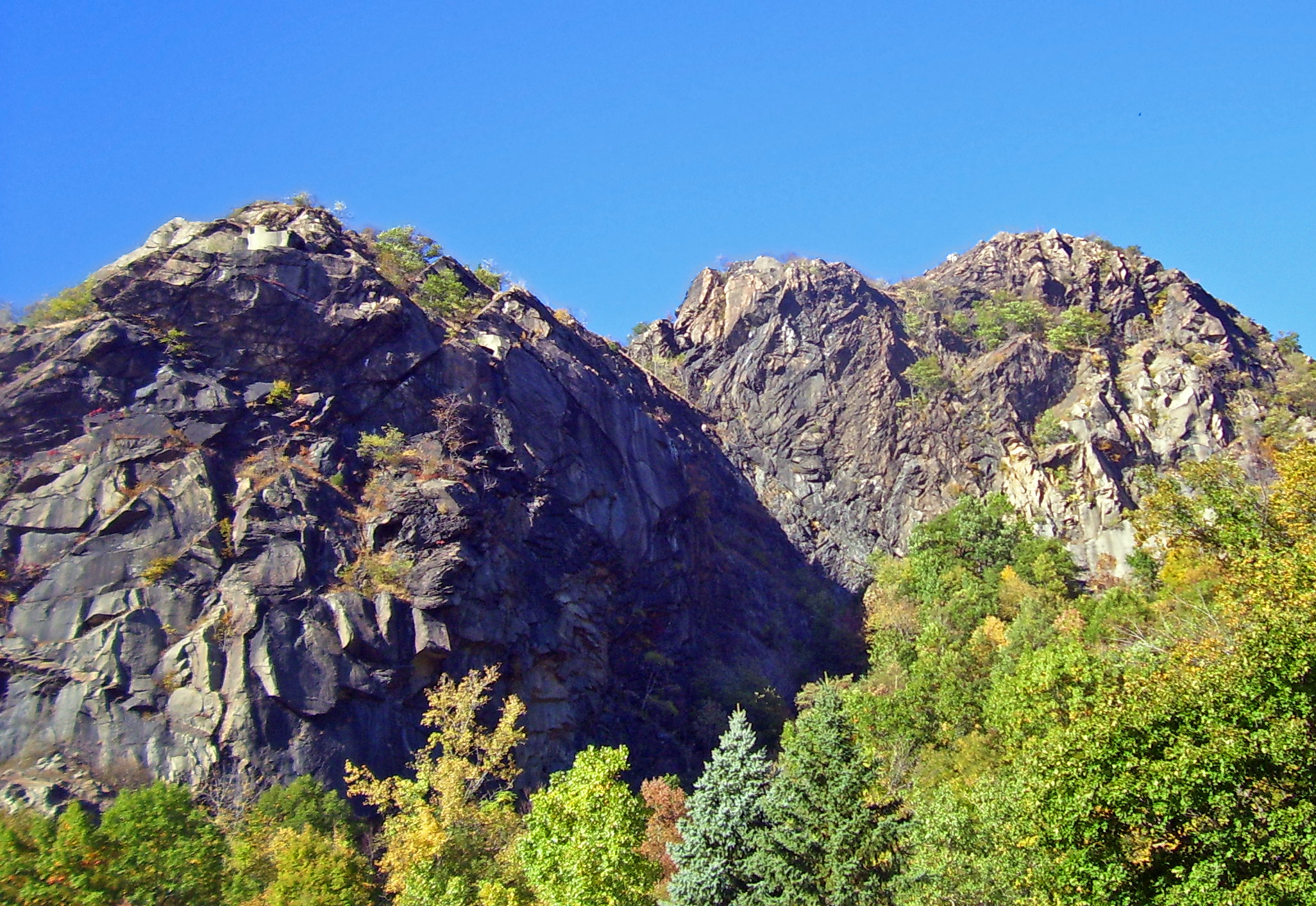
Quarrying created the stony cliffs on the south face of Breakneck Ridge

By the beginning of the 20th century, the eastern Highlands had been mostly tapped out as an easy source of minerals and were reforesting. Early hikers began to explore them, following the abandoned paths and roads from the earlier extractions. One, William T. Howell, catalogued their history and lore. In 1910, he pleaded for the land to be left alone and preserved in near-wilderness condition as summer vacationers started to head north looking for green spaces:

There is but one perfect solution as to the preservation of the Highlands, though I know in my heart that it will never be realized. That is, to leave them alone. By that I mean, keep out all foreign influences. That means more than quarries and manufacturies. It means hotels and parking projects, and even ... roads and easy paths. There is something more at stake here than the preservation of the scenery ... There is a wild charm and isolation about the Highlands that will fly forever when the "improvements" begin to come in.

=== Creation of park ===
As New York began creating its first state parks in the Hudson Valley Region during the 1910s and 20s, it concentrated its efforts on larger tracts it had acquired such as Harriman and Bear Mountain to the southwest and Fahnestock to the east. Much of the present Hudson Highlands State Park was either part of large estates or owned by commercial interests seeking to exploit their mineral resources. An organization called the Hudson River Conservation Society (HRCS) worked to preserve the lands by persuading owners to donate them to the state or include clauses in deeds that forbade or greatly restricting quarrying and mining operations on the property.

In 1938 the society made its first significant accomplishment when it persuaded Rosalie Loew Whitney to give the state Conservation Department 177 acres (72 ha) on the northwest face of Breakneck Ridge from the estate of Thomas Nelson, the local landowner from whom Nelsonville took its name. The next year, an appeal to save Anthony's Nose raised enough money to purchase 200 acres (81 ha) of its northern slope.

No more major land acquisitions took place until the 1960s, when the State Council of Parks, forerunner of NYSOPRHP, formed the temporary Hudson River Valley Study Committee to develop a comprehensive plan in response to increasing industrial interest in the area, exemplified by Consolidated Edison's proposal to excavate a large chunk of Storm King Mountain, across from Breakneck, for a hydroelectric plant, which would have involved running power lines across the river and into the eastern Highlands. In 1967 the state acquired the Little Stony Point property to prevent its development.

The park finally began to come together towards its present form in the next few years, as the Rockefeller family's Jackson Hole Preserve foundation gave New York a deed of trust for land purchases in the Hudson Highlands. Approximately 2,500 acres (1,000 ha) were acquired this way, primarily in the large central parcel of the park along the Dutchess-Putnam county line. In 1974 William Henry Osborn II, a past HRCS president, donated the 1,033-acre (418 ha) preserve that bears his family name to the state. Scenic Hudson acquired the 923-acre (374 ha) Fishkill Ridge Conservation Area in 1992 with assistance from the Lila Acheson and DeWitt Wallace Fund for the Hudson Highlands.

The north end of the park became the center of a local controversy in the late 1990s. It is home to a den of Eastern timber rattlesnakes, a New York State threatened species. The state's Department of Environmental Conservation brought suit to stop the snake-proof fences a local quarry operator had put up while it was applying for permission to mine stone from the operation. In 1999 then-Attorney General Eliot Spitzer persuaded a court to order the fence be torn down. It survived appeal, and became a legal precedent establishing New York's right to enforce the state's Endangered Species Act on private property.

== Flora and fauna ==
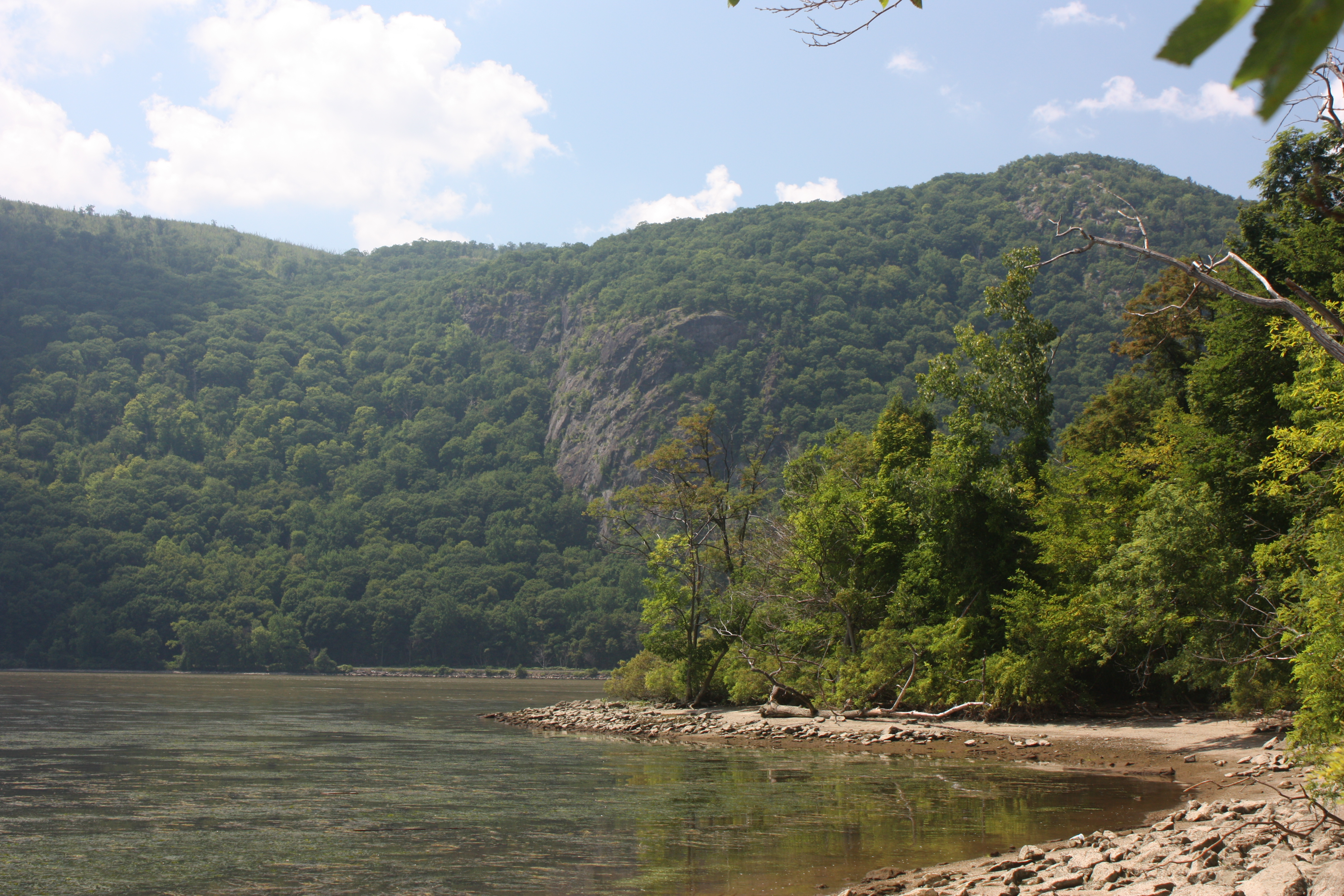
Park at its lowest point along the Hudson River

The park's plants and animals are part of the Northeastern coastal forests ecoregion. Its variety of biomes – ranging from brackish tidal marsh and mudflats along the river's edge to pitch pine-oak-heath rocky summit forest and rocky grasslands at higher elevations – contribute to its biodiversity. The mountain slopes are dominated by oak hickory and chestnut oak forests.

Besides rattlesnakes, the park also supports some other state-listed threatened species, such as the bald eagle and least bittern. Three of New York's five known eastern fence lizard communities are found in Hudson Highlands State Park, near the northern end of its range.

== Public use and access ==
The park is open during daylight hours year-round. It is used mainly for passive recreation, mostly hiking, but also birding. Limited hunting is allowed: bowhunters make take deer during that season in the late fall, and shotguns may be used during spring turkey season. Some areas near the riverside are accessible by kayak, and there is a state-owned launch for them off the Annsville Circle, where US 9 meets routes 6 and 202, north of Peekskill. Camping and open fires are prohibited, as are vehicles of any kind, and there are no designated campsites or shelters in the park.

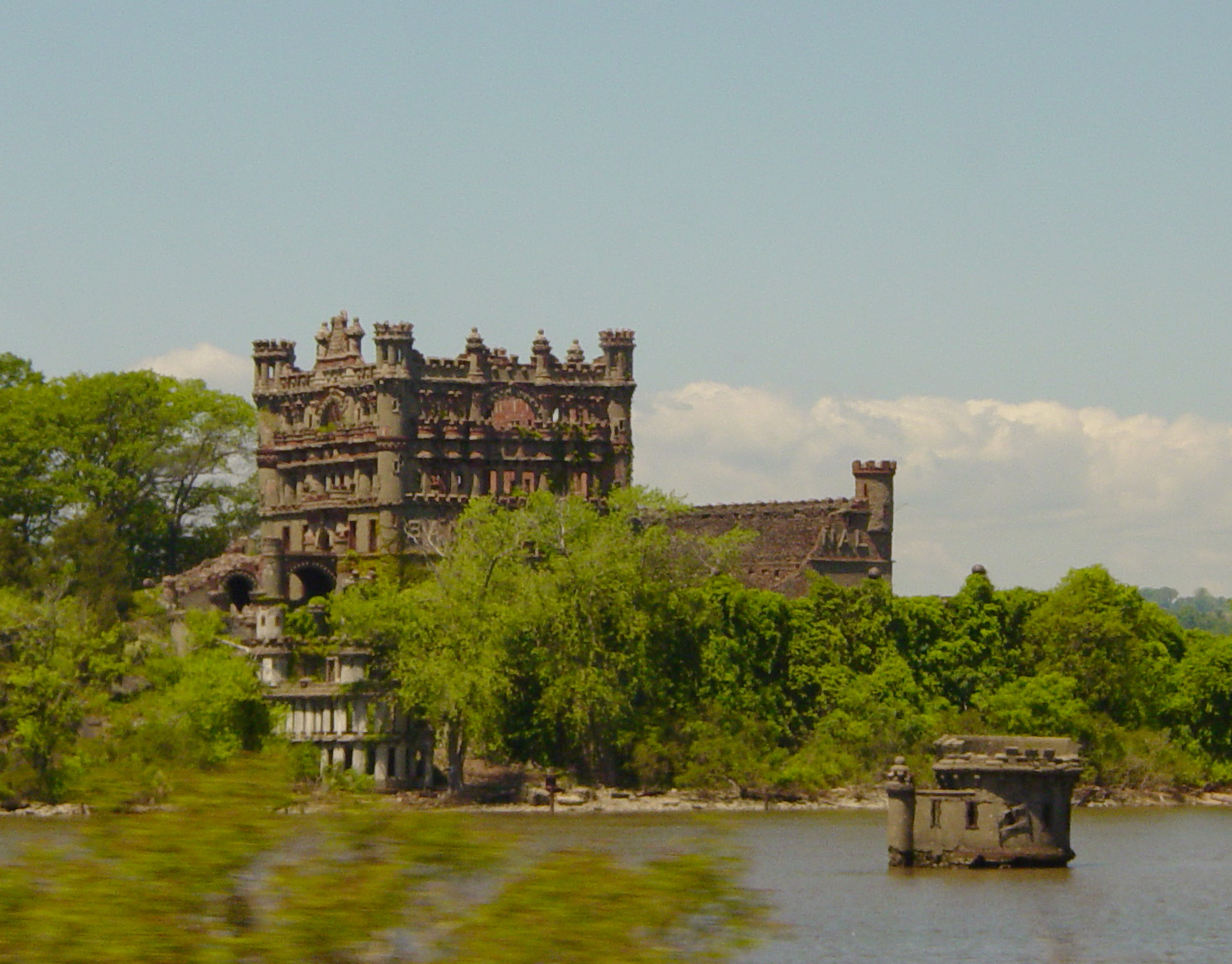
Bannerman's Castle on Pollepel Island

Pollepel Island, while accessible by water a short distance from the east bank of the river, is the only area of the park to which access is restricted. It and the ruins of Bannerman's Castle, listed on the National Register of Historic Places, can only be visited by making advance arrangements through NYSOPRHP for a guided tour.

=== Access ===
The park is most frequently entered from its western side. NY 9D runs near or along its boundaries, particularly between Cold Spring and Breakneck Ridge, and two of its major trailheads are along that section at Little Stony and Breakneck points. The Osborn Preserve and Anthony's Nose sections have trailheads along the Bear Mountain Highway and at the Appalachian Trail crossing at South Mountain Pass Road south of Canada Hill. The AT's junction with US 9 and NY 403 allows access from the east. In Garrison it is also possible to use the trails from Manitoga and the Castle Rock Unique Area to reach the park parcels on the ridgetops.

The Fishkill Ridge areas and Mount Beacon are commonly climbed from the east either by following the Fishkill Ridge trail from its northern terminus at Pocket Road in Beacon. From the west, they can be reached from the Wilkinson Memorial Trail on Old Albany Post Road North just south of the county line along US 9.

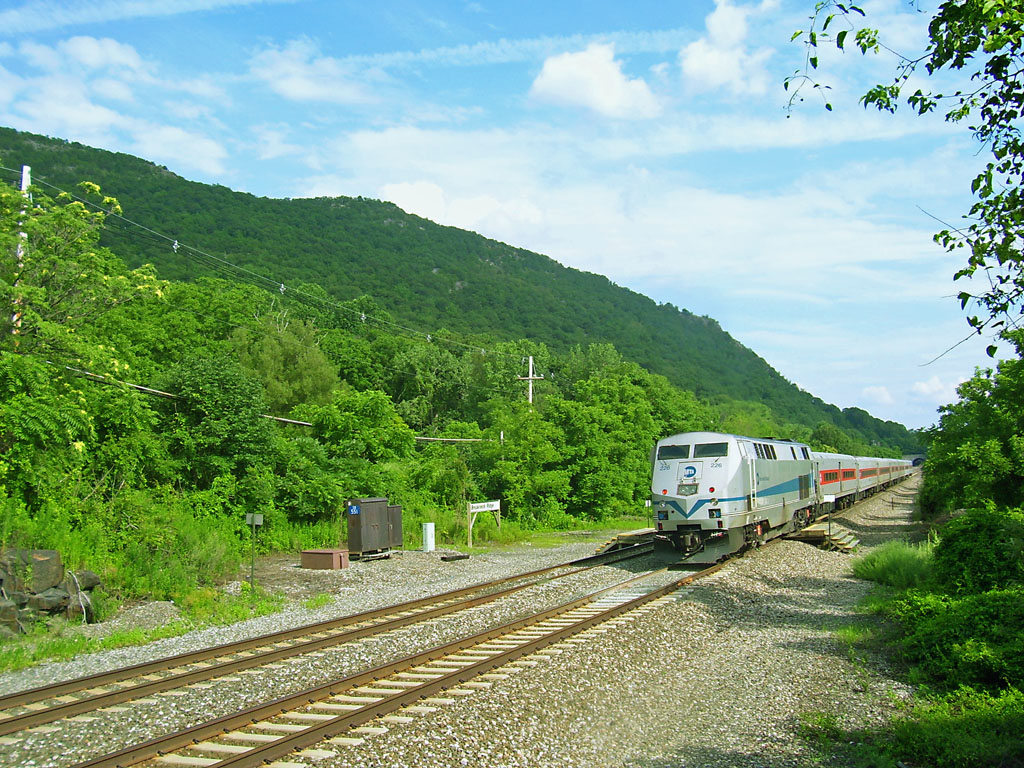
Breakneck Ridge station

Hikers coming from the south also have the option of taking the train to the trails from as far away as Grand Central Terminal in midtown Manhattan. Metro-North Railroad's Hudson Line parallels NY 9D and the east bank of the river, where request stops have been built at Breakneck Ridge and Manitou, south of Garrison along the river. The former is a short distance from the trailhead and parking lot; the latter is at river's edge, requiring a short climb up to the Manitoga and Canada Hill areas. Service to those stations is weekends-only, with northbound trains making stops in the mornings and southbound ones taking returning hikers in the evening. At other times hikers can use the Cold Spring station, with regularly scheduled trains.

=== Trails ===
The trails of the park are maintained by volunteers from the New York-New Jersey Trail Conference, which also publishes detailed maps. Some follow, in whole or part, old woods roads left over from the quarrying and mining operations; at other times they climb the steep and rocky peaks directly. They are blazed with NYSOPRHP plastic disks, except for the Appalachian Trail which uses white paint blazes.

Many take advantage of the ridgetop topography and thinly wooded summits to offer panoramic viewpoints over the river and region.

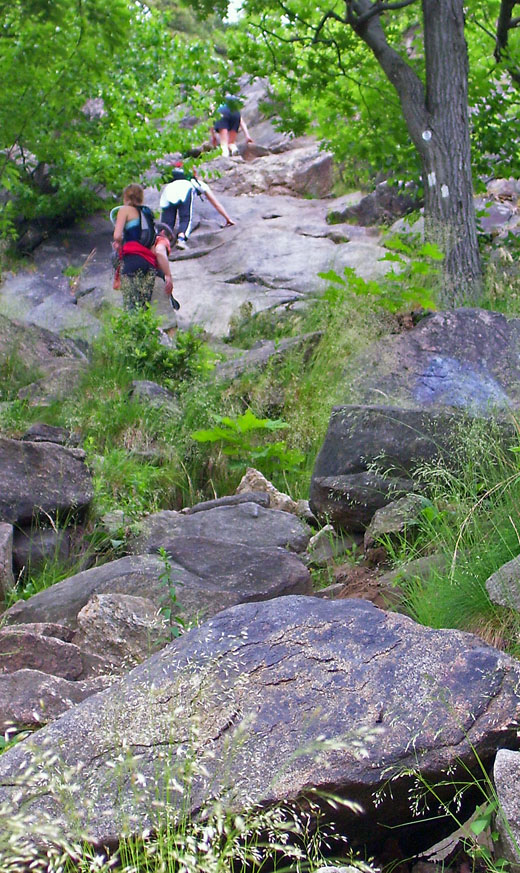
Hikers working their way up a steep section of Breakneck Ridge

Some of the longer and more frequently-hiked trails in the park are:

- Appalachian Trail (AT): A 5.1-mile (8.2 km) section of the Georgia-to-Maine long-distance trail passes through the southern portion of the park near the Osborn Preserve. From NY 9D just north of the Bear Mountain Bridge, it ascends Canada Hill and follows that ridge for two miles before descending to the US 9/NY 403 junction at Graymoor.
- Breakneck Ridge Trail: One of the most popular trails in the park, due to the challenge of the westernmost section, which climbs 1,250 feet (380 m) in its first 0.75 miles (1.21 km) through steep rocky chutes that require scrambling and offer views of Storm King and Newburgh Bay. The entire trail, 4.6 miles (7.4 km) in length, continues over the mountain along the ridgetop to South Beacon Mountain.
- Camp Smith Trail: This 3.7-mile (6.0 km) trail follows a narrow corridor through of parkland between the National Guard base and the Bear Mountain Highway, traversing Anthony's Nose. It has many steep and rocky sections with views of Bear Mountain, the bridge and Haverstraw Bay to the south.
- Fishkill Ridge Trail: Starting from the Pocket Road trailhead in Beacon, this 4.9-mile (7.9 km) trail makes a large loop over that mountain, offering some views over Fishkill and southern Dutchess County along the way.
- Notch Trail: Formerly the Three Notch Trail, this 5.8-mile (9.3 km) trail follows wood roads from near the summit of Bull Hill, down into the col and up the north face of Breakneck Ridge. There it joins that trail for 1.3 miles (2.1 km) along the ridge, then descends the face of Sunset Point to Squirrel Hollow Brook and continues a long traverse across the lower slopes of South Beacon Mountain to reach Route 9D in Dutchess Junction south of Beacon, near Melzingah Brook.
- Osborn Loop: This 3.4 miles (5.5 km) trail connects to the AT near Canada Hill at both ends. It can be reached from Manitoga, the AT, or the trails around Sugarloaf Mountain.
- Undercliff Trail: A four-mile (6.4 km) route from Nelsonville to Breakneck Ridge that crosses the shoulder of Bull Hill along the way. It takes its name from the many cliffs whose foot it passes.
- Washburn Trail: The main route up Bull Hill from the Little Stony Point trailhead just north of Cold Spring climbs the mountain's 1,420 feet (430 m) in almost 2.3 miles (3.7 km). This is the greatest vertical ascent of any trail within the park.
- Wilkinson Memorial Trail: Longest trail in Hudson Highlands State Park at 9.5 miles (15.3 km). It begins along NY 9D just north of Breakneck Ridge and gradually ascends to cross all the summits of Scofield Ridge, the highest peak in Putnam County, located outside the park. It descends from there to Old Albany Post Road North, just off US 9 near the county line.

== See also ==
- List of New York state parks
