= Uncommon Valour =

Omnibus of novels by John Stevens

- Author: John Stevens
- Language: English
- Genre: Nautical fiction, Historical Fiction
- Publisher: Jada Press
- Publication date: June 2005
- Publication place: United States
- Media type: Print (trade paperback)
- Pages: 680 pp
- ISBN: 0-9764-1155-5

Uncommon Valour is an omnibus edition book containing two historical novels by John Stevens: The Frigate Captain and Broad Pendant. It was published by Jada Press, a small vanity press in Florida, in June 2005. The two novels, written in the epistolary style, tell the story of John Sinclair and William Mason, two Royal Navy officers during the American Revolution and runs from February through September in 1779. An epilogue to the main stories — appearing only in the omnibus — looks back on the events from the vantage point of 1852.

== The Frigate Captain ==
The "Frigate Captain" by John Stevens is a historical novel set in 1779. Published in 2005 as the first half of an omnibus edition titled Uncommon Valour. It follows the adventures of John Sinclair and William Mason, two Royal Navy officers, their friends and family. Sinclair is the English Captain of the frigate Sapphire just returning to sea after a wound that nearly killed him. Mason is the loyalist American Commander of the sloop-of-war Paladin. Other important characters are Mason's young wife Jennifer (Willis) Mason, his older brother Richard Mason III, younger brother Stephen Mason and younger sister Tara Mason; Sinclair's physician and best friend Fred Bassingford, his gigantic Scottish cox’n MacGregor, and the treacherous French Captain Montaigne.

=== Plot ===
The tale follows Sinclair as he readies his ship for sea, while crossing the Atlantic he encounters Mason returning to England with a key French spy, Leveque, as his prisoner the same man who had murdered Sinclair's wife sixteen years earlier. The two men strike up a friendship and Sinclair offers Mason the run of his estate while he recovers from a wound suffered while capturing Leveque.

Upon reaching Portsmouth Mason is surprised to find his younger brother Stephen, who had run away from home on a merchant vessel, and takes him under his wing. They travel to White Oaks, the Sinclair family estate in Thornbury, and settle in. While there Mason becomes involved in the hunt for Benjamin Willis, his wife's cousin and heir to the Willis Woolen Mills, who had embezzled money bankrupting the firm and fled with his mistress. Mason aids his friend and brother-in-law, Captain Michael Gilmore, in saving the mills.

In America Jennifer Mason has established an identity in New York as the widow of a young naval officer and from this position she acts as an agent for Admiral Lord St. John's intelligence network, aided by her friend Mary Stewart, the wife of Mason's cox’n Nicholas Stewart and under the supervision of her brother-in-law Dick Mason. When Dick receives word that his wife, also an agent, has been killed Jennifer leaves the spy business and starts doing charity work with the wives of the soldiers stationed in New York. Soon after her sister-in-law Tara Mason, worn down by caring for her father who had lost touch with reality following his wife's death two months earlier, comes to stay with them. Mary and Jennifer slowly begin nursing her back health while Dick sets sail for England in search of answers to his wife's murder.

While en route to New York, Sinclair captures the French frigate Enchanté captained by Henri-Albere Montaigne. Upon his arrival in the city he calls on Jennifer Mason and meets Tara, sparks fly between the two almost immediately despite a 24-year age difference. When Sinclair is attacked by three ruffians and seriously wounded Tara nurses him back to health and a deep abiding love blossoms between the two.

Back in England Will Mason has been promoted to Junior Post Captain and appointed to command the frigate Vanessa as a reward for his part in Leveque's capture. While he and Stephen are in London, Dick Mason meets up with them and then returns to Thornbury with them. There he learns that his wife Lucy survived the attack in February but was severely injured and has been in hiding since on the White Oaks estate. Investigations reveal that her attacker was none other than Benjamin Willis who was paid to kill her. The Mason brothers and their allies track Willis down in London; he is killed while attempting to escape but not before revealing that the man behind the attack on Lucy was her trusted bodyguard Lloyd, who was in fact a Spanish double agent. Dick swears to track the man down and someday bring him to justice.

In America, Sinclair, his wounds largely healed, returns to his ship but continues his romance with Tara. Shortly thereafter Montaigne escapes and with the aid of two hired confederates captures Tara and takes her to the Yankee prison on Pollepel Island at West Point where he intends to have her executed as a traitor and spy. Sinclair and a small force of picked men, including Bassingford and MacGregor, ride after them and arrive barely in time to save Tara from rape at the hands of the prison guards. They manage to occupy the prison but they are cut-off within its walls, awaiting relief from two regiments that were following them north.

Dr. Bassingford and Sinclair tend to Tara's wounds, primarily a dislocated shoulder, badly abused feet and psychological trauma. Once she seems more her old self Sinclair proposes to Tara and she accepts, but all is not sunshine for the northbound soldiers are being harried by skirmishers and slowed to a crawl while supplies within the prison are running out. Montaigne has convinced the Americans that they are all English spies and taunts them with threats of what he intends for Tara in French which none of the Yankees speak. But he is found out when George Washington and one of his aides arrives on the island. Incensed at such dishonorable behavior Washington sends the vile Frenchman home in disgrace and he and Sinclair, whom he had met years earlier, negotiate the release of the prisoners. They arrive in New York to find Tara's father, Richard Mason Jr., recovered and awaiting them, he gives his consent to their engagement as the story ends and it is clear that the two men are well on their way to being fast friends.

The story is picked up in Broad Pendant, the second half of the omnibus.

== Broad Pendant ==
Broad Pendant by John Stevens is a historical novel set in 1779. Published in 2005 as the second half of an omnibus edition titled Uncommon Valour. It continues the adventures of John Sinclair and William Mason, two Royal Navy officers, their friends and family. Sinclair is the English Captain of the frigate Sapphire on station in New York. Mason is a loyalist American Captain newly appointed to command the frigate Vanessa outfitting at Plymouth. Other important characters are Sinclair's fiancée Tara Mason who is Will Mason's younger sister, Will's wife Jennifer (Willis) Mason, father Richard Mason Jr., his older brother Richard Mason III, younger brothers Robert and Stephen Mason; Sinclair's physician and best friend Fred Bassingford, his gigantic Scottish cox’n MacGregor, and Patrick Franklin, Captain of the frigate Predator.

=== Plot ===
The tale picks up exactly were the previous volume, The Frigate Captain, left off with Mason at the Sinclair family estate of White Oaks following the death of his wife's treacherous cousin, Benjamin Willis, and Sinclair in New York following the action at Pollepel Island. Mason meets Captain Patrick Franklin and learns that he and Vanessa will be part of the escort for a convoy that will actually be carrying General Lord Cornwallis back to America, where he will take up a new command, aboard his brother Dick's Indiaman Resolute Star.

The convoy assembles in Ireland and sets sail in early June. Along the way trouble ensues aboard Vanessa. Will has taken his lay about brother Robert, a naval lieutenant, into his company but only as a Master's Mate, and has rated his younger brother Stephen a Midshipman. Stephen has been working hard and is fitting in well, but Robert is sullen, resentful, insubordinate, sneering toward his juniors and at times even violent — particularly to Stephen. His insolence to the newly commissioned third lieutenant earns him a sharp reprimand, but when he appears on deck both naked and roaring drunk Will has no choice but to have him flogged, much as he hates it, and cuts off his grog ration for the remainder of the voyage. Cut off from the rum Rob shows all the signs of being addicted to alcohol. Will and his devoutly religious Sailing Master, Elijah Boyd, work to cure him of his dependence on rum but it is slow going.

In New York rumors have begun that Sinclair and the others at Pollepel Island escaped by bartering secrets to General Washington. The first rumors suggest that he gave away shipping timetables but the stories rapidly escalate to passwords, signals and finally that the whole affair at Pollepel was nothing but a smokescreen for a clandestine meeting between Sinclair and Washington where the captain was paid £20,000 for betraying his country. After investigating, Sinclair becomes convinced that the man behind it all is Colonel the Honorable Charles Courtenay whom he had, had a disagreement with when the later had taken passage to America aboard Sapphire several months earlier. Together with Major Collins of the Provost Marshal's office they lay a trap to tempt Courtenay into revealing himself. The desperate gamble works, thinking Sinclair on his deathbed from a poisoning attempt Courtenay brags about having hired the three ruffians that attacked Sinclair when he first arrived in New York, slipping Capitaine Montaigne the knife that he used to escape in June, precipitating the affair at Pollepel Island, and having started the rumors and passed the secrets on to rebel agents; then done with his gloating, Courtenay attempts to smother Sinclair to death. But the poisoning story is a sham and Sinclair gives Courtenay the severe thrashing that he has earned. Major Collins, who had heard every word from the next room, arrests Courtenay for High Treason and Sinclair and his fiancée Tara are re-united.

At sea the convoy is nearing the American coast when the rebel frigate Lexington, formerly the Mason Line Indiamen Brave Star, under Mason's rebel cousin Geoff Quinn, attempts to slip into the convoy but is recognized and chased off by Vanessa and the sloop-of-war Sandfly. Shortly after the convoy drops anchor in New York and Mason boards Sapphire with sealed orders from Admiral Lord St. John: Captain Sinclair has been appointed Commodore over a squadron consisting of Sapphire, Predator, Vanessa, Sandfly and the former French frigate Enchanté which Sinclair had captured in April and was now renamed HMS Enchanted; the squadron is to seek out and destroy a combined American/French frigate squadron that has been wreaking havoc among loyalist shipping for months. Sinclair posts his first lieutenant, Bartholomew Jones, to command Enchanted and he immediately begins working up his crew.

At a party given in honor of Sinclair's hoisting his broad pendant Robert Mason shows up drunk and proceeds to insult everyone there. He is confronted in succession by Tara, Will, his father, and finally Sinclair before being confined to Vanessa. The next day Sinclair comes aboard and delivers both a painful thrashing and an acid-tongued dressing down that leaves Rob battered and both ashamed and repentant. With Mr. Boyd beside him he begins the long road back from the brink of damnation where he had teetered and reconciles with his family.

When news reaches New York of the enemy whereabouts the squadron sets sail for the long overdue confrontation while at the same time escorting the Mason ships Resolute Star and Star of Honour much of the way to the safety of the Mason home at Halifax. The squadron reaches the rebel base at Machias Bay but finds only two of the expected five enemy ships at anchor. Braving the fire of several shore batteries Sinclair attacks, laying a bombardment from offshore with his large ships while the smaller ones sweep inshore and engage the enemy directly. The French frigate Magicien is captured but not before battering Predator into a hulk, while the American brigantine Diamondback is sunk. Sinclair orders Franklin to transfer to the captured Magicien, soon renamed HMS Jaguar, scuttle Predator at the harbor mouth and with Sandfly in company to sail for Halifax with the prisoners as soon as possible, while he takes the rest of the squadron and searches for the other enemy vessels. Robert, who has acquitted himself with honor, is raised back up to lieutenant to fill a vacancy the action has left aboard Enchanted.

The next day the squadron's lookouts sight Resolute Star and Star of Honour being pursued by the remaining ships of the enemy squadron. Ordering the Mason ships to break off to the south Sinclair engages immediately. Enchanted faces off against the Yankee frigate Queen of France and manages to send her to the bottom with the aid of a well-timed rake from Sinclair, Mason and Vanessa engage Lexington and manage to board and capture her with the aid of Enchanted. Mason and his cousin square off in a duel when Quinn refuses to surrender, with Mason emerging triumphant, but in the melee Robert is badly wounded saving Stephen's life. The big French frigate Arronbourge is battered badly in action with Sapphire but manages to slip away in the gun-smoke and fog when Sinclair breaks off to answer Mason's request for Dr. Bassingford's aid. Despite his best efforts he is forced to amputate Robert's right hand and some of the forearm, shattered by a Yankee pistol ball, thus ending the naval career that he had only just reclaimed.

Once the squadron arrives at Halifax, the dockyard puts their damages to rights while the officers and crew make the rounds of several parties in their honor. Franklin undergoes a court martial for the loss of Predator but is speedily acquitted of any wrongdoing. The Masons prepare to leave Canada behind, relocating to England, and soon the squadron accompanied by Resolute Star and Brave Star, now back in Mason hands after Sinclair buys her himself and presents her to Richard Mason, are sailing eastward for the British Isles.

But there is yet a final obstacle in their way. There have been rumblings of war with Spain for months and now it has come. The squadron encounters three big Spanish frigates escorting three troopships in the St. George Channel bound for Ireland. Recognizing that the Spanish must be intending to ferment a rebellion in a land that was already sympathetic to the American cause Sinclair orders the Mason ships to sail south and engages at once. In a fierce battle two Spanish frigates are taken and the last one is sunk although Captain Jones is seriously wounded and Sandfly’s Commander Boothroyd is killed. Once their escorts have been defeated the troopships lower their colors.

Arriving in Bristol, Sinclair is knighted by His Highness Prince Edward Henry, Duke of Gloucester. The novel ends with the wedding of Sir John Sinclair and Tara Mason on the grounds of White Oaks two weeks later.

== Publication Details ==
- 2005, US, Jada Press ISBN 0-9764-1155-5, Publication Date 30 June 2005, TPB
