= Bald Hill (Hudson Highlands) =

Hill in Dutchess County, New York

- Location within New York

Highest point
- Elevation: 1,499 feet (457 m)
- Coordinates: 41°30′06″N 73°55′01″W

Geography
- Location: Dutchess County, New York, U.S.
- Topo map: USGS Wappingers Falls

Bald Hill is a hill located on the Hudson Highlands in Dutchess County, New York. It has an elevation of 1,499 feet (457 m). The hill is one of two peaks—Lamb's Hill is the other—located on the Fishkill Ridge Trail in Hudson Highlands State Park.

== Geology ==
Bald Hill is located on the Reading Prong.
