= Hudson Highlands =

Mountains on either side of the Hudson River in New York, US

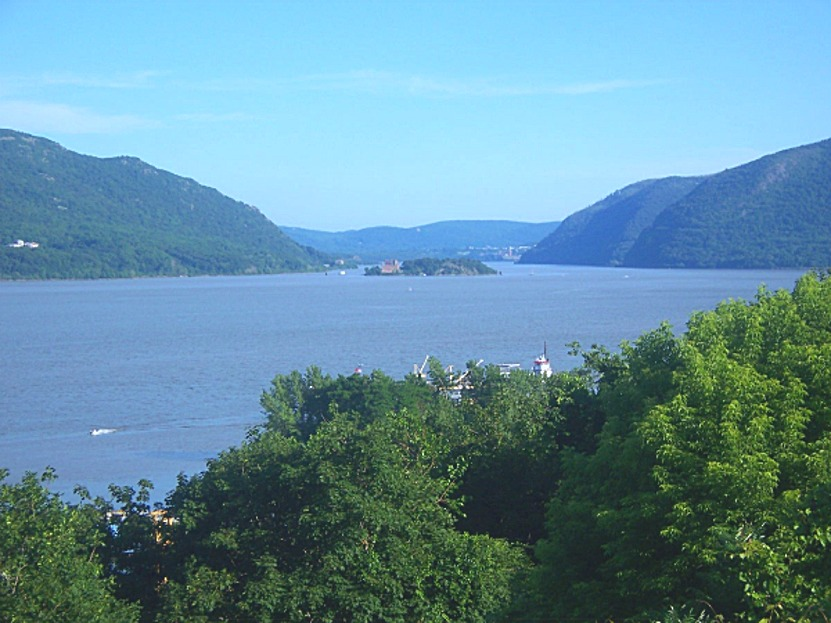
Wind Gate, the northern entrance to the Hudson Highlands, as seen from Newburgh. Breakneck Ridge is to the left, Storm King Mountain to the right with Bannerman's Island in the middle of the river and West Point visible in the distance

The Hudson Highlands are mountains on both sides of the Hudson River in New York state lying primarily in Putnam County on its east bank and Orange County on its west. They continue somewhat to the south in Westchester County and Rockland County, respectively. The highlands are a subrange of the Appalachian Mountains.

North to south they fall between Newburgh Bay and Haverstraw Bay, the latter forming the northern region of the New York - New Jersey Highlands.

The Hudson River enters this region in the south at Dunderberg Mountain near Stony Point, and from the north in the vicinity of Breakneck Ridge and Storm King Mountain near Cornwall, New York. These highlands have played a significant role in America's environmental, cultural, and military history.

== Geology ==
The bedrock of the Highlands is part of the Reading Prong and more than a billion years old, formed during the Grenville Orogeny. It represents the very core of the Appalachian range, which has been formed by successive mountain-building events (orogenies). The present mountains have been exposed by the process of isostasy through the late Cenozoic Era. The hills were given their rounded form when glaciers cut through the Appalachian Mountains here. The Highlands are among the lowest summits in that range, and the Appalachian Trail reaches its lowest elevation in the Trailside Zoo between Bear Mountain State Park and Bear Mountain Bridge. Conversely, the river becomes narrower and deeper through the Highlands, reaching its deepest point of 216 feet (66 m), near Garrison. Many stretches are challenging to navigate, earning nicknames like "World's End."

== History ==
Prior to European exploration, the Hudson Highlands were inhabited by Native American Lenape people. Henry Hudson and his crew on the Half Moon were the first Europeans known to see the Highlands when they explored the river in 1609.

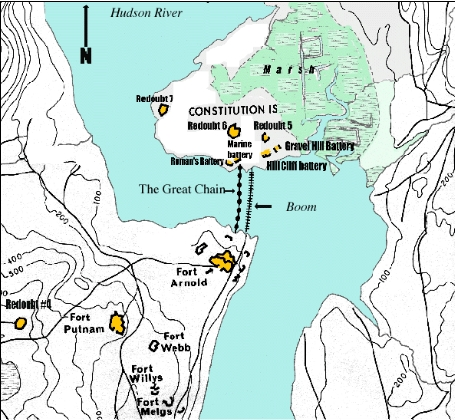
Map of West Point fortifications from 1775–1783, depicting the positioning of the Hudson River Chain, 1778-1782

The mountains became strategically important during the American Revolutionary War, when it was important for the Continental Army to hold the river valley and prevent the British from cutting New England off from the rest of the colonies. During the Revolutionary War, to prevent British shipping from using the river, the Hudson River Chain was forged at the Sterling Iron Works in Warwick, New York, a town in Orange County. From 1778 to 1782, the chain was stretched across the river from the Fort Clinton at West Point. The site of the fort is today the easternmost point of the grounds of the United States Military Academy. The only surviving piece of the boom and chain is currently on display at Washington's Headquarters State Historic Site in Newburgh, New York.

Several decades after independence, Thomas Cole started an artistic movement by painting America's wild and rugged landscapes— especially, at first, the Highlands— with the stark contrasts and shadows they offered, in a way that suggested raw nature, a world reborn. After the movement had faded, a critic derisively referred to the movement as the Hudson River School; the name stuck as the label for the new nation's first homegrown artistic movement.

In the early 20th century, in response to damage caused by quarrymen and loggers in the Highlands, local conservationists began to press for public ownership of the area's woods and mountains. Their efforts paid off in the first of several state parks that now blanket the chain.

Later that century, an ambitious power-generating plan that would have dug into Storm King Mountain led to a landmark lawsuit by environmental groups that made history when the judge ruled that aesthetic impacts of such large projects could be considered and that a coalition of citizen groups had legal standing. This landmark lawsuit formed the basis for a large body of case law concerning environmentalism.

== Mountains of the Hudson Highlands ==
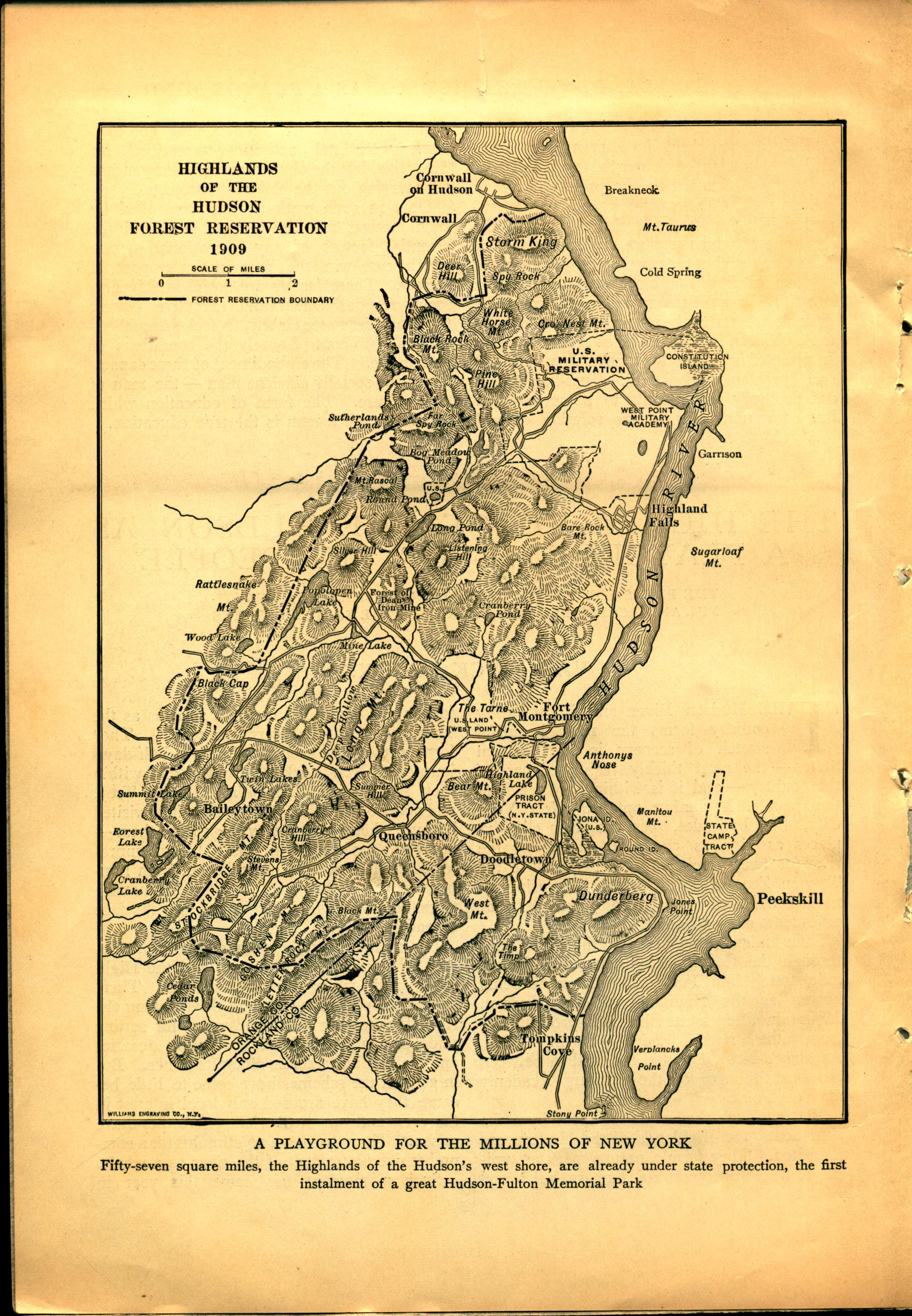
Highlands of the Hudson Forest Reservation 1909

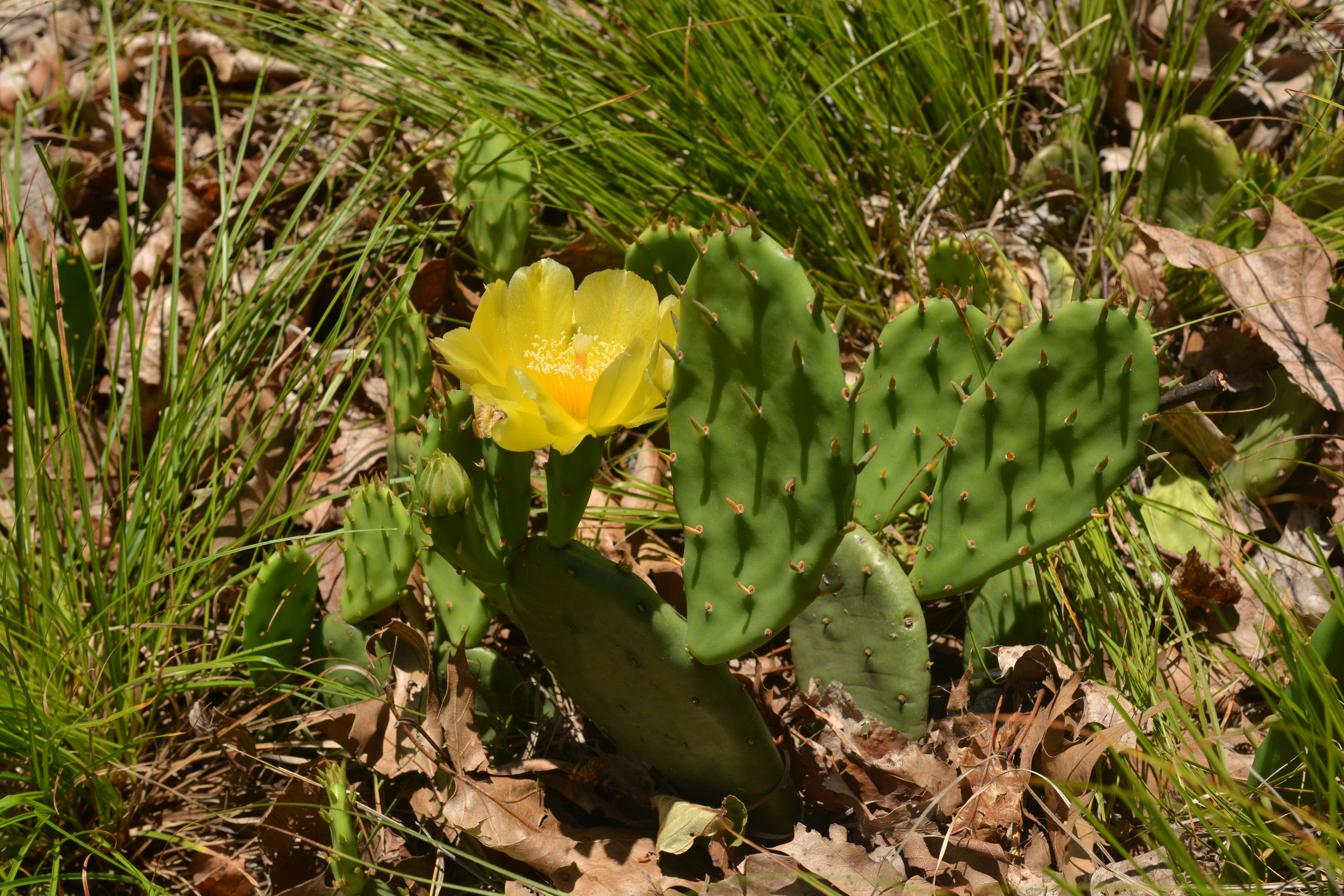
Opuntia humifusa (Eastern prickly pear cactus) in bloom atop Sugarloaf Hill in the Hudson Highlands

East (north to south)

- Bald Hill
- Lamb's Hill
- Lamb's Hill West
- Beacon Mountain (North and South)
- Scofield Ridge (highest point in Putnam County, in Philipstown)
- Sugarloaf Mountain
- Breakneck Ridge
- Bull Hill aka Mt. Taurus
- South Redoubt and North Redoubt aka Fort Hill
- Fort Defiance Hill
- Denning Hill
- Sunset Point
- Sugarloaf Hill
- White Rock
- Canada Hill
- Anthony's Nose
- Manitou Mountain

West (north to south)

- Storm King Mountain
- Black Rock
- Crow's Nest
- Popolopen Torne
- Bear Mountain
- West Mountain
- Bald Mountain
- Spy Rock
- Eagles Cliff
- Dunderberg Mountain
- Long Mountain
- Sutherland Ridge
- Stillman Hill
- Arthur Hill
- Chatfield Hill
- Buckberg

== Protected areas of the Hudson Highlands ==
- Bear Mountain State Park
- Black Rock Forest
- Harriman State Park
- Hudson Highlands State Park
- Manitoga
- Sterling Forest State Park
- Storm King State Park

== Gallery ==
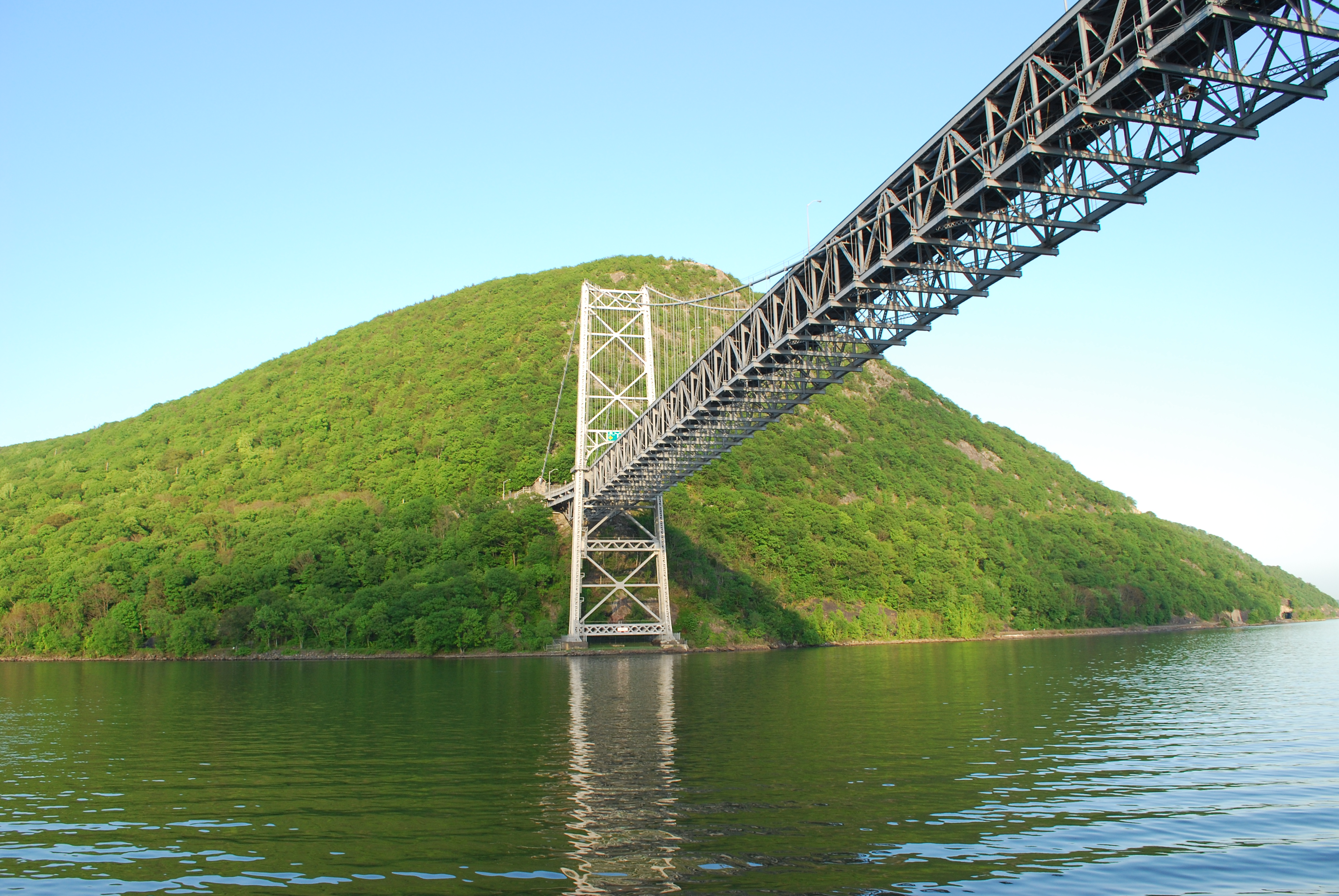
View from Hudson River looking east with Bear Mountain Bridge in foreground

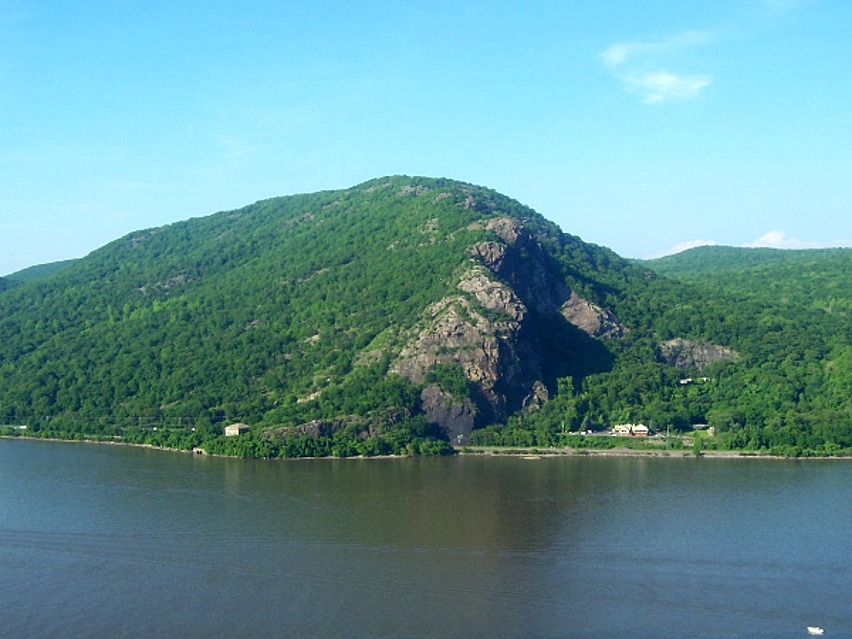
Breakneck Ridge from across the Hudson River

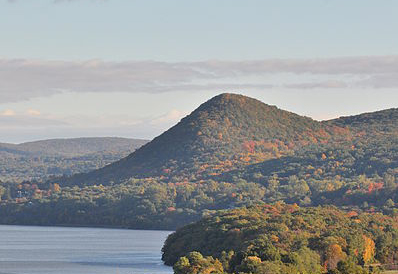
Sugarloaf Hill on the east bank of the river

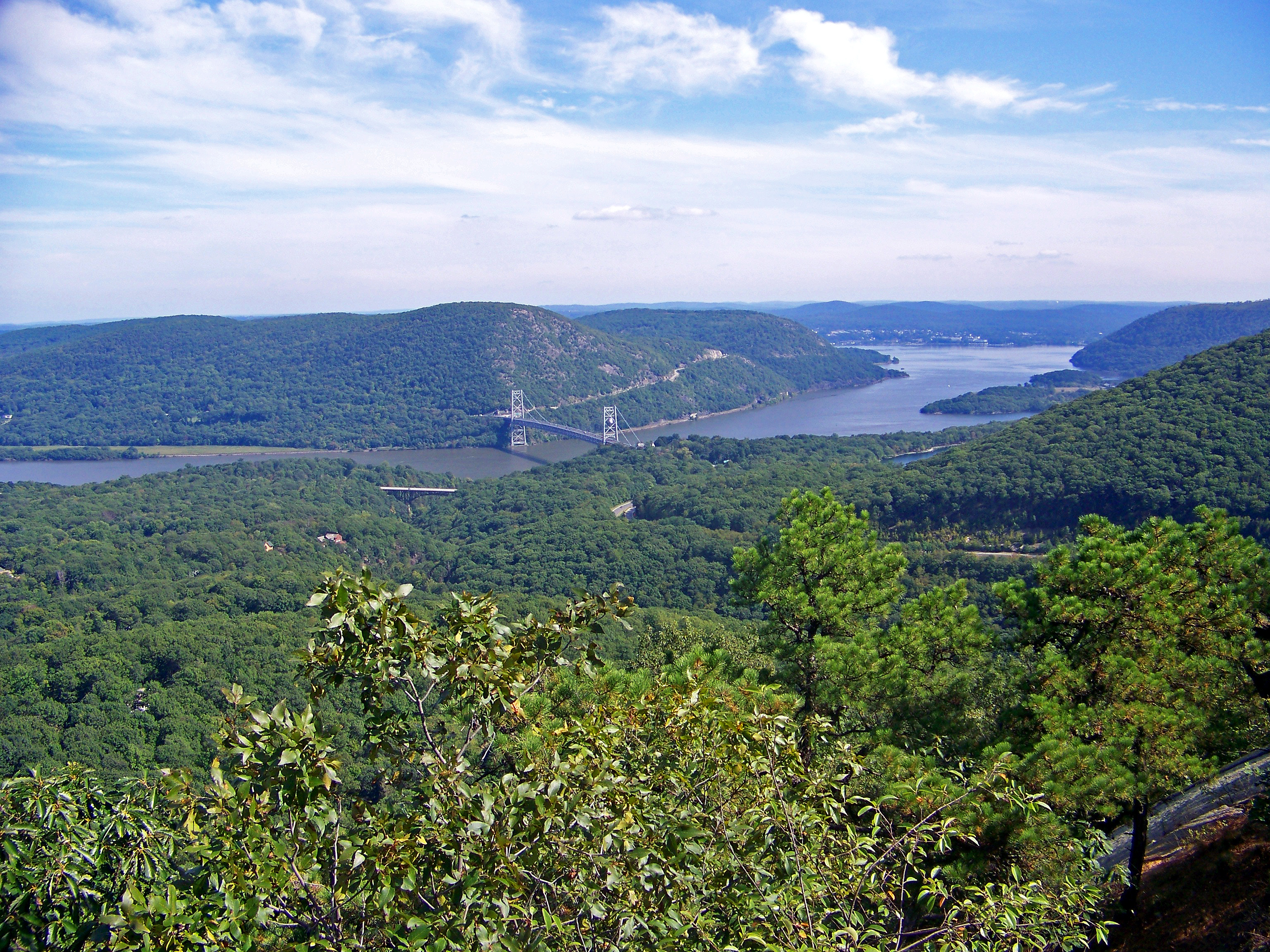
Looking east from Popolopen Torne, with Bear Mountain Bridge across the Hudson River

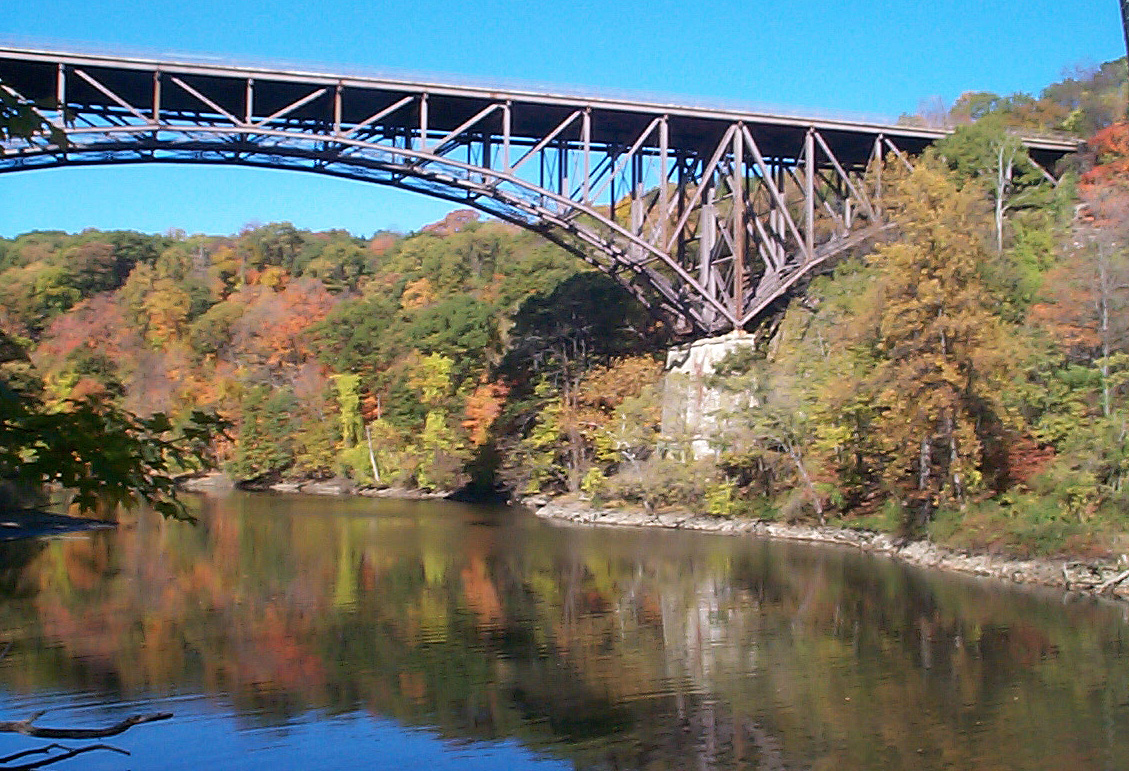
Popolopen Bridge on US Route 9W

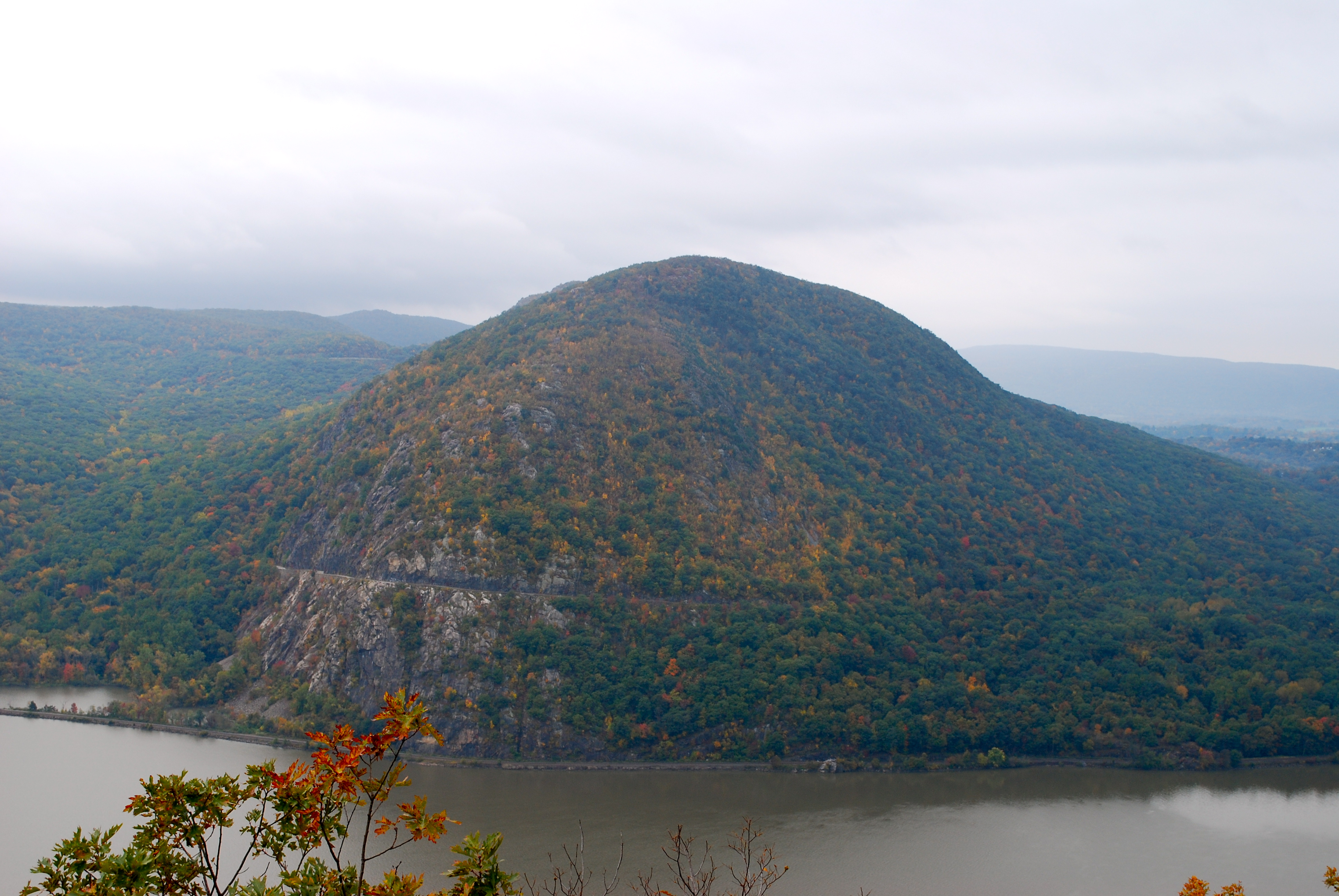
Storm King and New York State Route 218 as seen from atop Breakneck Ridge

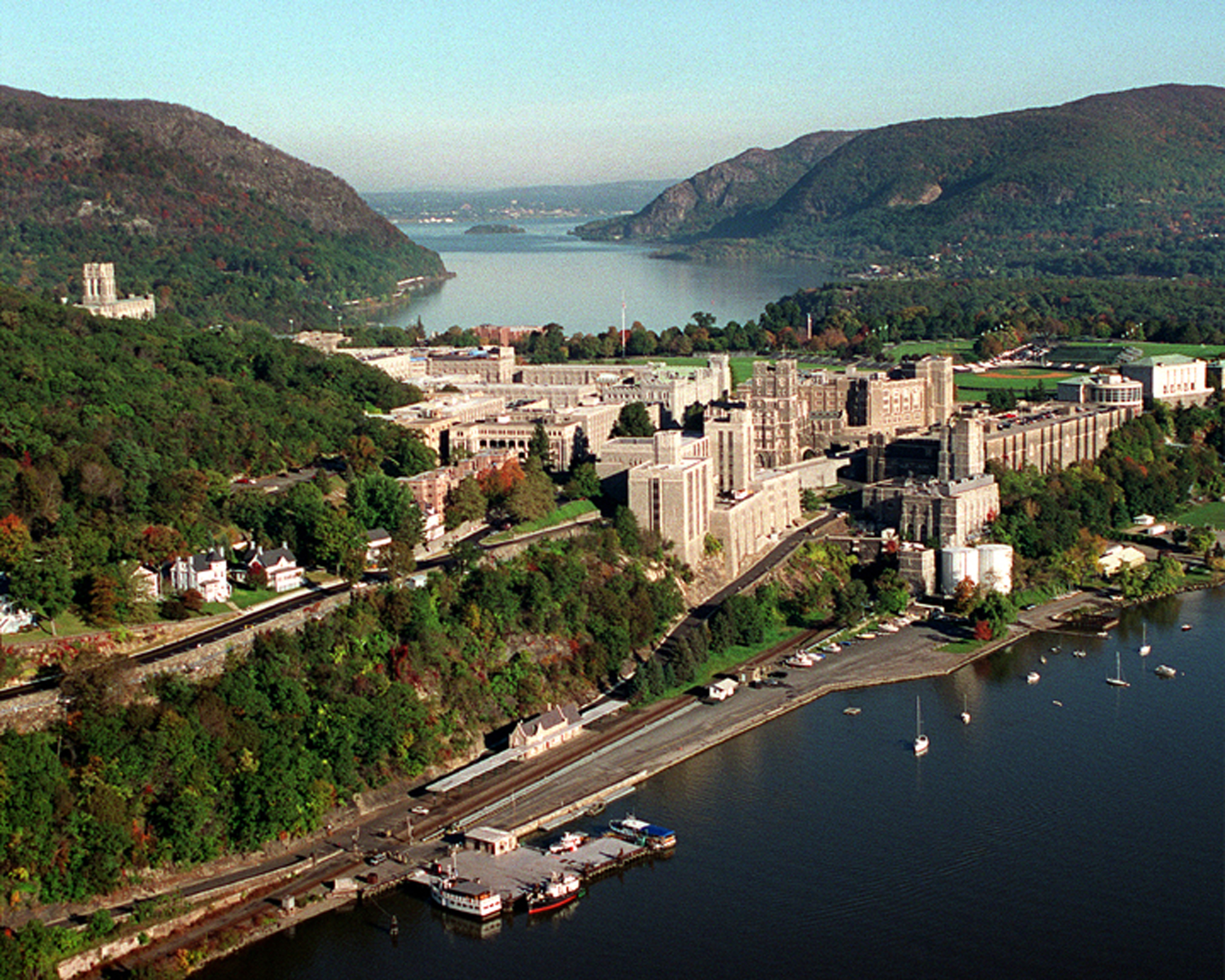
Central campus of West Point looking north

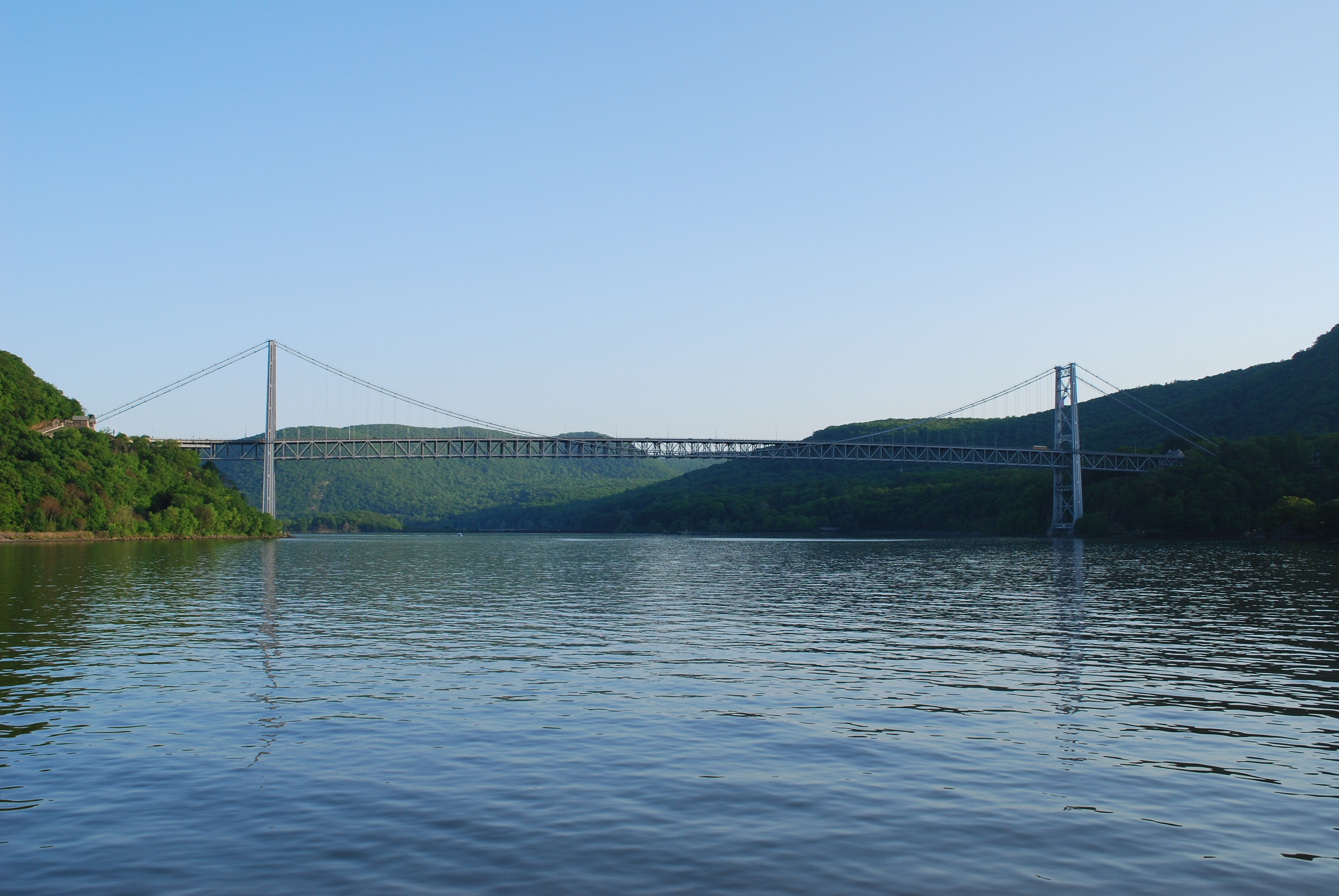
Looking south towards the Bear Mountain Bridge

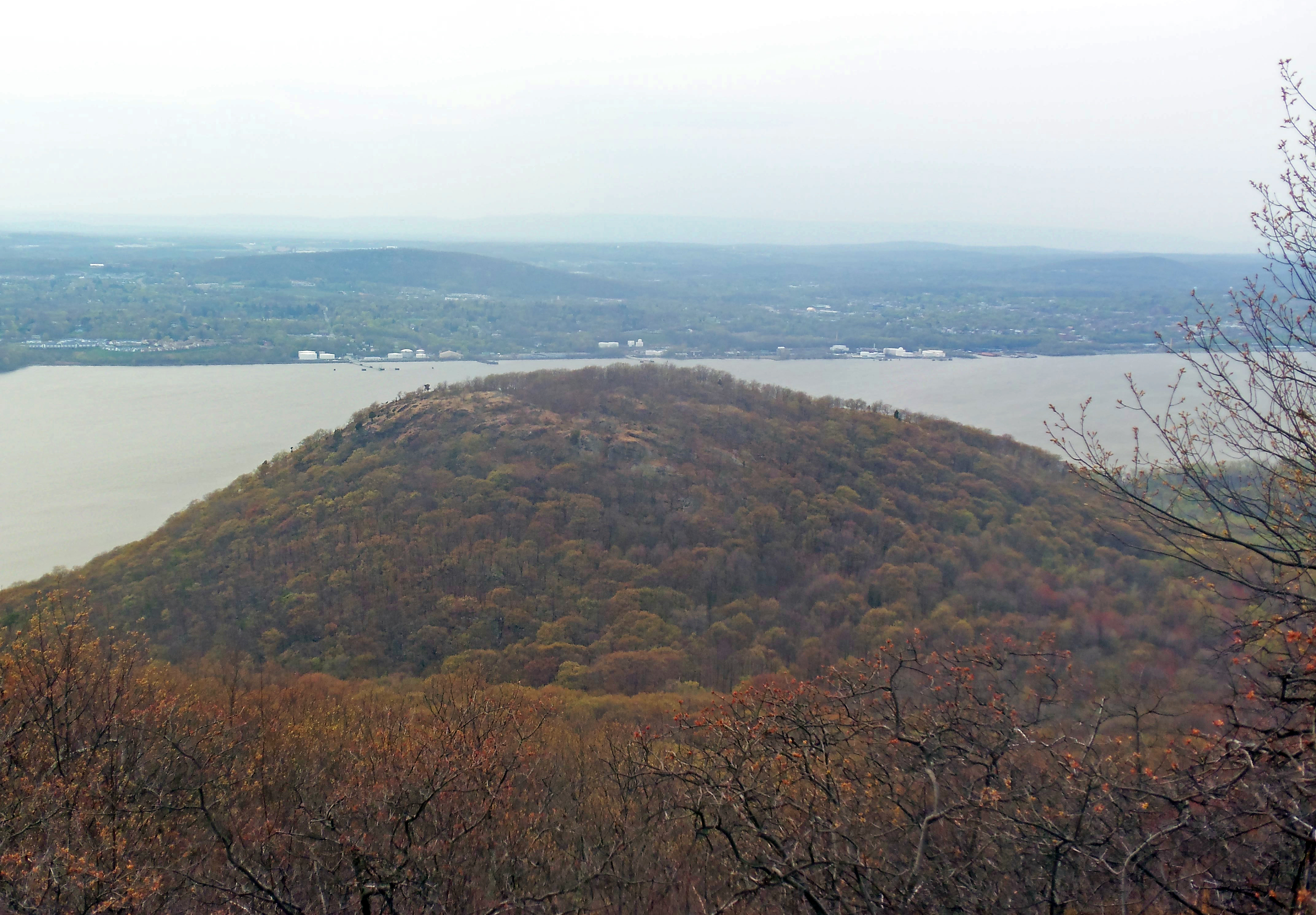
Sugarloaf Mountain from the Breakneck Bypass Trail

== See also ==
- List of subranges of the Appalachian Mountains
