= Sugarloaf Hill (Putnam County, New York) =

Mountain in New York, United States

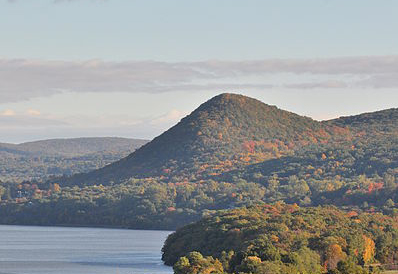
- Looking north towards Sugarloaf Hill from the Bear Mountain Bridge

Highest point
- Elevation: 785 ft (239 m)
- Coordinates: 41°21′39″N 73°56′47″W

Geography
- Location: Philipstown, New York, U.S.
- Parent range: Hudson Highlands
- Topo map: USGS Peekskill

Climbing
- Easiest route: hiking trail

Sugarloaf Hill is a 785 ft (239 m) peak along the Hudson River in Putnam County, New York, part of the Hudson Highlands. It was named by the Dutch for its resemblance in outline to a sugarloaf when sailing up the river towards it.

== Topography ==
Sugarloaf Hill is part of a ridge running northeast and southwest close to the east shore of the Hudson. The peak of Castle Rock lies off the northeast end of the ridge, while NY 9D runs along the west side. A small stream runs along the southeast side and flows into the Hudson, while to the northwest, the ground declines gently to the Hudson.

The hill is 785 feet (239 m) high at its summit, towards the middle of the ridge. A red-blazed trail climbs its western side, and then runs along the ridge, across the summit, to end at a viewpoint over the Hudson of about 700 feet (210 m) elevation.

== Flora ==
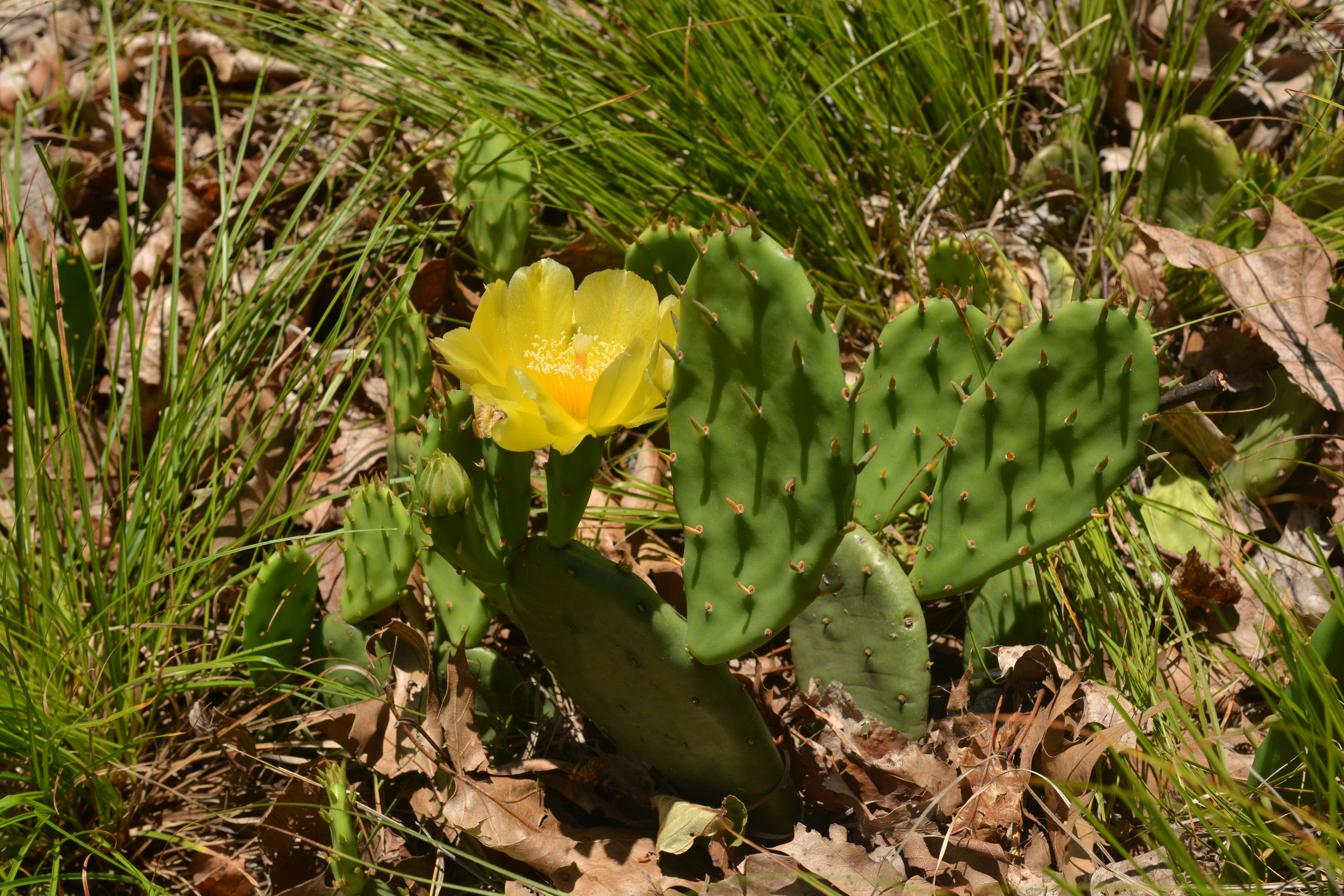
Opuntia humifusa (Eastern prickly pear cactus) in bloom atop Sugarloaf Hill

Somewhat unusually, Opuntia humifusa, Eastern prickly-pear cactus, can be found growing on ledges atop Sugarloaf Hill. The oceanic warmth brought upstream by the estuarine Hudson and the sunny, exposed rock allows this cactus to grow on the hill, and elsewhere in the Hudson Highlands.

== History ==
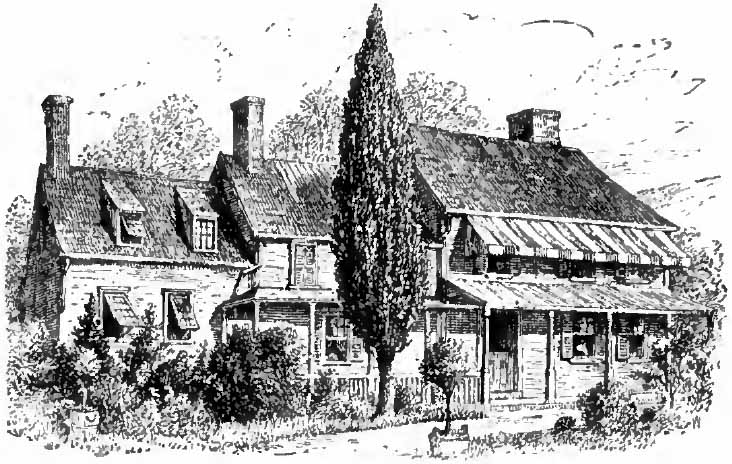
Col. Beverley Robinson's house, occupied by Benedict Arnold as his headquarters

Beverley, the house of Col. Beverley Robinson, was built at the foot of the peak in 1758. Robinson, a Tory, lost his house and estates there to confiscation in 1777. It was used as a headquarters by several American generals during the Revolution, and Benedict Arnold chose to dwell there when he took command of West Point in 1780. It was at Beverley that Arnold learned of the capture of John André and the failure of his treason, and fled thence to HMS Vulture.

Beverley later passed into the hands of Hamilton Fish, and was destroyed by a fire in 1892. The hill was donated by the Osborn family to the Taconic State Park Commission in 1974, and now forms part of the Osborn Preserve of Hudson Highlands State Park.
