= Breakneck Ridge =

Mountain in the United States

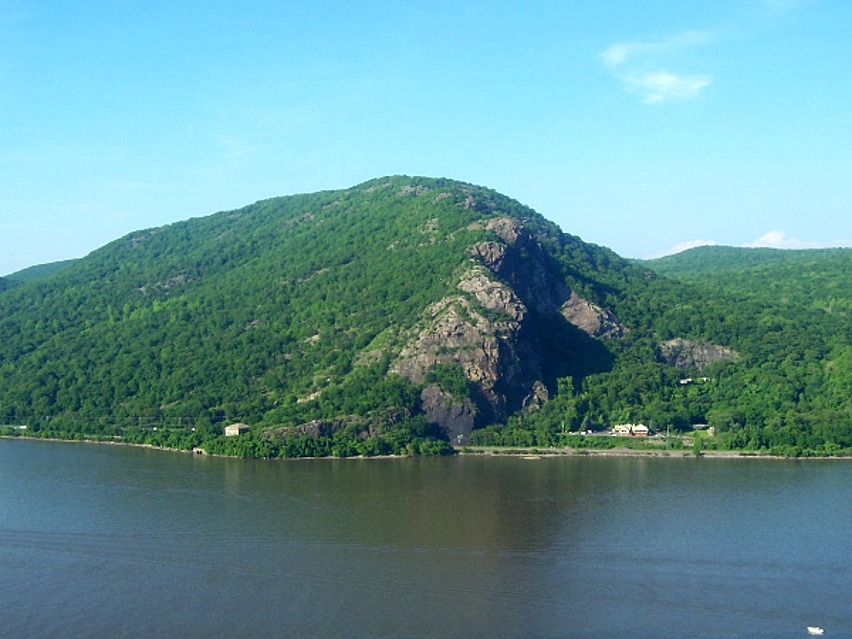
- Breakneck Ridge from across the Hudson River

Highest point
- Elevation: 1,260 ft (380 m)
- Prominence: 527 ft (161 m)
- Coordinates: 41°27′35″N 73°57′32″W

Geography
- Location: North Highlands / Fishkill, New York, U.S.
- Parent range: Hudson Highlands
- Topo map: USGS West Point

Climbing
- Easiest route: Trail

Breakneck Ridge is a mountain along the Hudson River between Beacon and Cold Spring, New York, straddling the boundary between Dutchess and Putnam counties. Its distinctive rocky cliffs are visible for a long distance when approached from the south, and together with Storm King Mountain on the opposite bank of the river forms Wey-Gat, or Wind Gate, the picturesque northern gateway to the Hudson Highlands.

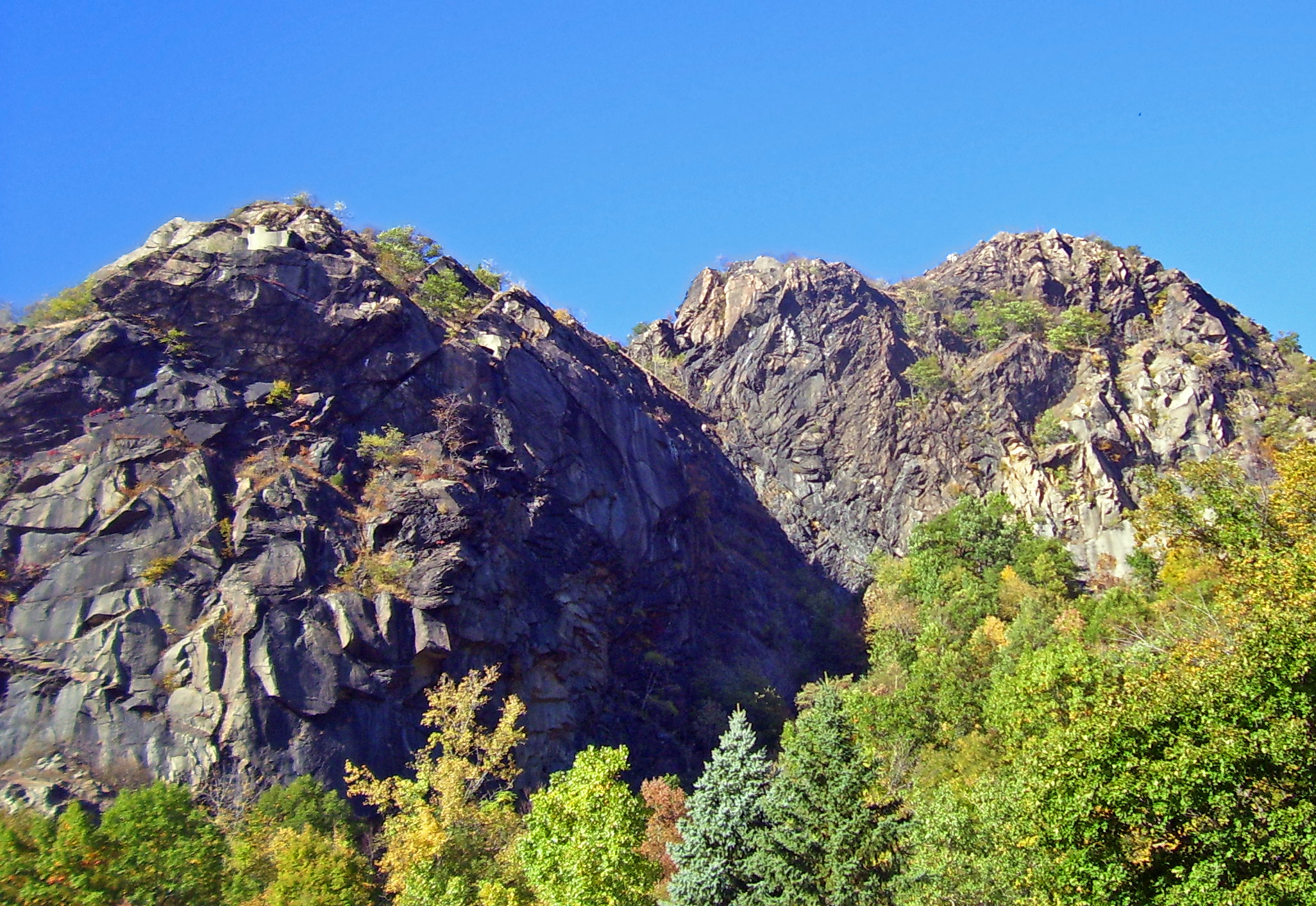
Former quarries on south side of ridge.

It has several summits, the highest, some distance inland, reaching approximately 1,260 feet (384 m) above sea level. The southern face of the peak is known for its striking cliffs, the result of quarrying in past years. Lying within Hudson Highlands State Park, it offers views of the river and region and is quite popular with hikers, to the point that a rail flag stop has been established on the Metro North line which runs right by the base of the ridge along NY 9D. In 1932 a road tunnel was dug below the western slopes of the peak; it is now designated as part of Route 9D.

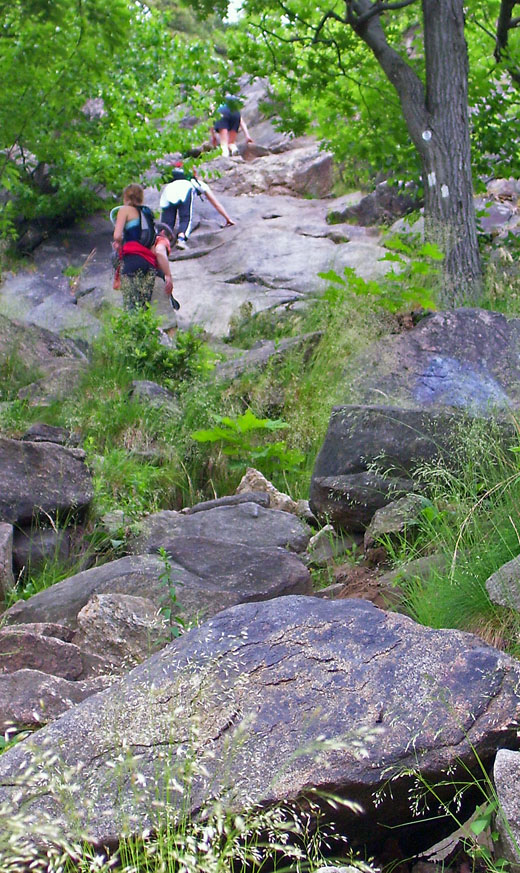
Hikers working their way up the mountain.

== Approach ==
While several routes exist, most hikers take the white-blazed route up the mountain's west face that begins on the West (Southbound) side of Route 9D near the tunnel. After circling around to cross above the tunnels, it begins a steep, rocky and challenging climb up to the first bump of the mountain, about 720 feet (219 m) above the river, where there are views of the river and Highlands. It continues in a similar fashion over the remaining bumps until it reaches the summit, but keeps on going and becomes a trail that travels over several other summits, and eventually peters out at Beacon Fire Tower from which hikers have the option to turn around and return the same way. However, there are other small trails that lead down from the white trail, as there are blue, red, and green trails that ascend from the various other summits that the white blazed trail crosses over. They serve as a shortcut to the base of the mountain as well as trails which lead to other parts of the greater Hudson Highlands State Park area.

The Ninham Trail, named after former Wappinger chief Daniel Ninham, opened in July 2021 as an alternate route to ascend Breakneck Ridge and to provide a safer option for less experienced hikers to descend the mountain. The new trail has more than 500 stairs made from stones hand cut from Breakneck Ridge. After the opening of the Ninham Trail, the Breakneck Ridge ascent (white trail) was converted to a one-way, up only trail.

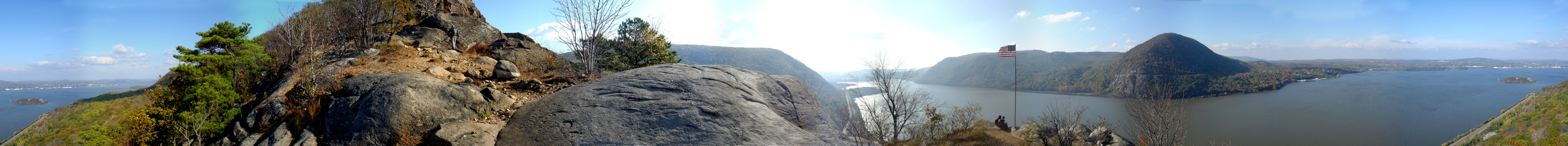
Panorama of Storm King Mt and the Hudson River from the first viewpoint of Breakneck Ridge
