= Pollepel Island =

Uninhabited island in the Hudson River in New York, USA

Coordinates: 41°27′19″N 73°59′20″W

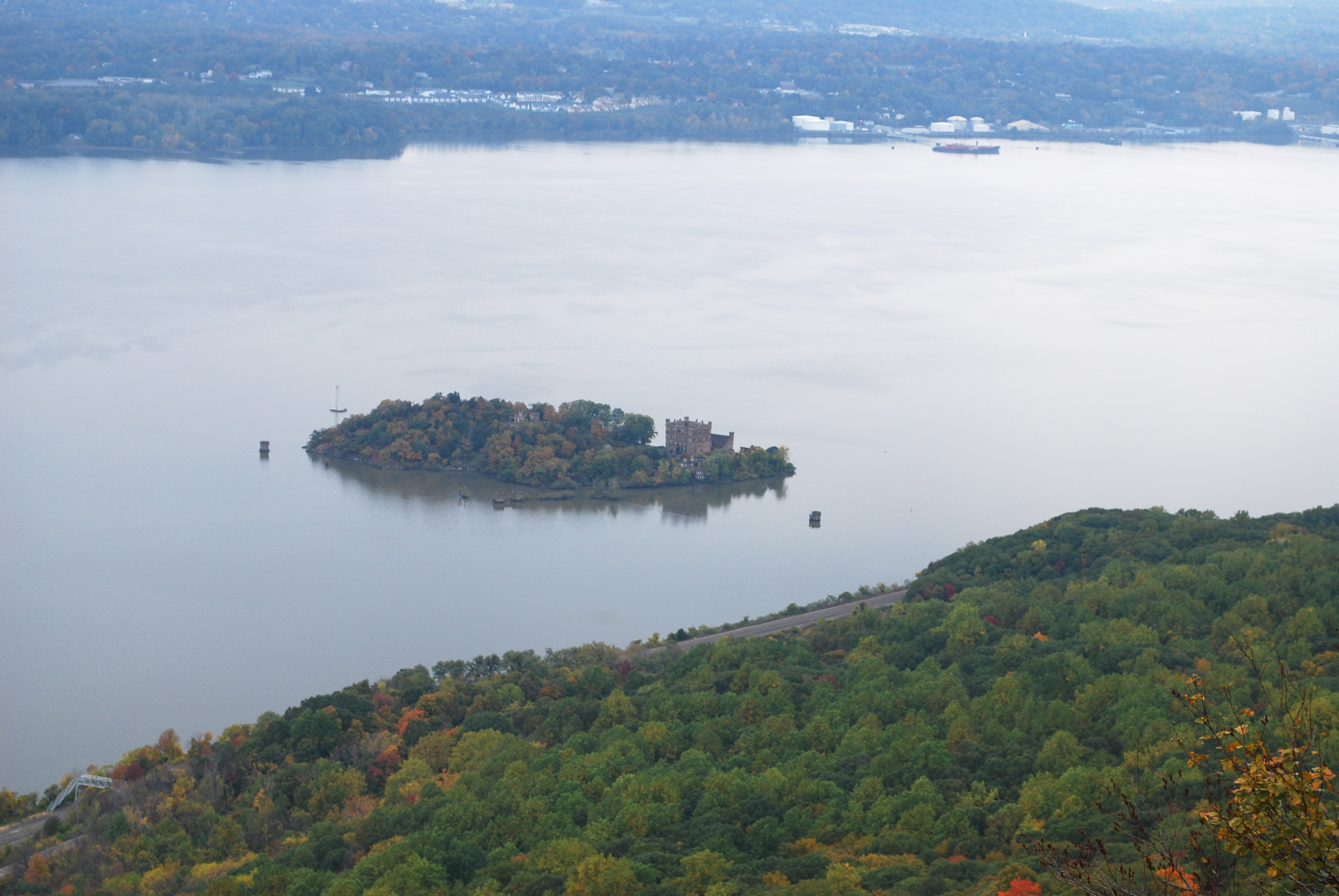
The island and castle viewed from atop Breakneck Ridge

Pollepel Island /pɒlɪˈpɛl/ is a 6.5-acre (26,000 m^{2}) uninhabited island in the Hudson River in New York, United States. The principal feature on the island is Bannerman's Castle, an abandoned military surplus warehouse.

== Description ==
Pollepel Island has been called many different names, including Pollopel Island, Pollopel's Island and Bannerman's Island, Pollepel is a Dutch word meaning "(pot) ladle"

The island is about 50 miles (80 km) north of New York City and about 1,000 feet (300 m) from the Hudson River's eastern bank. It covers about 6.5 acres (26,000 m^{2}), most of it rock.

== Early history ==
Europeans first encountered Pollepel Island during the first navigation of the Hudson River by early Dutch settlers in the Province of New York, at the "Northern Gate" of the Hudson Highlands. During the Revolutionary War, patriots attempted to prevent the British from passing upriver by emplacing 106 chevaux de frise (upright logs tipped with iron points) between the island and Plum Point across the river (see Hudson River Chains). Caissons from several chevaux de frise still rest at the river bottom. Still, these obstructions did not stop a British flotilla from burning Kingston in 1777. General George Washington later signed a plan to use the island as a military prison; however, there is no evidence that a prison was ever built there.

== Bannerman's Castle ==
- Bannerman's Island Arsenal
- U.S. National Register of Historic Places
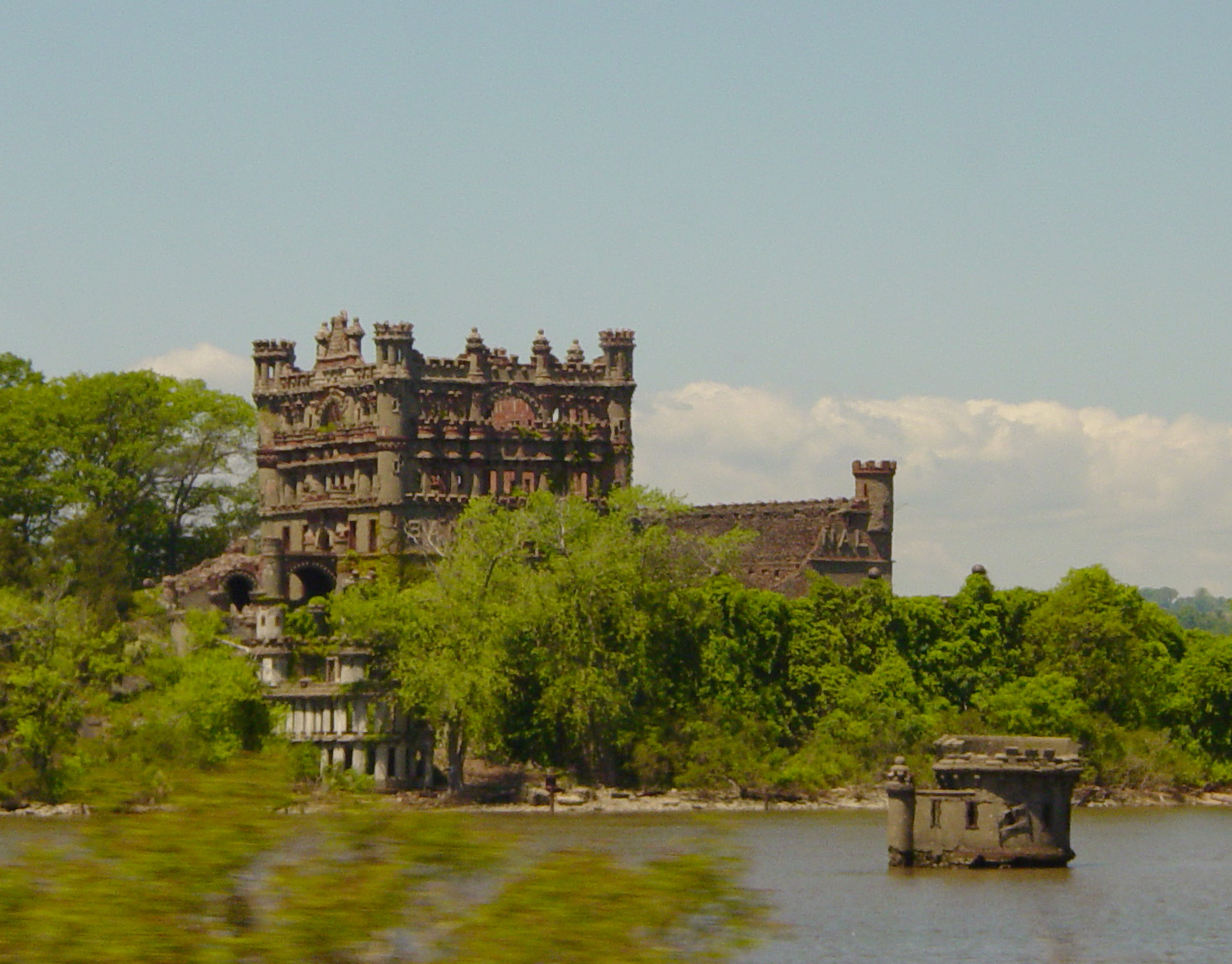
- Remains of Bannerman Castle viewed from the railroad on the eastern bank of the Hudson River, circa 2003

- Location within New York Location within the United States
- Location: Pollepel Island, Newburgh, New York
- Area: 13.4 acres (5.4 ha)
- Built: 1901
- Architect: Bannerman, Francis VI
- MPS: Hudson Highlands MRA
- NRHP reference No.: 82001121
- Added to NRHP: November 23, 1982

=== Origin ===
Francis Bannerman VI was born on March 24, 1851, in Scotland, and immigrated to the United States with his parents in 1854. His grandfather was from Dundee, Scotland, where he worked as a "linenman". The family moved to Brooklyn in 1858 and began a military surplus business near the Brooklyn Navy Yard in 1865, purchasing surplus military equipment at the close of the American Civil War.

In 1867, the business occupied a ship chandlery on Atlantic Avenue engaged in the purchase of worn rope for papermaking. The store on the 500-block of Broadway opened in 1897 to outfit volunteers for the Spanish–American War. The business bought weapons directly from the Spanish government before it evacuated Cuba; and then purchased over 90 percent of the Spanish guns, ammunition, and equipment captured by the United States military and auctioned off by the United States government. Bannerman's illustrated mail order catalog expanded to 300 pages, and later became a reference for collectors of antique military equipment.

Bannerman purchased Pollepel Island in November 1900, for use as a storage facility for his growing surplus business. Because his storeroom in New York City was not large enough to provide a safe location to store thirty million surplus munitions cartridges, in the spring of 1901, he began to build an arsenal on Pollepel. Bannerman designed the buildings himself and let the constructors interpret the designs on their own.

Most of the building was devoted to storing army surplus. Still, Bannerman built another castle, on a smaller scale, atop the island near the main structure as a residence, often using items from his surplus collection for decorative touches. The castle, clearly visible from the shore of the river, served as a giant advertisement for his business. On the side of the castle facing the western bank of the Hudson, Bannerman cast the legend "Bannerman's Island Arsenal" into the wall.

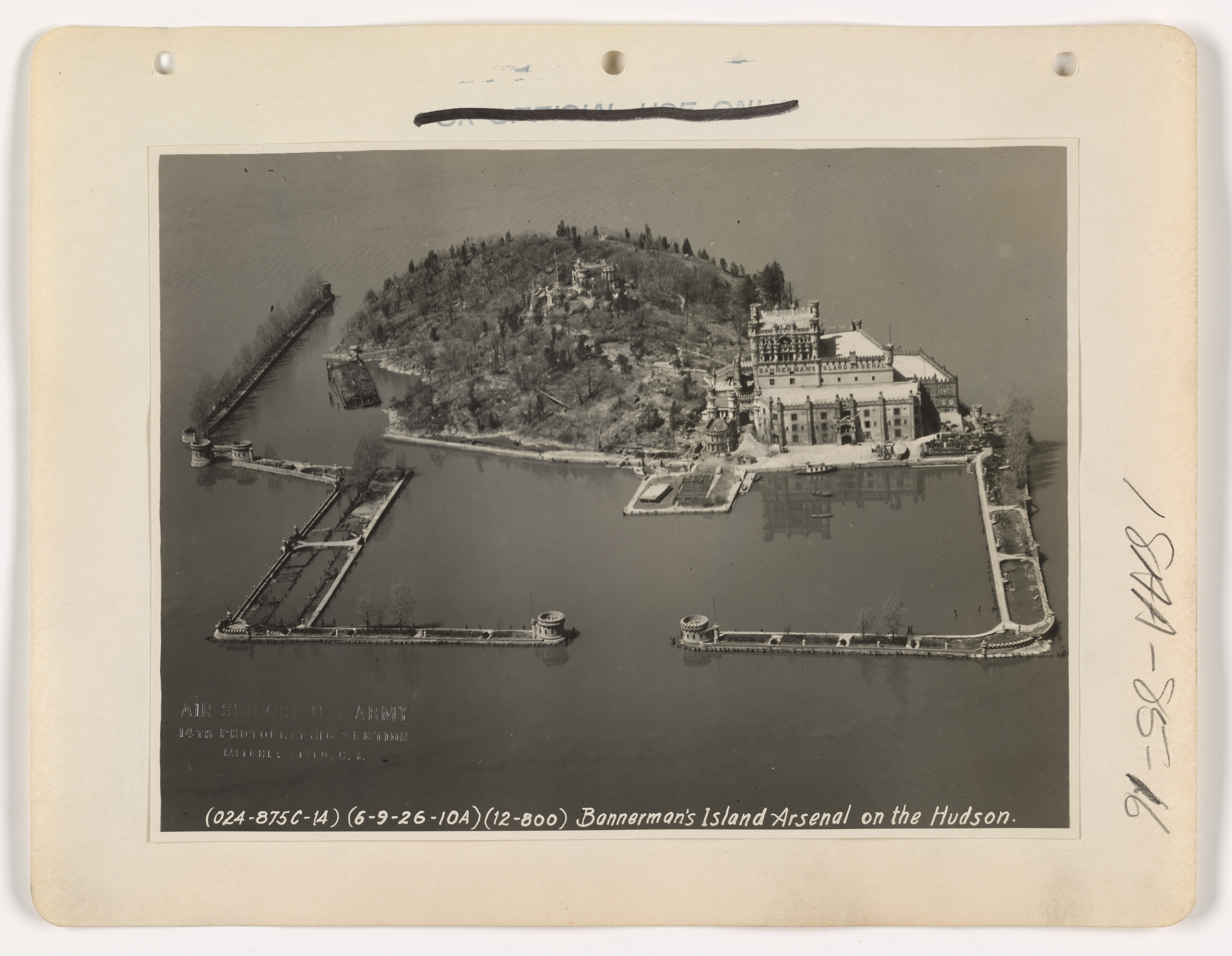
Bannerman's Island Arsenal, signage is below the crenellations at the top.

Circa 1900–1910, the US Navy re-gunned several older ships. Bannerman bought the old guns, presumably at scrap value. In 1917, following the American entry into World War I, Bannerman sold a number of these weapons to the US Army, which intended to mount them on new carriages as field guns for the Western Front. The Army acquired thirty 6-inch (152 mm) 30-caliber ex-Navy guns, but sources do not indicate whether it sent any of them to France. The Army's 6-inch gun units in France primarily used former Army coast defense weapons; none of these units completed training and thus did not see action.

Construction ceased at Bannerman's death in 1918. In August 1920, 200 pounds of shells and powder exploded in an ancillary structure, destroying a portion of the complex. Bannerman's sales of military weapons to civilians declined in the early 20th century due to state and federal legislation. After the sinking of the ferryboat Pollepel, which had served the island, in a storm in 1950, the arsenal and the island were left essentially vacant. Jackson Hole Preserve, Inc. bought the island and gifted the land to New York State in 1967. The state took possession after the old military equipment had been removed, and donated relics to the Smithsonian Institution. For a short time, tours of the island were given in 1968. However, on August 8, 1969, fire devastated the arsenal, destroying the roofs and floors. Following the fire, the island was placed off-limits to the public.

=== Current status ===
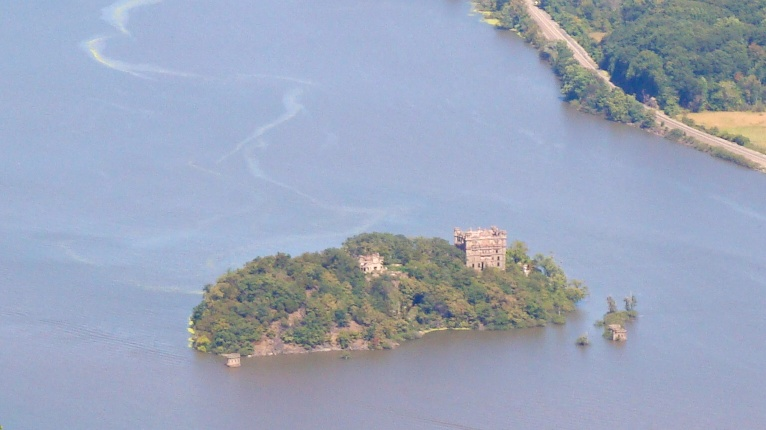
Pollepel Island viewed from Storm King Mountain

In the 21st century, the castle is the property of the New York State Office of Parks, Recreation and Historic Preservation and is mostly in ruins. While portions of the exterior walls still stand, all the internal floors and non-structural walls have since burned down. The island has been the victim of vandalism, trespass, neglect, and decay. Several old bulkheads and causeways that submerge at high tide present a serious navigational hazard. On-island guided tours were made available in 2004 through the Bannerman's Castle Trust. The castle is easily visible to riders of the Metro-North Railroad Hudson Line and the Amtrak Empire Corridor lines. One side of the castle, which carries the words "Bannerman's Island Arsenal", is also visible to southbound riders.

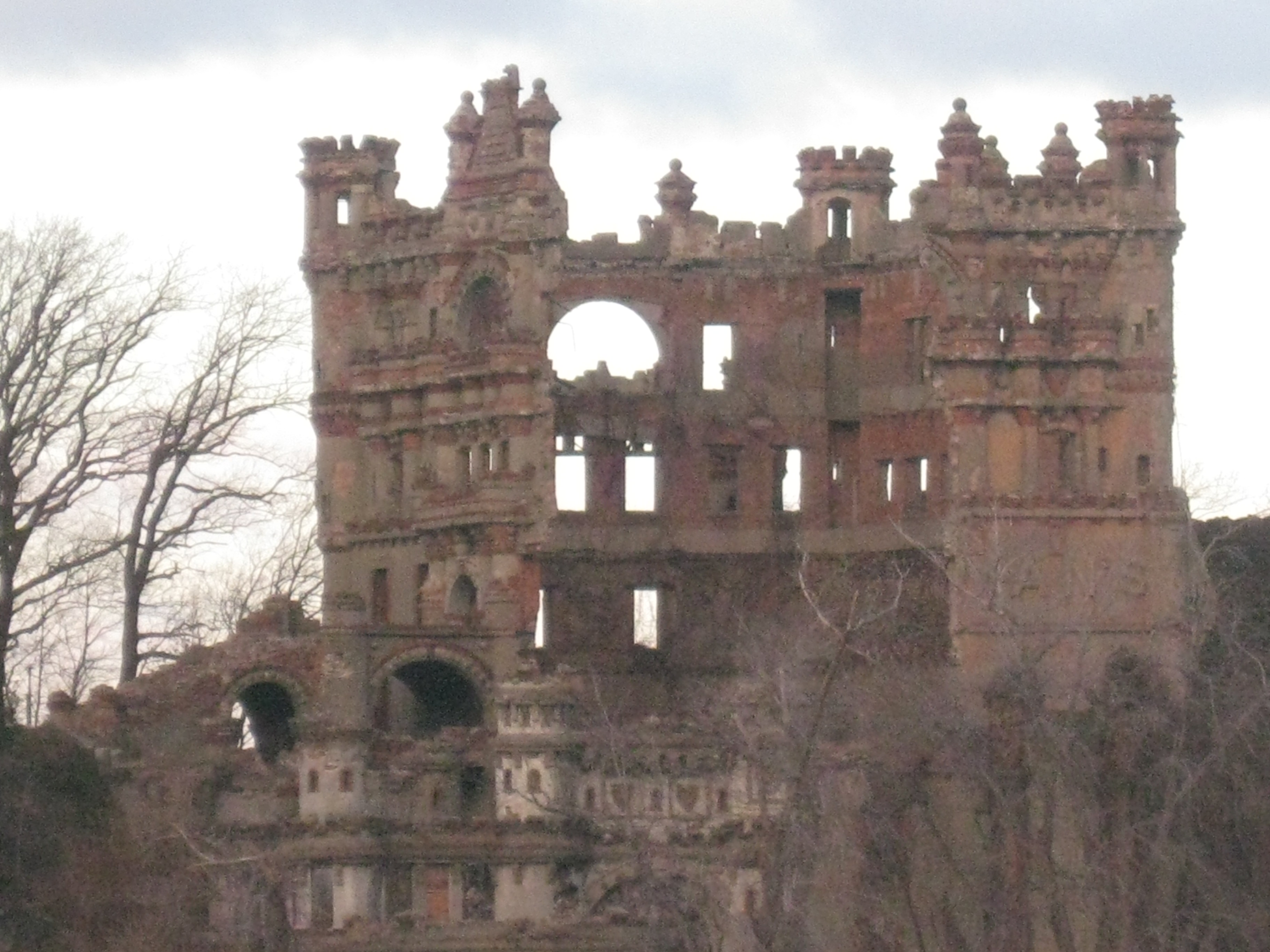
The collapsed wall viewed from shore

Sometime during the week before December 28, 2009, parts of the castle collapsed. Officials estimate 30–40 percent of the structure's front wall and about half of the east wall fell. The collapse was reported by a motorist and by officials of Metro-North.

On April 19, 2015, the island was the destination of a kayak trip taken by Vincent Viafore and his fiancée, Angelika. Viafore drowned, and Angelika was charged with his murder. On July 24, 2017, she pled guilty to criminally negligent homicide and served a short time in prison.

On June 28, 2015, the public art piece Constellation by Beacon-based artist Melissa McGill debuted on and around the castle ruins. The work consists of seventeen LEDs mounted on metal poles of varying heights, which when lighted for two hours each night are intended to create the appearance of a new constellation.

The island is maintained by The Bannerman Castle Trust, a nonprofit organization of volunteers that secures funding to stabilize and improve structures on Pollepel Island and to educate the public about the island's history. The Trust also offers guided tours of the island.

== In popular culture ==
=== In literature ===
Bannerman Castle by Barbara Gottlock and Thom Johnson was released through Arcadia Press in August 2006. The book contains almost 200 vintage photographs, and the authors' text documents the island's growth and decline. Proceeds from the book go to the Bannerman Castle Trust in its ongoing efforts to preserve and improve the island's structures. Wesley Gottlock and Barbara H. Gottlock authored a children's book titled "My Name is Eleanor".

The main characters in Adventures of a Cat-Whiskered Girl by Daniel Pinkwater (2010), set in the 1950s, visit Pollepel Island and hang out with a family of trolls who are squatting in the abandoned castle.
