= Newburgh Bay =

Coordinates: 41.455°N 73.986°W

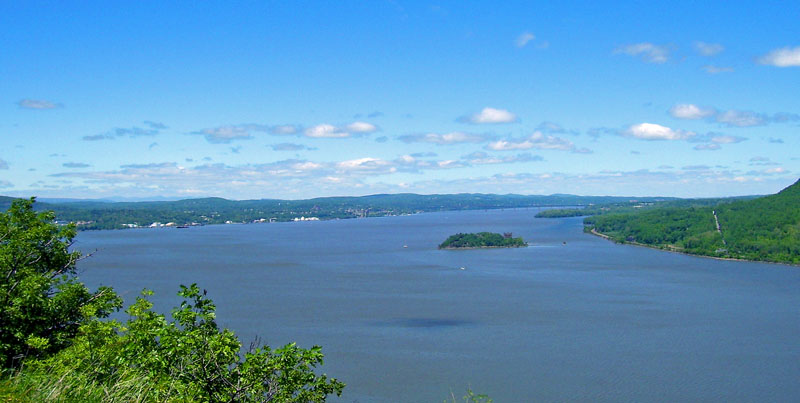
Newburgh Bay from Storm King Mountain. Bannerman's Island is in the front. New Windsor, the city of Newburgh and the bridge are visible, with the Shawangunks and Catskill peaks around Slide Mountain in the distance.

Newburgh Bay is a feature of the Hudson River's west bank, located approximately 60 miles (105 km) north of New York City. It takes its name from the city of Newburgh, New York, for many years the major port on this section of the river. Towns on the bay are Newburgh, New York; New Windsor, New York and Cornwall, New York, all in Orange County. The Roseton and Danskammer power plants are located at the north end of the bay, in the town of Newburgh.

The bay is not a protected inlet, but rather a widening of the river with a maximum depth of 80 feet (20 m). It begins roughly at the Hudson Highlands near the village of Cornwall-on-Hudson, New York, and extends some 10 miles north to Danskammer Point. Between the city of Newburgh, Orange County on the west bank and Beacon, Dutchess County on the east, the river is almost 2 miles (3.2 km) in width.

While not as wide as Haverstraw Bay to the south, the bay makes the river wide enough that it was the last section of the Hudson to be bridged. The Newburgh–Beacon Bridge opened in November 1963. The recently restored Newburgh–Beacon Ferry makes passenger-only trips between the two cities during commuting hours in the morning and evening for riders on the Metro North Hudson Line's Beacon station.
