= Pollution of the Hudson River =

Ongoing environmental disaster in the US

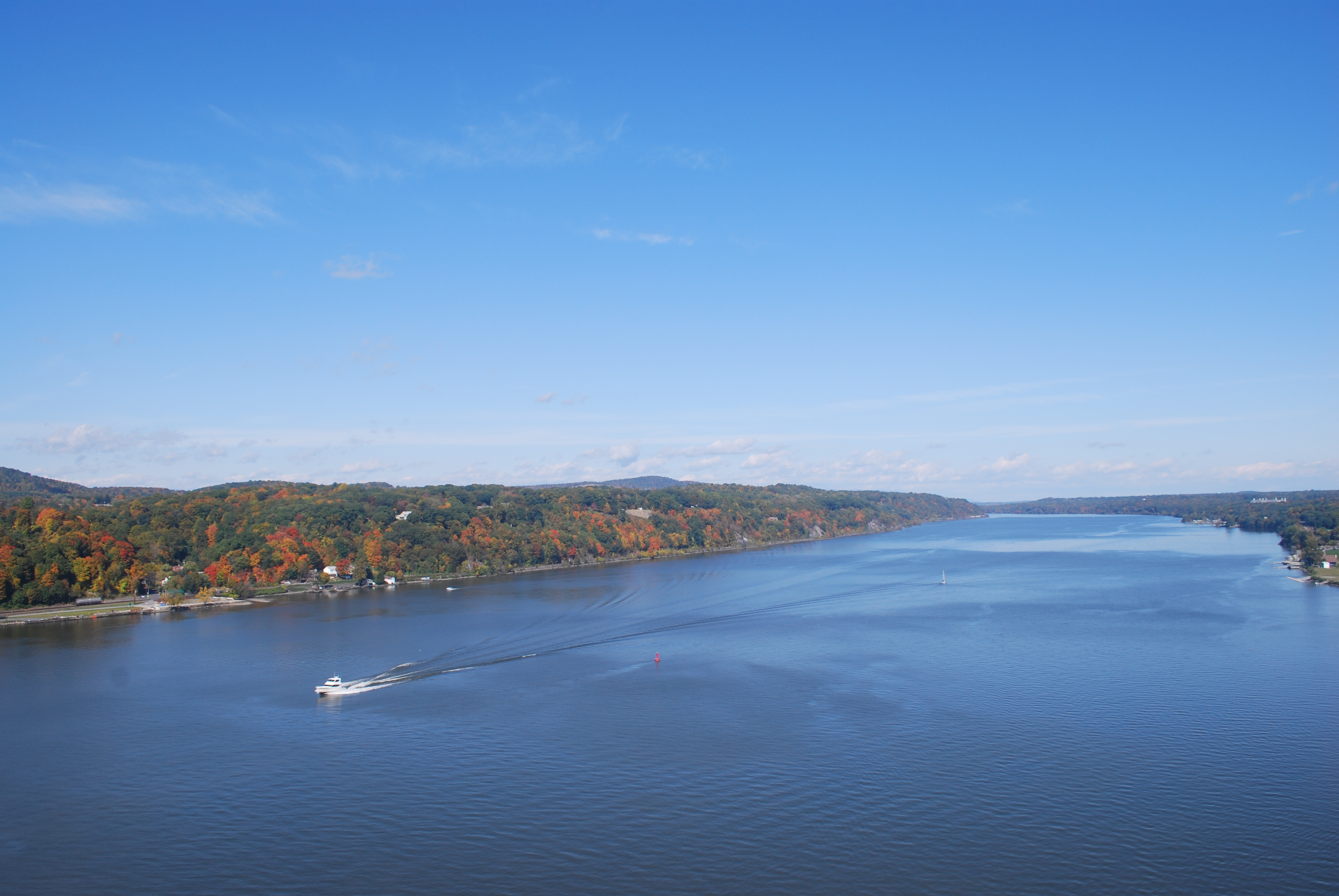
The Hudson River from the Poughkeepsie Bridge

Like many large rivers that course through urban centers, the Hudson River is subject to extensive pollution. Contributors include large chemical plants, agricultural sources, as well as domestic discharges. A particular problem arises from the discharge of polychlorinated biphenyls from General Electric facilities. Other kinds of pollution include mercury and untreated sewage. The New York State Department of Environmental Conservation (NYSDEC) has listed various portions of the Hudson as having impaired water quality due to PCBs, cadmium, and other toxic compounds. Other ongoing pollution problems affecting the river include: accidental sewage discharges, urban runoff, heavy metals, furans, dioxins, pesticides, and polycyclic aromatic hydrocarbons (PAHs).

== Geographic scope ==
In addition to the main stem of the Hudson River, tributaries with impaired water quality (not necessarily the same pollutants as the main stem) are Mohawk River, Dwaas Kill, Schuyler Creek, Saw Mill River, Esopus Creek, Hoosic River, Quaker Creek, and Batten Kill. Many lakes in the Hudson drainage basin are also listed as impaired.

== Types of pollution ==
=== PCBs ===
Numerous chemical factories that once lined the Hudson River produced PCBs as dielectric and coolant fluids for transformers, capacitors, and electric motors. Between approximately 1947 and 1977, General Electric (GE) released 1,300,000 pounds (590,000 kg) of PCBs into the river. The PCBs came from the company's two capacitor manufacturing plants at Hudson Falls and Fort Edward, New York. The bulk of the PCBs in the river were manufactured by Monsanto Co. under the brand names Aroclor 1242 and Aroclor 1016. This pollution was not comprehensively assessed until the 1970s. By that time, the largest remaining factories in the area were owned by GE.

The U.S. Environmental Protection Agency (EPA) banned the manufacture of PCBs in 1979. EPA designated the contaminated portion of the river, 200 miles (320 km) long, as a Superfund site in 1984, and GE became primarily responsible for the PCB cleanup operations. The highest concentration of PCBs was found in the Thompson Island Pool.

=== Untreated sewage ===
After a power failure at the Westchester County Yonkers Joint Sewage Treatment Plant, 39 million gallons of partly treated sewage were discharged into the Hudson River on July 3, 2026. State and local officials attributed the spill to an 8% voltage reduction in the area that occurred a day prior due to increased power use, an assessment later corroborated by a spokesperson for Consolidated Edison, the electric power utility.

=== Other pollutants ===
==== Lead chromate ====
General Motors, which operated the North Tarrytown Assembly in North Tarrytown, New York, released lead chromate and other painting, cleaning, and soldering chemicals into the river. Domestic waste would be processed through the village's sewage treatment plant. Around 1971, the village's Sewer and Water Superintendent assured that the pollution reports were exaggerated, and that he and other residents would swim by a beach nearby, however Dominick Pirone, an ecologist and former director of the Hudson River Fishermen's Association (now Riverkeeper) was quoted as saying: "You can tell what color cars they are painting on a given day by what color the river is."

==== Microorganics ====
The Hudson carries many "micro-organics", which means pharmaceuticals and pesticides. Prominent in the Hudson are gabapentin, metolachlor, and sucralose.

==== Zebrafish mussels ====
In 1991, zebra mussels, an invasive species, first appeared in the Hudson River, causing the near-disappearance of native pearly mussels.

== Effects ==
=== Fish ===
In 1976 NYSDEC banned all fishing in the Upper Hudson because of health concerns with PCBs. It also issued advisories restricting the consumption of fish caught within a 20-mile (30 km) long segment of the Hudson River from Hudson Falls to Troy.

Fish advisories issued by the New York State Department of Health (DOH) remained in effect as of 2022. DOH recommends eating no fish caught from the South Glens Falls Dam to the Federal Dam at Troy. Women over 50 and children under 15 are not advised to eat any fish caught south of the Palmer Falls Dam in Corinth, while others are advised to eat anywhere from one to four meals per month of Hudson River fish, depending on species and location caught. The Department of Health cites mercury, PCBs, dioxin, and cadmium as the chemicals impacting fish in these areas. In 2026, the state government relaxed its restrictions on fish caught south of Rip Van Winkle Bridge to the river's mouth at the Battery, allowing children and pregnant women to eat limited numbers of fish caught in these areas. Fish caught between the Rip Van Winkle Bridge and the Federal Dam remained unsafe to eat because PCB levels remained high.

=== PCBs ===
PCBs are thought to be responsible for health concerns that include neurological disorders, lower IQ and poor short-term memory (active memory), hormonal disruption, suppressed immune system, cancer, skin irritations, Parkinson's disease, ADHD, heart disease, and diabetes. PCB contamination in humans may come from drinking the contaminated water, absorption through the skin, eating contaminated aquatic life, and/or inhaling volatilized PCBs. PCB contamination is especially dangerous for pregnant and nursing women. The contamination can reach the fetus and potentially cause birth defects. Contamination through breast milk can also have harmful effects on the child indirectly.

== Cleanup ==
Extensive remediation actions on the river began in the 1970s with the implementation of wastewater discharge permits and consequent reduction of wastewater discharges, and sediment removal operations, which have continued into the 21st century.

In 1972 Congress passed the Clean Water Act and established a nationwide discharge permit system for all surface waters. All Hudson River point source dischargers were required to obtain permits issued by NYSDEC. The restrictions in these permits led to an overall reduction in pollutant loadings to the river, as factories, power plants and municipalities installed or improved their wastewater treatment systems or made other plant modifications to reduce pollution. Among the prominent sewage plant upgrades was the completion of the North River Wastewater Treatment Plant in Manhattan, where 150 million US gallons (0.57×10^{6} kl) per day of untreated sewage was discharged to the river until the plant opened in 1986. However, persistent pollutants such as PCBs and heavy metals, that had been discharged prior to implementation of the new permit requirements, remained in the sediments of the river.

=== Sediment dredging ===
One of the most dramatic and controversial steps in remediation of the Hudson has focused on the physical removal of the contaminated sludges. In addition to being expensive, dredging can induce resuspension of PCBs.

Among the initial attempts to clean up the upper Hudson River was the removal in 1977–78 of 180,000 cubic yards (140,000 m^{3}) of contaminated river sediments near Fort Edward. This hazardous waste site is considered to be one of the largest in the nation. In 1991, further PCB pollution was found at Bakers Falls, near the former GE Hudson Falls factory, and a program of remediation was started. In August 1995, a 40-mile (64 km) reach of the upper Hudson was reopened to fishing, but only on a catch-and-release basis. Removal of contaminated soil from Rogers Island was completed in December 1999.

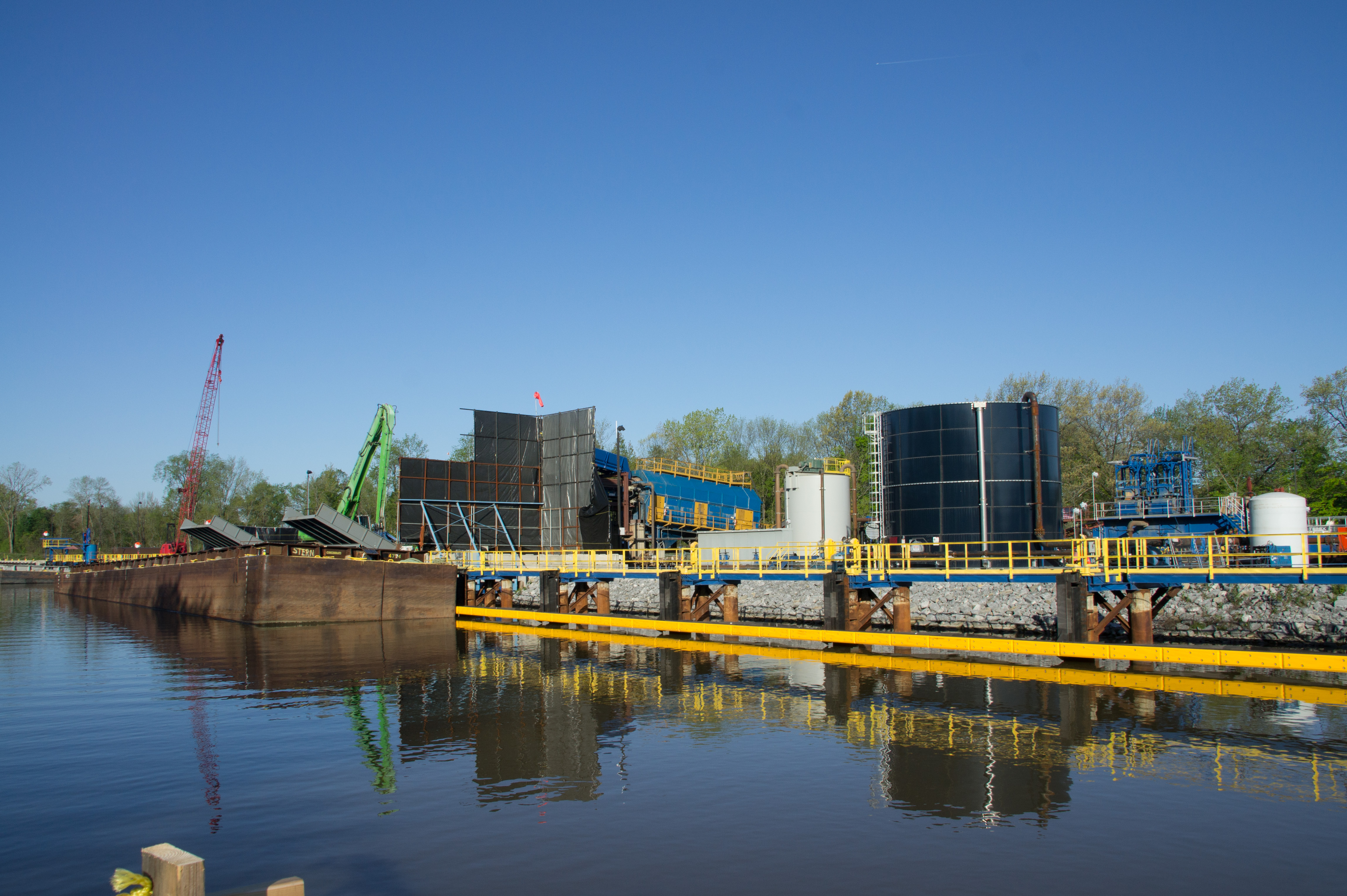
GE dredging operation in 2012

In 2001, after a ten-year study of PCB contamination in the river, EPA proposed a plan to clean up the river by dredging more than 100,000 pounds (45,000 kg) of PCBs. The worst PCB locations were targeted for remediation by removing and disposing of more than 2,600,000 cubic yards (2,000,000 m^{3}) of contaminated sediment. The dredging project was the most aggressive environmental effort ever proposed to clean up a river. In discussion about the EPA plan, and in advertising to local residents, GE had commented that dredging the river would actually stir up PCBs. The company eventually agreed to the cleanup plan and in 2002 EPA ordered GE to clean up a 40-mile (64 km) stretch of the river. EPA also announced that an additional 2,650,000 cubic yards (2,030,000 m^{3}) of contaminated sediments in the upper Hudson would be removed.

GE began sediment dredging operations to clean up the PCBs in 2009. In this stage of the cleanup ("Phase One") approximately 283,000 cubic yards (216,000 m^{3}) of contaminated sediment was removed. Over 620 barges filled with sediment were transported to a processing facility on the Champlain Canal, and over 80 rail cars transported the dredged sediment to a waste facility in Andrews, Texas. The scope of Phase One was about 100,000 cubic yards (76,000 m^{3}) more than planned, and Phase Two was to be expanded as a consequence. In 2010, the company agreed to finance and conduct a second dredging campaign on the upper Hudson between Fort Edward and Troy. These works have been supervised by EPA. Phase Two of the cleanup project, led by GE and monitored by EPA, was completed in 2015 and removed approximately 2,500,000 cubic yards (1,900,000 m^{3}) of PCB-contaminated sediment from the 40-mile section of the upper Hudson. Following completion of the dredging operations, aquatic plants were installed and habitat restoration commenced. As of 2025, GE stated that the dredging operations have cost $1.7 billion.

Additional activities following the dredging operations will continue for years, including water quality monitoring, sediment sampling, fish monitoring, habitat monitoring, and facility maintenance.

=== Activism ===
Although the cleanup has been slow, environmental advocacy groups have reached out to the general public on the condition of the river's pollution. Scenic Hudson, Hudson River Sloop Clearwater, Hudson Riverkeeper, and the Natural Resources Defense Council have continued to push for more action from General Electric. After Pete Seeger's death in 2014, EPA Regional Administrator Judith A. Enck praised the "incredible work" of Seeger and the Clearwater organization.

The actions of local citizen organizations led to the creation of Riverkeeper, a non-profit environmental organization that grew into a global umbrella organization, the Waterkeeper Alliance. The Hudson River Sloop Clearwater is another environmental education organization dedicated to the health of the Hudson River.

== Water quality improvement ==
A 2020 report on the health of the Hudson River states that "Water quality in the Hudson River Estuary has improved dramatically since 1972 and has remained largely stable in recent years." Ecological health trends, such as in tributaries and wetlands, are varied in condition.

=== Mercury ===
A 2008 study suggested that mercury in common Hudson River fish, including striped bass, yellow perch, largemouth bass, smallmouth bass and carp, declined strongly over the preceding three decades. The conclusions were extracted from a large database of mercury analyses of fish fillets accumulated by NYSDEC and collected over much of the length of the Hudson, from New York City waters to the Adirondack watershed. Trends were in line with the recovery that the Hudson River experienced over the preceding few decades, in response to the efforts of activist groups, government officials and industry by cooperating to help clean up the river system.

=== Closure of power plants ===
In 1980, Consolidated Edison agreed to drop its 17-year fight to build a pumped-storage hydroelectricity facility on Storm King Mountain, after a legal challenge by the non-profit environmental organization Scenic Hudson.

The Indian Point nuclear plant, which had been very destructive to aquatic life, permanently ceased operations on April 30, 2021.
