= Federal Dam =

Federal Dam may refer to a location in the United States:

- Federal Dam (Troy) on the Hudson River at Troy, New York
- Federal Dam, Minnesota, a small city
