= Hudson River Islands State Park =

State park in Greene and Columbia counties, New York

- Location within New York
- Type: State park
- Location: Hudson River; Coxsackie, New York
- Nearest city: Coxsackie, New York
- Coordinates: 42°19′08″N 73°46′48″W
- Area: 235 acres (0.95 km^{2})
- Operator: New York State Office of Parks, Recreation and Historic Preservation
- Visitors: 7,012 (in 2009)
- Open: May through October
- Website: Hudson River Islands State Park

Hudson River Islands State Park is a 235-acre (0.95 km^{2}) state park in New York. The park is located on the Hudson River in Greene and Columbia counties.

== Park description ==
Hudson River Islands State Park comprises the entirety of the island of Stockport Middle Ground and the southern tip of Gay's Point. The park is open from May through October, and is accessible only by boat.

The park offers access for fishing, hiking, and hunting, and includes a day-use area with picnic pavilions and a nature trail. Camping is permitted at several first-come, first-served primitive campsites.

The park is within the boundaries of the Stockport Flats section of the Hudson River National Estuarine Research Reserve, part of the National Estuarine Research Reserve System.

== See also ==
- List of New York state parks
