= Ord Falls =

- Location within New York Adirondack Park Location within the United States
- Location: SE of Newcomb
- Coordinates: 43°56′36″N 74°08′39″W
- Elevation: 1,555 ft (474 m)
- Watercourse: Hudson River

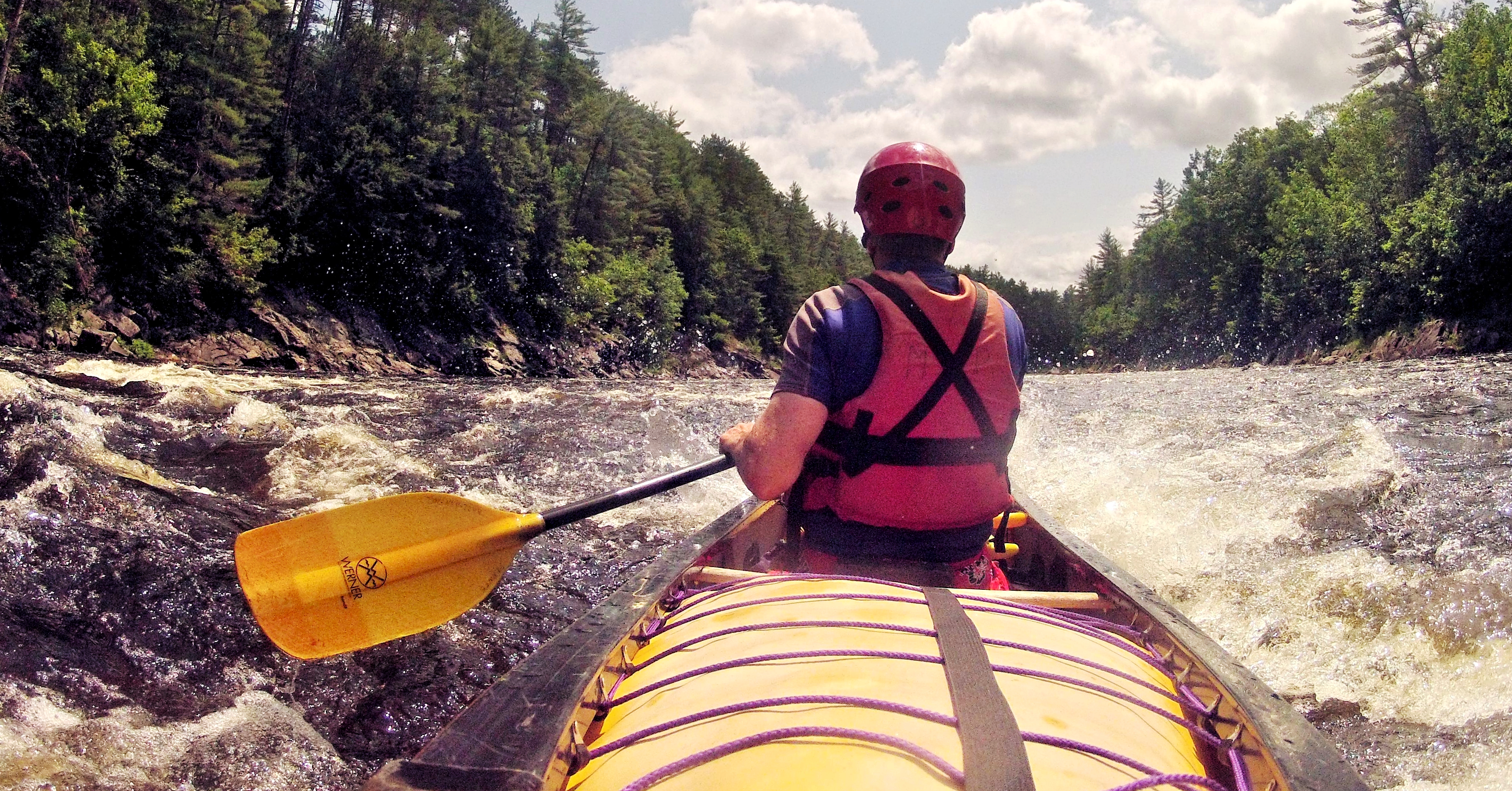
A canoeist on Ord Falls.

Ord Falls is a set of rapids, usually class 2, on the Hudson River in Essex County, New York (GPS 43.943477, -74.144390). It is located southeast of the Hamlet of Newcomb. Ord Falls and the surrounding river corridor can be run by canoes and kayaks when the U.S. Geological Survey gage at Newcomb registers three feet or higher.
