= Hudson River =

River in New York and New Jersey, US

Hudson River Ka’nón:no (Mohawk) Mahicannittuk (Mahican) Muhheakantuck / Mahicannitukw (Munsee)
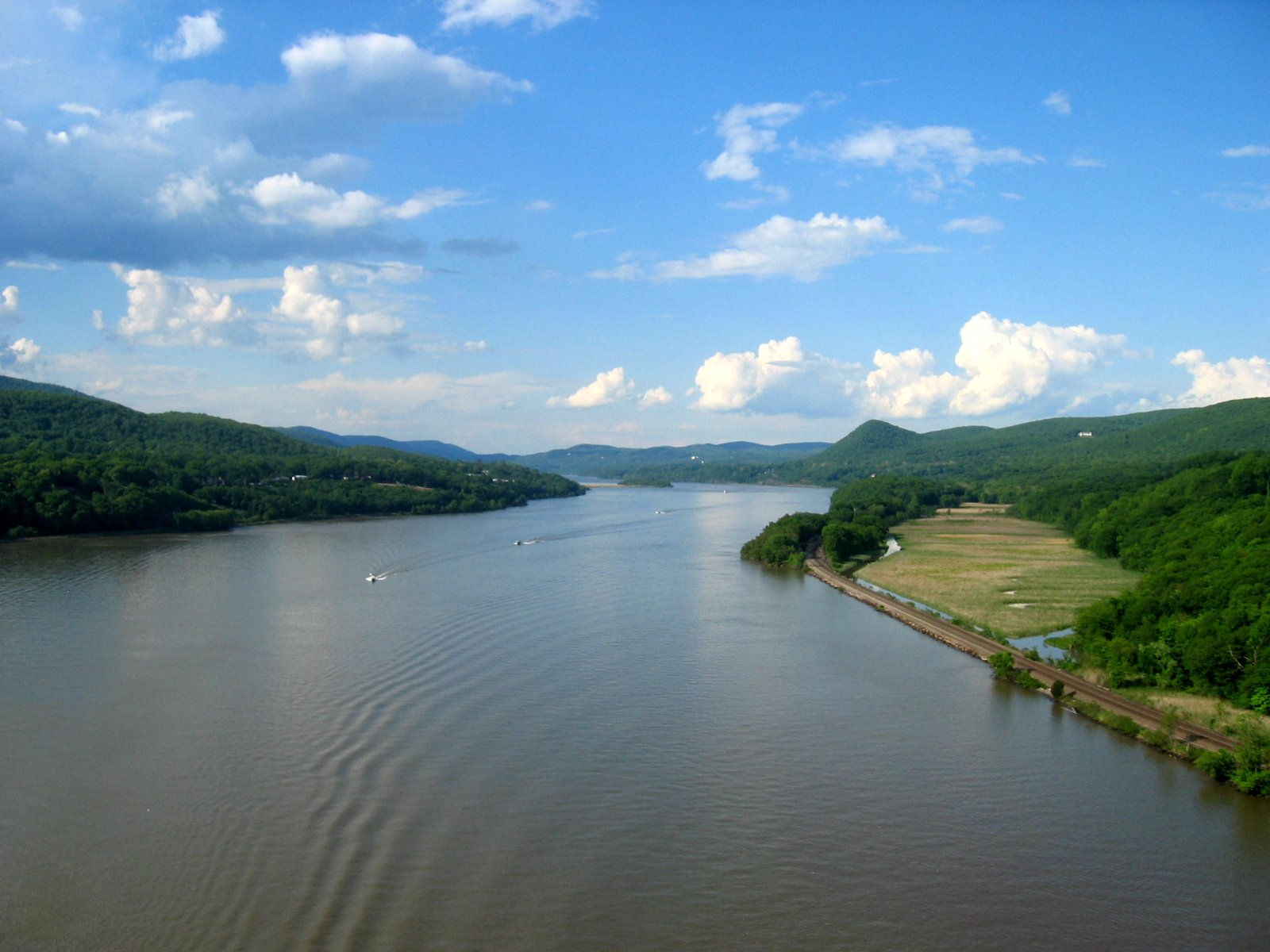
- The Hudson River as seen from Bear Mountain Bridge in New York state

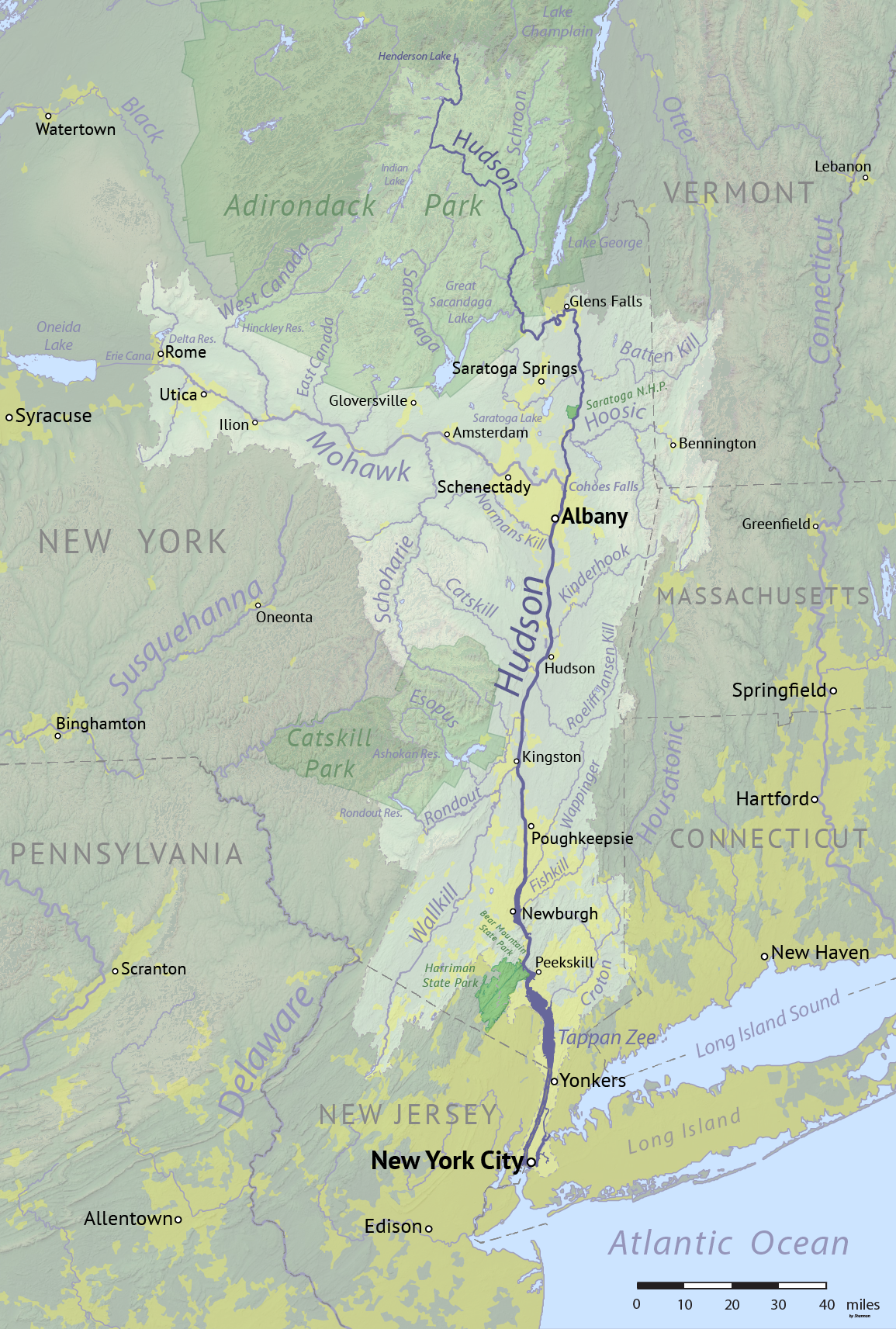
- The Hudson River Watershed, including the Hudson and Mohawk rivers

Location
- Country: United States
- State: New York, New Jersey
- City: See Populated places on the Hudson River

Physical characteristics
- Source: Lake Tear of the Clouds (see Sources)
  - location: Adirondack Mountains, New York, United States
  - coordinates: 44°05′29″N 74°03′33.0″W
  - elevation: 1,770 ft (540 m)
- Mouth: Atlantic Ocean, New York Harbor
  - location: Jersey City, New Jersey and Lower Manhattan, New York, United States
  - coordinates: 40°41′48″N 74°01′42″W
  - elevation: 0 ft (0 m)
- Length: 315 mi (507 km)
- Basin size: 14,000 mi^{2} (36,000 km^{2})
- Depth
  - average: 30 ft (9.1 m) (extent south of Troy)
  - maximum: 202 ft (62 m)
- Discharge
  - location: Lower New York Bay
  - average: 21,900 cu ft/s (620 m^{3}/s)
- Discharge
  - location: Green Island
  - average: 17,400 cu ft/s (490 m^{3}/s)
  - minimum: 882 cu ft/s (25.0 m^{3}/s)
  - maximum: 215,000 cu ft/s (6,100 m^{3}/s)

Basin features
- Tributaries
  - left: Boreas River, Schroon River, Batten Kill, Hoosic River, Kinderhook Creek, Roeliff Jansen Kill, Wappinger Creek, Croton River, Sing Sing Kill, Fishkill
  - right: Cedar River, Indian River, Sacandaga River, Mohawk River, Normans Kill, Catskill Creek, Esopus Creek, Rondout Creek, Wallkill River
- Waterfalls: Ord Falls, Spier Falls, Glens Falls, Bakers Falls

The Hudson River is a 315-mile (507 km) river that flows from north to south largely through eastern New York state. It originates in the Adirondack Mountains at Henderson Lake in the town of Newcomb, and flows south to New York Bay, a tidal estuary between New York City and Jersey City, before draining into the Atlantic Ocean. The river marks out the border between the U.S. states of New York and New Jersey and many upstate New York county borders. The lower half of the river is a tidal estuary, deeper than the body of water into which it flows, occupying the Hudson Fjord, an inlet that was carved out by North American glaciers. Even as far north as the city of Troy, the flow of the river changes direction with the tides.

The Hudson River runs through the Munsee (Lenape), Mohican, and Mohawk (Haudenosaunee) homelands. Prior to European exploration, the river was known as the Mahicannittuk by the Mohicans, Ka'nón:no by the Mohawks, and Muhheakantuck by the Lenape. European settlers subsequently named the river after Henry Hudson, an Englishman sailing for the Dutch East India Company who explored it in 1609, and after whom Hudson Bay in Canada is also named. It had previously been observed by Italian explorer Giovanni da Verrazzano sailing for King Francis I of France in 1524, as he became the first European known to have entered the Upper New York Bay, but he considered the river to be an estuary. The Dutch called the river the North River, and they called the present-day Delaware River the South River, which formed the spine of the Dutch colony of New Netherland. Settlements of the colony clustered around the Hudson, and its strategic importance as the gateway to the American interior led to years of competition between the English and the Dutch over control of the river and colony.

In the eighteenth century, the river valley and its inhabitants were the subject and inspiration of Washington Irving, the first internationally acclaimed American author. In the nineteenth century, the area inspired the Hudson River School of landscape painting, an American pastoral style, as well as the concepts of environmentalism and wilderness. The Delaware and Hudson Canal connected Port Jervis on the Delaware river to Kingston on the Hudson, creating an inland route for coal from Pennsylvania to New York that bypassed the dangerous coastal route. The Erie Canal, completed in 1825, connected Albany on the Hudson to Buffalo on Lake Erie and therefore New York to the Great Lakes, becoming an important route for western settlers.

Industrial contamination of the Hudson River grew sharply in the mid-twentieth century, particularly from polychlorinated biphenyls, or PCBs. Pollution control regulations, enforcement actions, and restoration projects initiated in the late twentieth and twenty-first centuries have begun to improve water quality. Sturgeon have been seen in the Hudson in the early twenty-first century.

== Names ==
The river was called Ka’nón:no or Ca-ho-ha-ta-te-a ("the river") by the Haudenosaunee, and it was known as Muh-he-kun-ne-tuk ("river that flows two ways" or "waters that are never still") or Mahicannittuk by the Mohican nation who formerly inhabited both banks of the lower portion of the river. The meaning of the Mohican name comes from the river's long tidal range. The Delaware Tribe of Indians (Bartlesville, Oklahoma) considers the closely related Mohicans to be a part of the Lenape people, and so the Lenape also claim the Hudson as part of their ancestral territory, also calling it Muhheakantuck.

The first known European name for the river was the Rio San Antonio as named by the Portuguese explorer in Spain's employ, Estêvão Gomes, who explored the Mid-Atlantic coast in 1525. Another early name for the Hudson used by the Dutch was Rio de Montaigne. Later, they generally termed it the Noortrivier, or "North River", the Delaware River being known as the Zuidrivier, or "South River". Other occasional names for the Hudson included Manhattes rieviere "Manhattan River", Groote Rivier "Great River", and de grootte Mouritse reviere, or "the Great Maurits River" (after Maurice, Prince of Orange).

The translated name North River was used in the New York metropolitan area up until the early 1900s, with limited use continuing into the present day. The term persists in radio communication among commercial shipping traffic, especially below the Tappan Zee. The term also continues to be used in names of facilities in the river's southern portion, such as the North River piers, North River Tunnels, and the North River Wastewater Treatment Plant. It is believed that the first use of the name Hudson River in a map was in a map created by the cartographer John Carwitham in 1740.

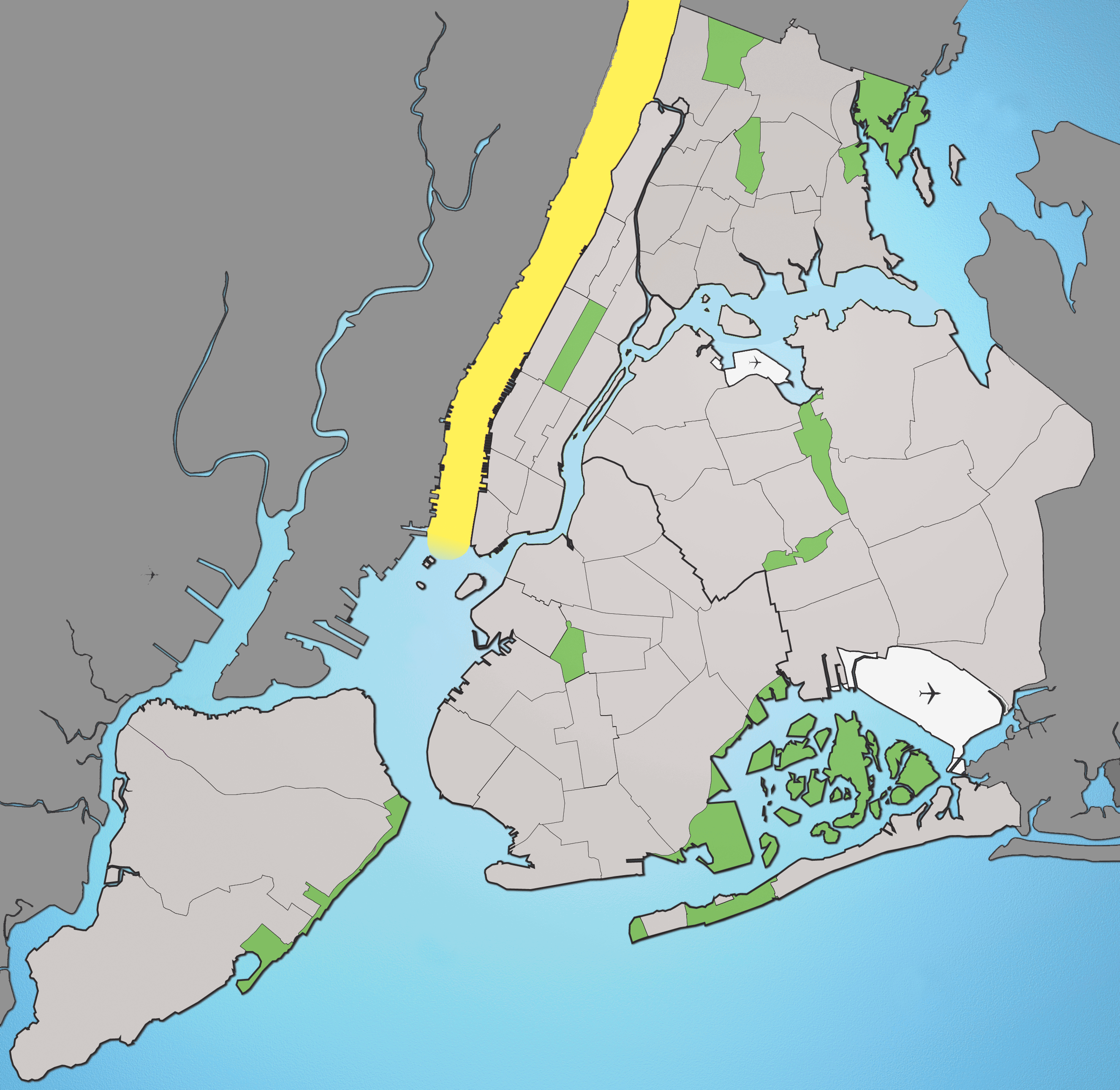
The New York City section of the Hudson river highlighted in yellow. The mouth of the Hudson at center is located between Jersey City and Manhattan.

In 1939, the magazine Life described the river as "America's Rhine", comparing it to the 760-mile (1,220 km) Rhine in Central and Western Europe.

The tidal Hudson is unusually straight for a river, and the earliest colonial Dutch charts of the Hudson River designated the narrow, meandering stretches as racks, or reaches. These names included the four "lower reaches" through the Hudson Highlands (Seylmakers rack, Cocks rack, Hoogh rack, and Vosserack) plus the four "upper reaches" from Inbocht Bay to Kinderhook (Backers rack, Jan Pleysiers rack, Klevers rack, and Harts rack). A ninth reach was described as "the long reach" by the Englishman Robert Juet and designated as the Langerack by the Dutch. An embellished (and partly erroneous) list of "The Old Reaches" was published in a tourist guidebook for steamboat passengers in the nineteenth century.

== Course ==
=== Sources ===
The source of the Hudson River is Henderson Lake, located in the Adirondack Mountains at an elevation of 553 m (1,814 ft). However, the photogenic Lake Tear of the Clouds is more conventionally cited in popular culture as the source of the Hudson. The river is named Feldspar Brook from where it emerges from Lake Tear of the Clouds until its confluence with the Opalescent River, after which it becomes the Opalescent until it reaches Calamity Brook flowing southward into the eastern outlet of Henderson Lake. After this point, the stream is known as the Hudson River according to the cartographical definition used by the United States Geological Survey (USGS).

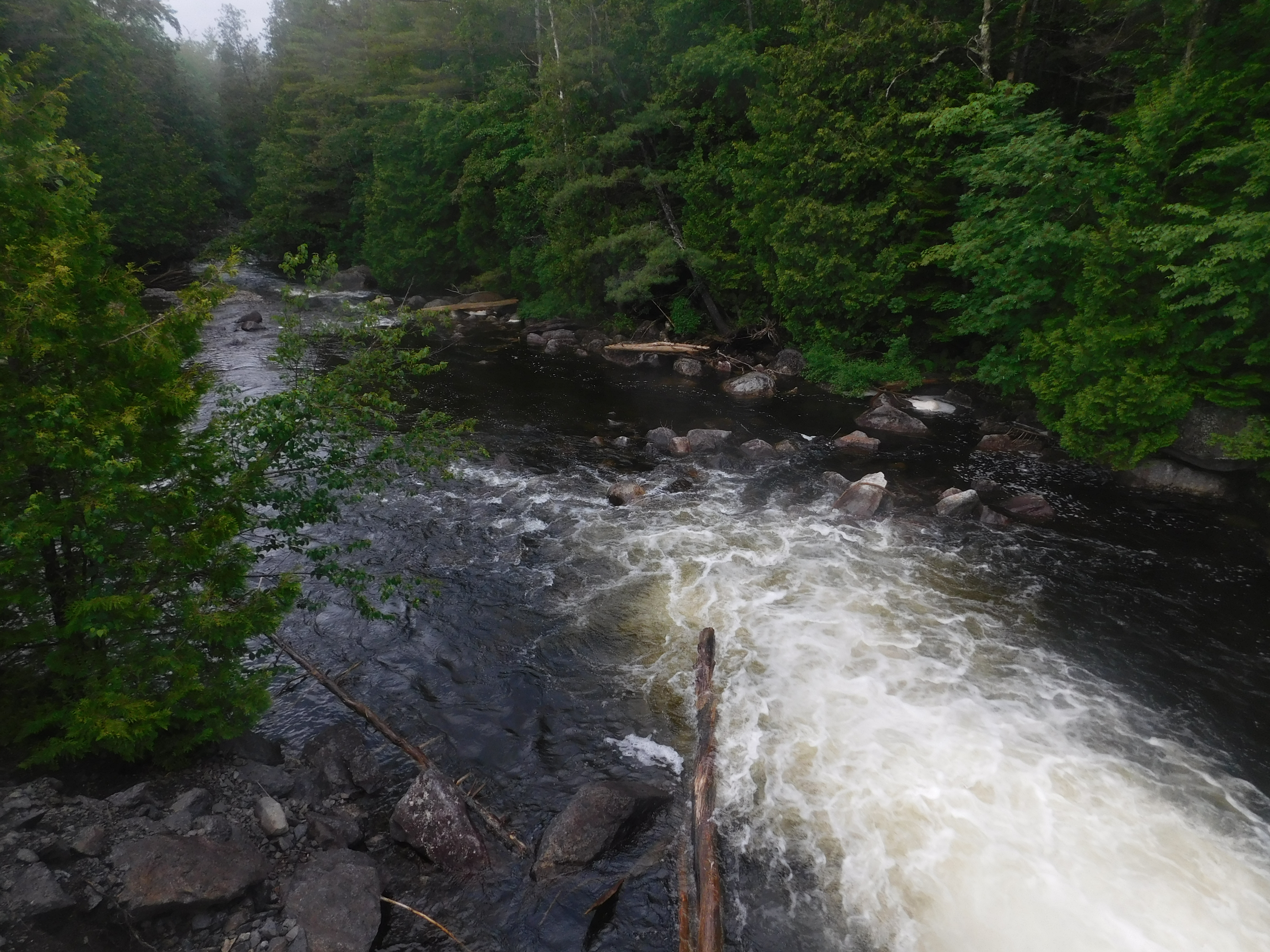
The Hudson River flowing out of Henderson Lake in Tahawus

USGS maps show the longest source of the Hudson as the Opalescent on the western slopes of Little Marcy Mountain, originating two miles north of Lake Tear of the Clouds.

=== Upper Hudson River ===
Using river names as seen on maps, Indian Pass Brook flows into Henderson Lake. The outlet of Henderson Lake is most commonly referred to as the official start of the Hudson River, as it flows east and meets the southwest flowing Calamity Brook. The confluence of the two rivers, however, is where most maps begin to use the Hudson River name on a cartographical basis. South of the outlet of Sanford Lake, the Opalescent River flows into the Hudson.

The Hudson then flows south, taking in Beaver Brook and the outlet of Lake Harris. After its confluence with the Indian River, the Hudson forms the boundary between Essex and Hamilton counties. The Hudson flows entirely into Warren County in the hamlet of North River, and takes in the Schroon River at Warrensburg. Further south, the river forms the boundary between Warren and Saratoga Counties. The river then takes in the Sacandaga River from the Great Sacandaga Lake.

Shortly thereafter, the river leaves the Adirondack Park, flows under Interstate 87, and through Glens Falls, just south of Lake George although receiving no streamflow from the lake. It next goes through Hudson Falls. At this point the river forms the boundary between Washington and Saratoga Counties. Here the river has an elevation of 200 feet (61 m). Just south in Fort Edward, the river reaches its confluence with the Champlain Canal, which historically provided boat traffic between New York City and Montreal and the rest of Eastern Canada via the Hudson, Lake Champlain and the Saint Lawrence Seaway.

Further south the Hudson takes in water from the Batten Kill River and Fish Creek near Schuylerville. The river then forms the boundary between Saratoga and Rensselaer counties. The river then enters the heart of the Capital District. It takes in water from the Hoosic River, which extends into Massachusetts. Shortly thereafter the river has its confluence with the Mohawk River, the largest tributary of the Hudson River, in Waterford. The river then reaches the Federal Dam in Troy, marking an impoundment of the river. At an elevation of 2 feet (0.61 m), the bottom of the dam marks the beginning of the tidal influence in the Hudson as well as the beginning of the lower Hudson River.

=== Lower Hudson River ===
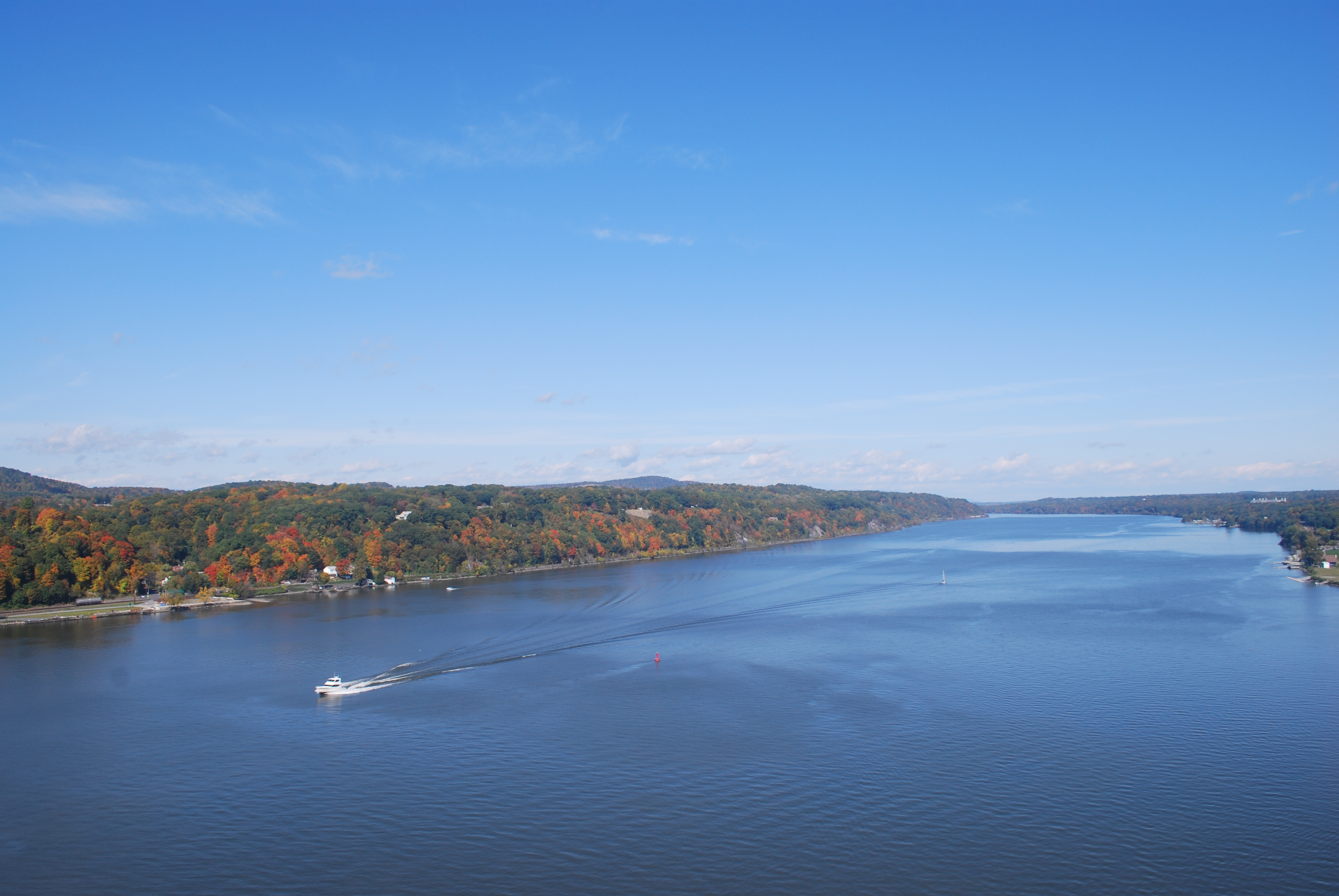
The river from Poughkeepsie, looking north

South of the Federal Dam, the Hudson River begins to widen considerably. The river enters the Hudson Valley, flowing between the cities of Albany on the west bank and Rensselaer on the east bank. Interstate 90 crosses the Hudson into Albany at this point in the river. The Hudson then leaves the Capital District, forming the boundary between Greene and Columbia Counties. It then meets its confluence with Schodack Creek, widening considerably at this point. After flowing by Hudson, the river forms the boundary between Ulster and Columbia Counties and Ulster and Dutchess Counties, passing Germantown and Kingston.

The Delaware and Hudson Canal met the river at Kingston. The river then flows by Hyde Park, former residence of Franklin D. Roosevelt, and alongside the city of Poughkeepsie, flowing under the Walkway over the Hudson and the Mid-Hudson Bridge. Afterwards, the Hudson passes Wappingers Falls and takes in Wappinger Creek. The river then forms the boundary between Orange and Dutchess Counties. It flows between Newburgh and Beacon and under the Newburgh Beacon Bridge, taking in the Fishkill Creek.

In this area, between Gee's Point at the US Military Academy and Constitution Island, an area known as "World's End" marks the deepest part of the Hudson, at 202 feet (62 m). Shortly thereafter, the river enters the Hudson Highlands between Putnam and Orange Counties, flowing between mountains such as Storm King Mountain, Breakneck Ridge, and Bear Mountain. The river narrows considerably here before flowing under the Bear Mountain Bridge, which connects Westchester and Rockland Counties.

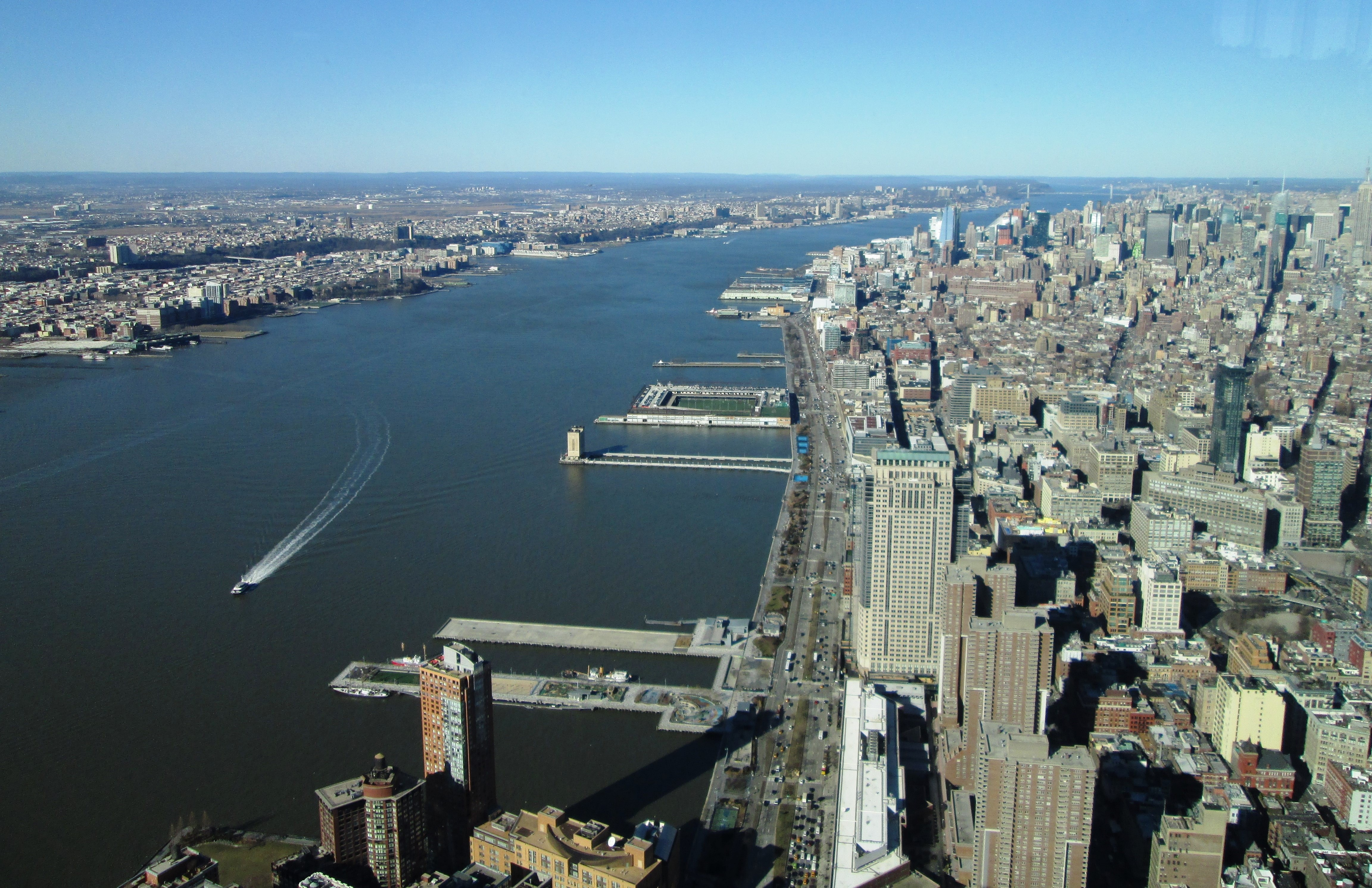
The river between Hudson Waterfront in New Jersey (left) and Manhattan (right)

Afterward, leaving the Hudson Highlands, the river enters Haverstraw Bay, the widest point of the river at 3.5 miles (5.6 km) wide. Shortly thereafter, the river forms the Tappan Zee and flows under the Tappan Zee Bridge, which carries the New York State Thruway between Tarrytown and Nyack in Westchester and Rockland Counties respectively. At the state line with New Jersey the west bank of the Hudson enters Bergen County. The Palisades are large, rocky cliffs along the west bank of the river; also known as Bergen Hill at their lower end in Hudson County.

Further south the east bank of the river becomes Yonkers and then the Riverdale neighborhood of the Bronx in New York City. South of the confluence of the Hudson and Spuyten Duyvil Creek (subsumed by the Harlem River Ship Canal connecting to the Harlem River), the east bank of the river becomes Manhattan. The river is sometimes still called the North River from this point south. The George Washington Bridge crosses the river between Fort Lee and the Washington Heights neighborhood of Manhattan.

The Lincoln Tunnel and the Holland Tunnel also cross under the river between Manhattan and New Jersey. South of the Battery, the river proper ends, meeting the East River to form Upper New York Bay, also known as New York Harbor. Its outflow continues through the Narrows between Brooklyn and Staten Island, under the Verrazzano Bridge, and into Lower New York Bay, Gravesend Bay, and the Atlantic Ocean through the Hudson Canyon.

== Geography and watershed ==
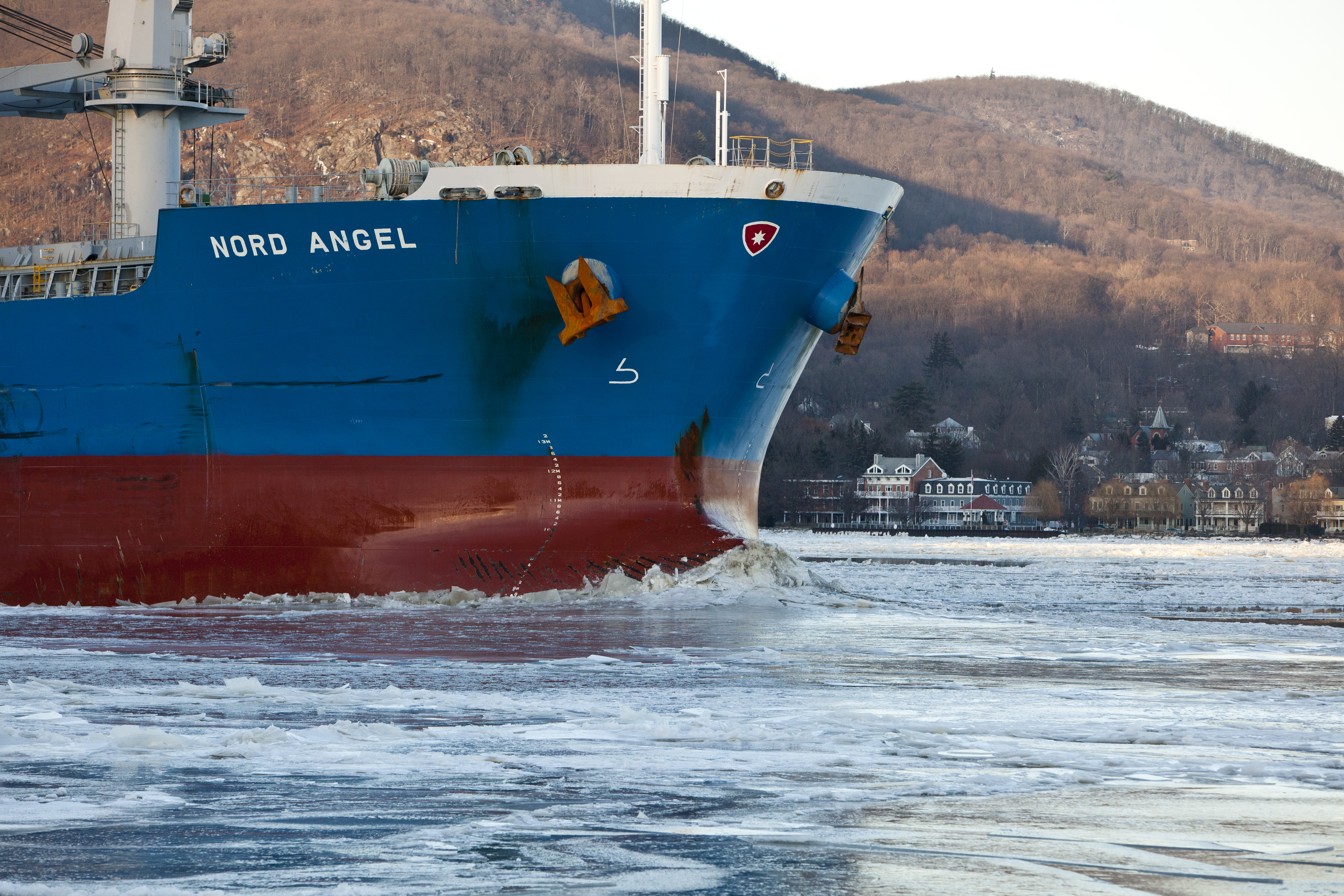
The bulk carrier Nord Angel breaking ice on the Hudson

The lower Hudson is a tidal estuary, with tidal influence extending as far as the Federal Dam in Troy. There are about two high tides and two low tides per day. As the tide rises, the tidal current moves northward, taking enough time that part of the river can be at high tide while another part can be at the bottom of its low tide.

Strong tides make parts of New York Harbor difficult and dangerous to navigate. During the winter, ice floes may drift south or north, depending upon the tides. The Mahican name of the river represents its partially estuarine nature: muh-he-kun-ne-tuk means "the river that flows both ways." Due to tidal influence from the ocean extending to Troy, NY, freshwater discharge is only about 17,400 cubic feet (490 m^{3}) per second on average. The mean fresh water discharge at the river's mouth in New York is approximately 21,900 cubic feet (620 m^{3}) per second.

The Hudson River is 315 miles (507 km) long, with depths of 30 feet (9.1 m) for the stretch south of the Federal Dam, dredged to maintain the river as a shipping route. Some sections there are around 160 feet deep, and the deepest part of the Hudson, known as "World's End" (between the US Military Academy and Constitution Island) has a depth of 202 feet (62 m).

The Hudson and its tributaries, notably the Mohawk River, drain an area of 13,000 square miles (34,000 km^{2}), the Hudson River Watershed. It covers much of New York, as well as parts of Connecticut, Massachusetts, New Jersey, and Vermont.

Parts of the Hudson River form coves, such as Weehawken Cove in the towns of Hoboken and Weehawken in New Jersey.

The City of Poughkeepsie and several adjacent communities in the mid-Hudson valley, totalling about 100,000 people, rely on the river for their drinking water.

=== Salinity ===
New York Harbor, between the Narrows and the George Washington Bridge, has a mix of fresh and ocean water, mixed by wind and tides to create an increasing gradient of salinity from the river's top to its bottom. This varies with season, weather, variation of water circulation, and other factors; snow melt at winter's end increases the freshwater flow downstream.

The salt line of the river varies from the north in Poughkeepsie to the south at Battery Park in New York City, though it usually lies near Newburgh.

=== Counties ===
The Hudson River passes through 17 counties in the state of New York and 2 in New Jersey.

Counties
Hamilton
Essex
Warren
Washington
Saratoga
Albany
Rensselaer
Greene
Columbia
Ulster
Dutchess
Putnam
Orange
Rockland
Westchester
Bronx
Bergen, NJ
Hudson, NJ
New York

== Geology ==
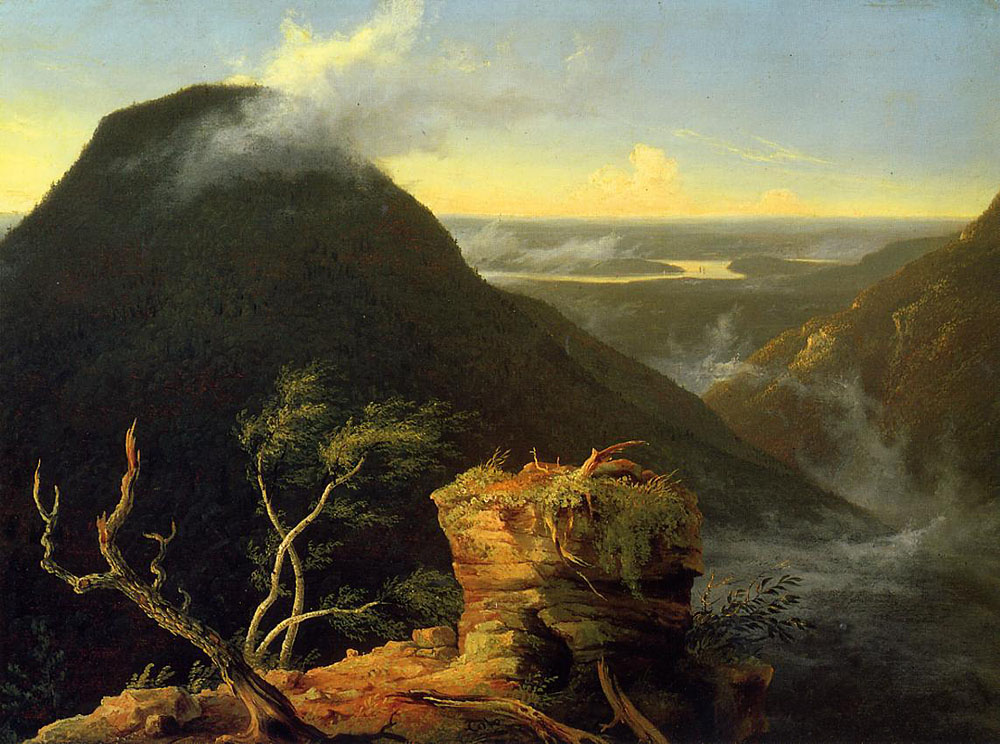
Thomas Cole, Sunny Morning on the Hudson River, 1827

The Hudson is sometimes called, in geological terms, a drowned river. The rising sea levels after the retreat of the Wisconsin glaciation, the most recent ice age, have resulted in a marine incursion that drowned the coastal plain and brought salt water well above the mouth of the river. The deeply eroded old riverbed beyond the current shoreline, Hudson Canyon, is a rich fishing area. The former riverbed is clearly delineated beneath the waters of the Atlantic Ocean, extending to the edge of the continental shelf. As a result of the glaciation and the rising sea levels, the lower half of the river is now a tidal estuary that occupies the Hudson Fjord.

Along the river, the Palisades are of metamorphic basalt, or diabases, the Highlands are primarily granite and gneiss with intrusions, and from Beacon to Albany, shales and limestones, or mainly sedimentary rock.

Suspended sediments, mainly consisting of clays eroded from glacial deposits and organic particles, can be found in abundance in the river. The Hudson has a relatively short history of erosion, so it does not have a large depositional plain near its mouth. This lack of significant deposits near the river mouth differs from most other American estuaries. Around New York Harbor, sediment also flows into the estuary from the ocean when the current is flowing north.

The modern Hudson River course has been heavily influenced by Pleistocene glaciation. Prior to Pleistocene glaciation, evidence suggests that the proto-Hudson River flowed through wind gaps in the Palisades Sill and the Watchung Mountains into central New Jersey. At this time, the Hudson was a tributary to an ancient river system in the Pensauken Plain, flowing southwest across New Jersey to a delta in what is now the Chesapeake Bay, Delaware Bay, and Delmarva Peninsula region. This river system was bounded by a now mostly eroded coastal plain upland to the east.

Fragments of Early Pleistocene glacial till overlying the Pensauken Formation in central New Jersey record the earliest continental glaciation in North America. This glaciation led to large-scale river network reorganization through erosion of the eastern coastal plain, opened the lower Hudson River Valley, and re-routed the Hudson River towards its current orientation. Much of the evidence from this process, as well as the impacts of intervening glaciations, have been erased or buried by the advance of the Laurentide ice sheet during Wisconsin glaciation (the Last Glacial Period in North America).

The Wisconsonian advance of the Laurentide buried the entire Hudson River Valley in ice, reaching its maximum extent around 25,000 years ago. At the Last Glacial Maximum (LGM), lasting from 25,000 to 24,000 years ago at the Hudson Lobe, sea levels were about 120 m (390 ft) lower than present day. The East Coast continental shelf was exposed, and the ice sheet was land-terminating. While at its maximum LGM extent, the Laurentide Ice Sheet deposited a massive terminal moraine. The moraine formed a continuous wall of glacial till across northeastern New Jersey, Staten Island, and Long Island, damming the Arthur Kill at Perth Amboy, New Jersey, and the Hudson River at The Narrows.

As the Laurentide retreated, large glacial lakes formed between the ice margin and the moraines. For over 10,000 years, the re-emerging Hudson River Valley was filled by an evolving glacial lake which varied in size and drainage at different stages, generally referred to as Lake Albany. As ice retreated, Lake Albany outflow drained across a bedrock spillway at Hell Gate, dropping 15 m (49 ft) into Lake Connecticut, which filled the modern Long Island Sound. Outflow through The Narrows began after large glacial outburst floods began to overtop and erode the moraine dam. The first of these floods came from Glacial Lake Wallkill, which filled the Wallkill Valley, and continued with flooding from lakes through the Catskills. The breaching of The Narrows was completed by flooding from Glacial Lake Iroquois, through the Iromohawk River (the proto-Mohawk River) at Quaker Springs, New York.

Drainage from the Great Lakes region through the Mohawk Valley continued until ice retreated beyond the Champlain Valley, allowing further outburst flooding from a northern route across a spillway at Covey Hill, Quebec. Further retreat merged Lake Albany with Lake Iroquois, creating Lake Vermont. Lake Vermont was the final stage of glacial lakes in the Hudson River valley, ending 13,000 years ago when ice retreat beyond the St. Lawrence River Valley opened drainage from Lake Vermont into the Champlain Sea. The Hudson River watershed shrank to its current extent, leaving the successors to Lake Vermont (Lake Ontario, Lake George, and Lake Champlain) to drain through the St. Lawrence River.

== History ==
=== Pre-Columbian era ===
The area around Hudson River was inhabited by indigenous peoples ages before Europeans arrived. The Lenape, Wappinger, and Mahican branches of the Algonquians lived along the river, mostly in peace with the other groups. The Algonquians in the region mainly lived in small clans and villages throughout the area. One major settlement was called Navish, which was located at Croton Point, overlooking the Hudson River. Other settlements were located in various locations throughout the Hudson Highlands. Many villagers lived in various types of houses, which the Algonquians called wigwams, though large families often lived in longhouses that could be a hundred feet long.

At the associated villages, they grew corn, beans, and squash. They also gathered other types of plant foods, such as hickory nuts and many other wild fruits and tubers. In addition to agriculture, the Algonquians also fished in the Hudson River, focusing on various species of freshwater fish, as well as various variations of striped bass, American eels, sturgeon, herring, and shad. Oyster beds were also common on the river floor, which provided an extra source of nutrition. Land hunting consisted of turkey, deer, bear, and other animals.

The lower Hudson River was inhabited by the Lenape, while further north, the Wappingers lived from Manhattan Island up to Poughkeepsie. They traded with both the Lenape to the south and the Mahicans to the north. The Mahicans lived in the northern part of the valley from present-day Kingston to Lake Champlain, with their capital located near present-day Albany.

=== Exploration and colonization ===
John Cabot is credited for the Old World's discovery of continental North America, with his journey in 1497 along the continent's coast. In 1524, Florentine explorer Giovanni da Verrazzano sailed north along the Atlantic seaboard and into New York Harbor. However, he left the harbor shortly thereafter, without navigating into the Hudson River. In 1598, Dutch men employed by the Greenland Company wintered in New York Bay.

In 1609 the Dutch East India Company financed English navigator Henry Hudson in his search for the Northeast Passage, but thwarted by sea ice in that direction, he sailed westward across the Atlantic in pursuit of a Northwest Passage. During the search, Hudson sailed up the river that would later be named after him. He then sailed upriver to a point near Stuyvesant (Old Kinderhook), and the ship's boat with five members ventured to the vicinity of present-day Albany, reaching an end to navigation.

The Dutch subsequently began to colonize the region, establishing the colony of New Netherland, including three major fur-trading outposts: New Amsterdam, Wiltwyck, and Fort Orange. New Amsterdam was founded at the mouth of the Hudson River, and would later become known as New York City. Wiltwyck was founded roughly halfway up the Hudson River, and would later become Kingston. Fort Orange was founded on the river north of Wiltwyck, and later became known as Albany.

The Dutch West India Company operated a monopoly on the region for roughly twenty years before other businessmen were allowed to set up their own ventures in the colony. In 1647, Director-General Peter Stuyvesant took over management of the colony, and surrendered it in 1664 to the British, who had invaded the largely-defenseless New Amsterdam. New Amsterdam and the colony of New Netherland were renamed New York, after the Duke of York.

Under British colonial rule, the Hudson Valley became an agricultural hub. Manors were developed on the east side of the river, and the west side contained many smaller and independent farms. In 1754, the Albany Plan of Union was created at Albany City Hall on the Hudson. The plan allowed the colonies to treaty with the Iroquois and provided a framework for the Continental Congress.

=== American Revolution ===
During the American Revolutionary War, the British realized that the river's proximity to Lake George and Lake Champlain would allow their navy to control the water route from Montreal to New York City. British general John Burgoyne planned the Saratoga campaign, to control the river and therefore cut off the patriot hub of New England (to the river's east) from the South and Mid-Atlantic regions to the river's west. The action would allow the British to focus on rallying the support of loyalists in the southerly states. As a result, numerous battles were fought along the river and in nearby waterways. These include the Battle of Long Island, in August 1776 and the Battle of Harlem Heights the following month. Later that year, the British and Continental Armies were involved in skirmishes and battles in rivertowns of the Hudson in Westchester County, culminating in the Battle of White Plains.

Also in late 1776, New England militias fortified the river's choke point known as the Hudson Highlands, which included building Fort Clinton and Fort Montgomery on either side of the Hudson and a metal chain between the two. In 1777, Washington expected the British would attempt to control the Hudson River, but they instead conquered Philadelphia, and left a smaller force in New York City, with permission to strike the Hudson Valley at any time. The British attacked on October 5, 1777, in the Battle of Forts Clinton and Montgomery by sailing up the Hudson River, looting the village of Peekskill and capturing the two forts. In 1778, the Continentals constructed the Great West Point Chain in order to prevent another British fleet from sailing up the Hudson.

=== Hudson River School ===
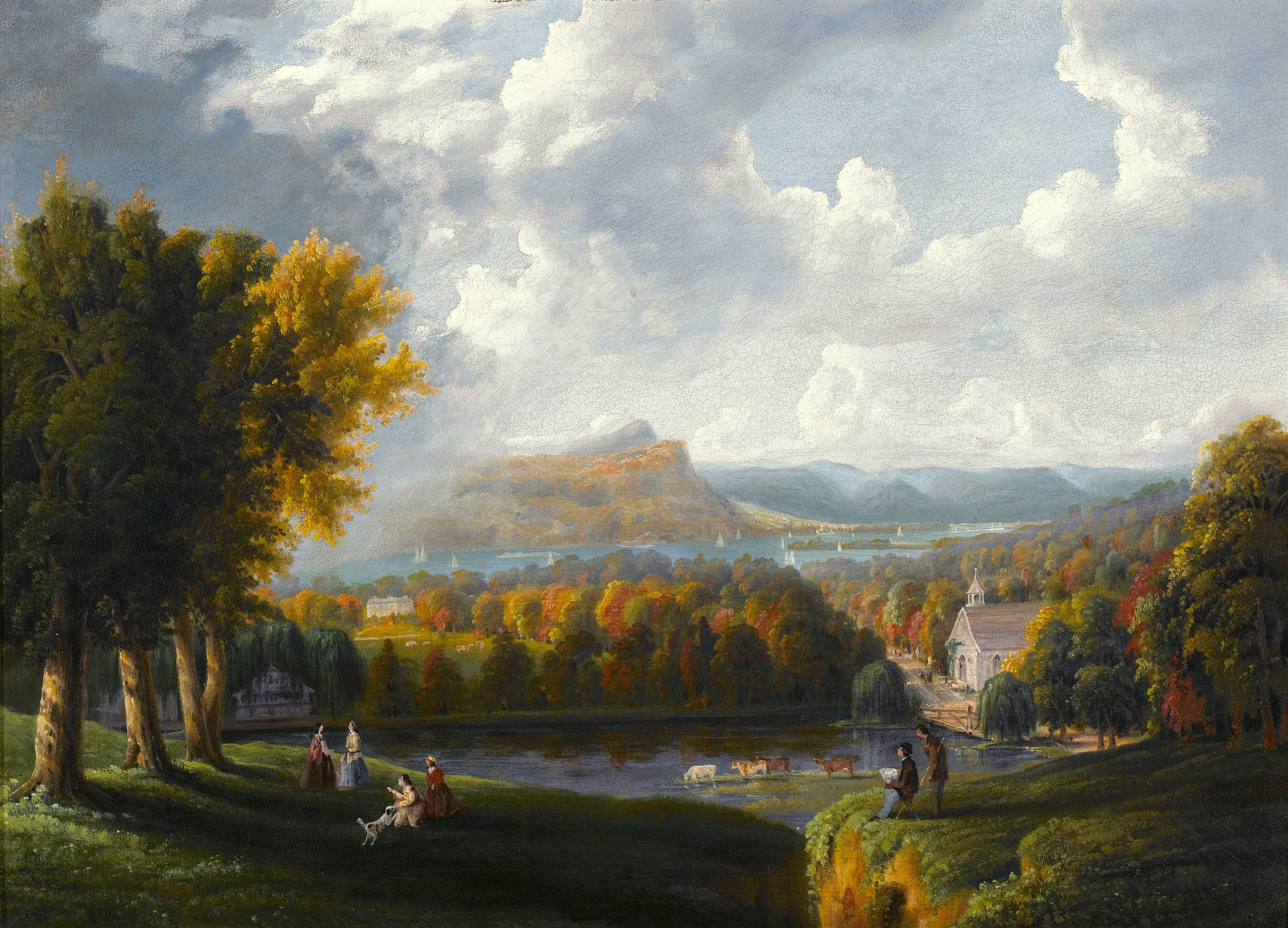
Robert Havell Jr., View of the Hudson River from Tarrytown, c. 1866

Hudson River School paintings reflect the themes of discovery, exploration, and settlement in America in the mid-19th century. The detailed and idealized paintings also typically depict a pastoral setting. The works often juxtapose peaceful agriculture and the remaining wilderness, which was fast disappearing from the Hudson Valley just as it was coming to be appreciated for its qualities of ruggedness and sublimity. The school characterizes the artistic body, its New York location, its landscape subject matter, and often its subject, the Hudson River.

In general, Hudson River School artists believed that nature in the form of the American landscape was an ineffable manifestation of God, though the artists varied in the depth of their religious conviction. Their reverence for America's natural beauty was shared with contemporary American writers such as Henry David Thoreau and Ralph Waldo Emerson. The artist Thomas Cole is generally acknowledged as the founder of the Hudson River School, his work first being reviewed in 1825, while painters Frederic Edwin Church and Albert Bierstadt were the most successful painters of the school.

=== 19th century ===
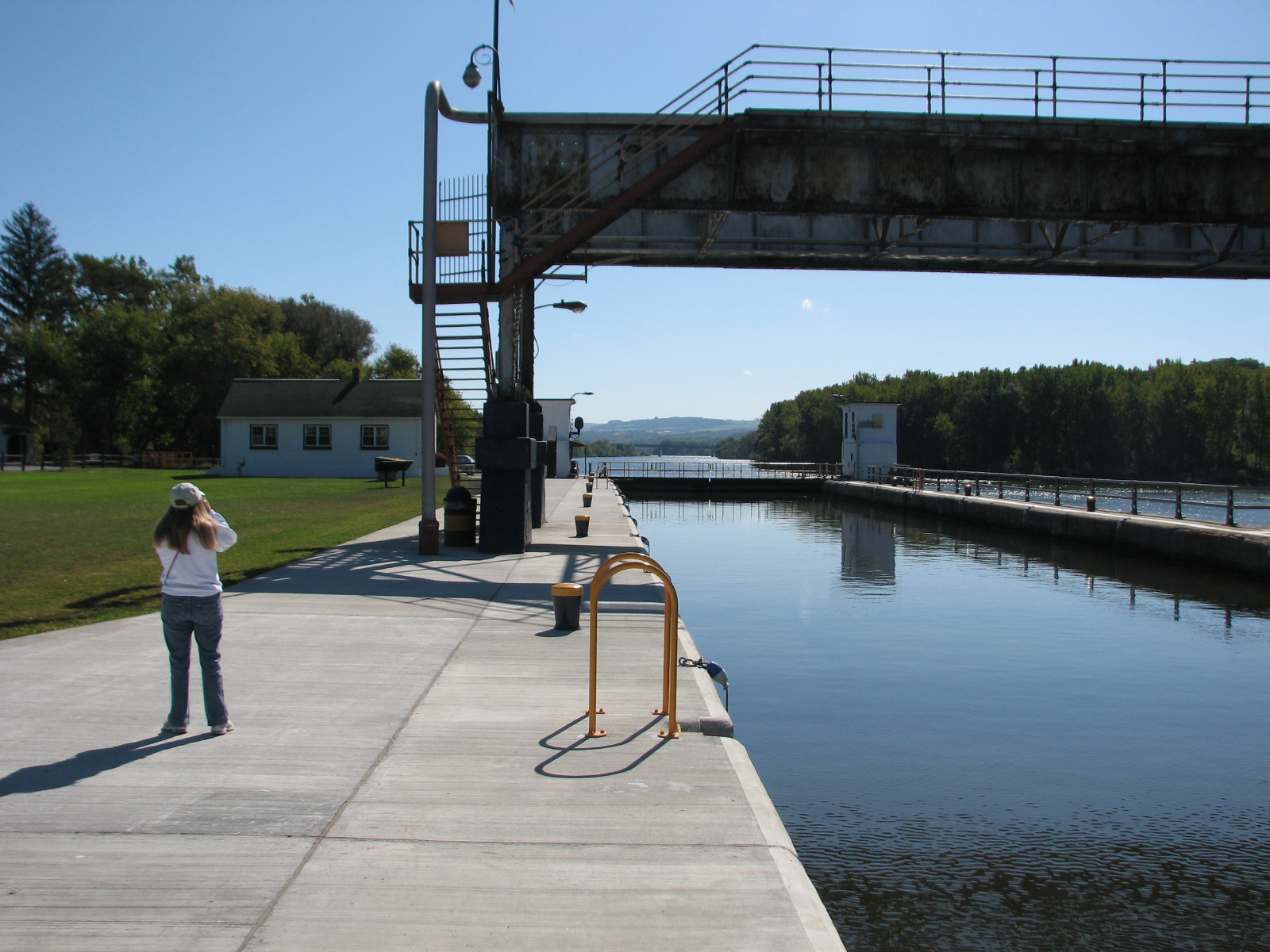
The Erie Canal in Amsterdam, New York

At the beginning of the 19th century, transportation from the US east coast into the mainland was difficult. Ships were the fastest vehicles at the time, as trains were still being developed and automobiles were roughly a century away. In order to facilitate shipping throughout the country's interior, numerous canals were constructed between internal bodies of water in the 1800s. One of the most significant canals of this era was the Erie Canal. The canal was built to link the Midwest to the Port of New York, a significant seaport during that time, by way of the Great Lakes, the canal, the Mohawk River, and the Hudson River.

The completion of the canal enhanced the development of the American West, allowing settlers to travel west, send goods to markets in frontier cities, and export goods via the Hudson River and New York City. The completion of the canal made New York City one of the most vital ports in the nation, surpassing the Port of Philadelphia and ports in Massachusetts. After the completion of the Erie Canal, smaller canals were built to connect it with the new system. The Champlain Canal was built to connect the Hudson River near Troy to the southern end of Lake Champlain. This canal allowed boaters to travel from the St. Lawrence Seaway, and then British cities such as Montreal to the Hudson River and New York City.

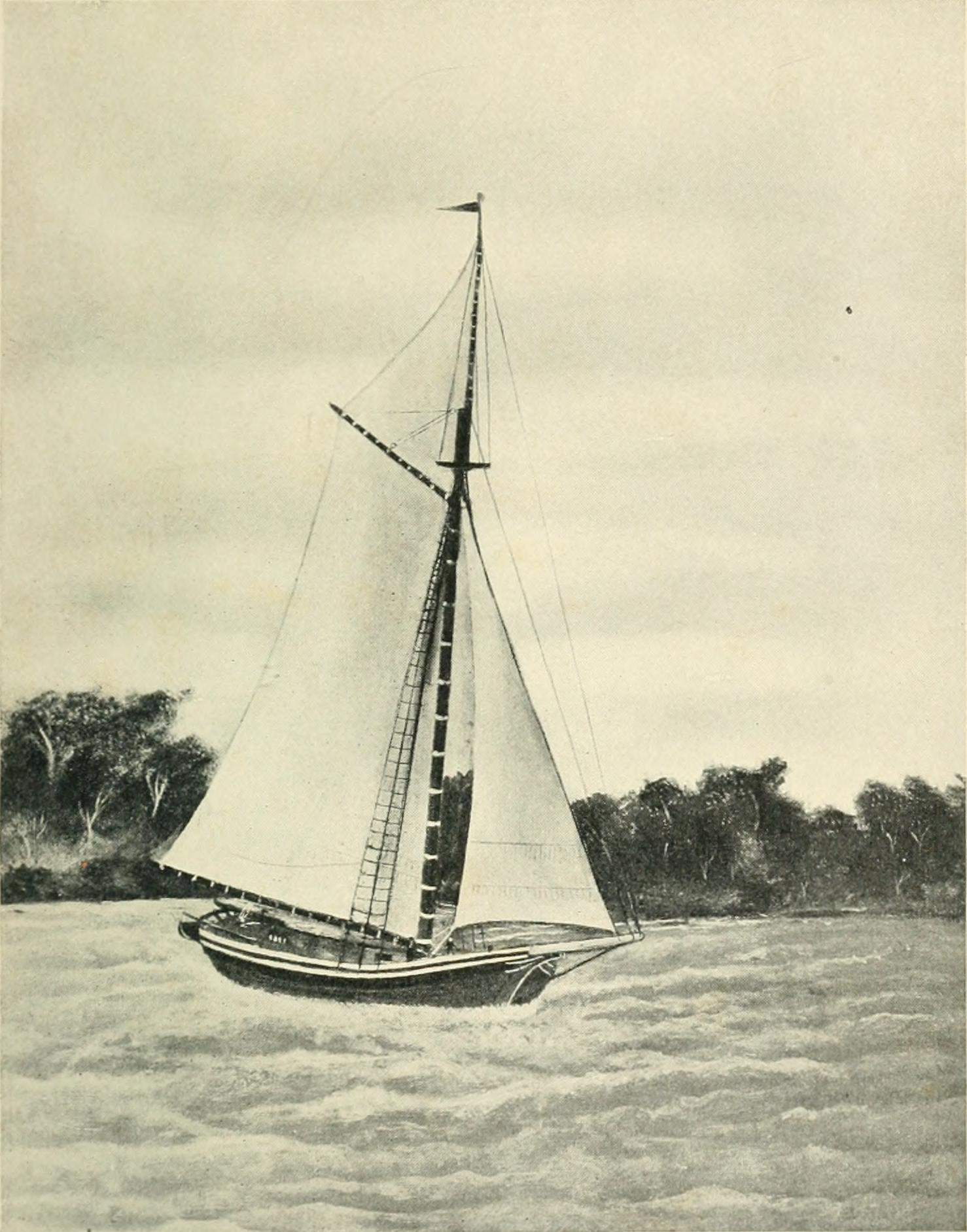
Hudson River sloop

Another major canal was the Oswego Canal, which connected the Erie Canal to Oswego and Lake Ontario, and could be used to bypass Niagara Falls. The Cayuga-Seneca Canal connected the Erie Canal to Cayuga Lake and Seneca Lake. Farther south, the Delaware and Hudson Canal was built between the Delaware River at Honesdale, Pennsylvania, and the Hudson River at Kingston, New York. This canal enabled the transportation of coal, and later other goods as well, between the Delaware and Hudson River watersheds. The combination of these canals made the Hudson River one of the most vital waterways for trade in the nation.

During the Industrial Revolution, the Hudson River became a major location for production, especially around Albany and Troy. The river allowed for fast and easy transport of goods from the interior of the Northeast to the coast. Hundreds of factories were built around the Hudson, in towns including Poughkeepise, Newburgh, Kingston, and Hudson. The North Tarrytown Assembly (later owned by General Motors), on the river in Sleepy Hollow, was a large and notable example. The River links to the Erie Canal and Great Lakes, allowing manufacturing in the Midwest, including automobiles in Detroit, to use the river for transport. With industrialization came new technologies for transport, including steamboats for faster transport. In 1807, the North River Steamboat (later known as Clermont), became the first commercially successful steamboat. It carried passengers between New York City and Albany along the Hudson River.

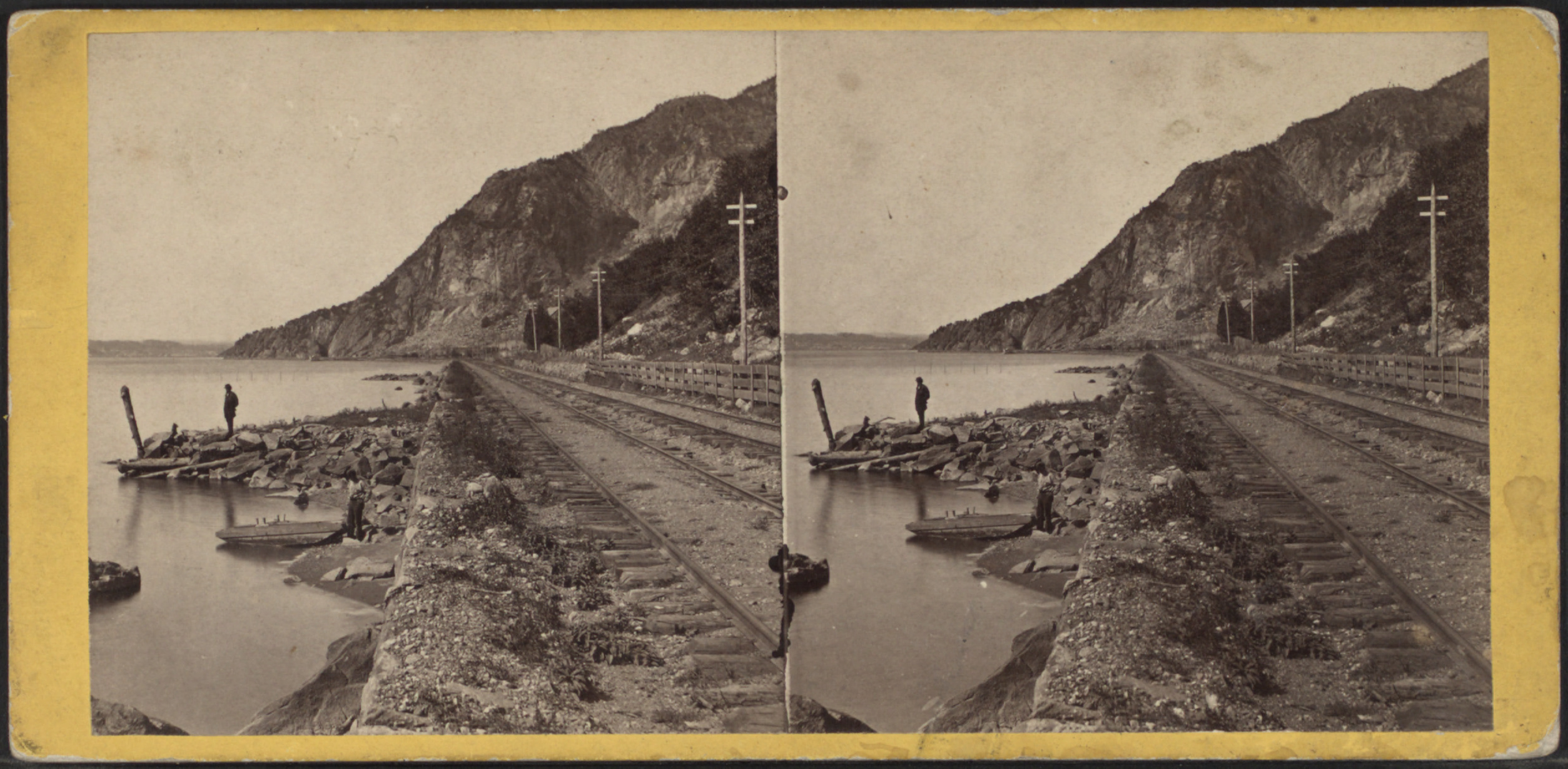
Stereoscopic views of the Hudson River Railroad and Hudson River

The Hudson River valley also proved to be a good area for railroads. The Hudson River Railroad was established in 1849 on the east side of the river as a way to bring passengers from New York City to Albany. The line was built as an alternative to the New York and Harlem Railroad for travel to Albany, and as a way to ease the concerns of cities along the river. The railroad was also used for commuting to New York City. Further north, the Livingston Avenue Bridge was opened in 1866 as a way to connect the Hudson River Railroad with the New York Central Railroad, which goes west to Buffalo. Smaller railroads existed north of this point. On the west side of the Hudson River, the West Shore Railroad opened to run passenger service from Weehawken, New Jersey to Albany, and then Buffalo. In 1889, the Poughkeepsie Railroad Bridge opened for rail service between Poughkeepsie and the west side of the river.

=== 20th and 21st centuries ===
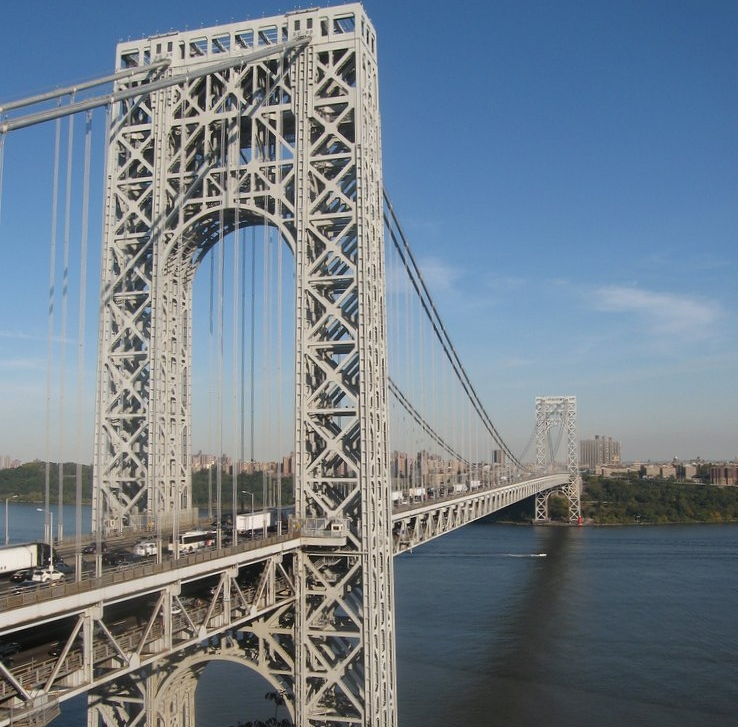
The George Washington Bridge links Upper Manhattan and Fort Lee, New Jersey.

Starting in the 20th century, the technological requirements needed to build large crossings across the river were met. This was especially important by New York City, as the river is fairly wide at that point. In 1927, the Holland Tunnel opened between New Jersey and Lower Manhattan. The tunnel was the longest underwater tunnel in the world at the time, and used an advanced system to ventilate the tunnels and prevent the build-up of carbon monoxide. The original upper level of the George Washington Bridge and the first tube of the Lincoln Tunnel followed in the 1930s. Both crossings were later expanded to accommodate extra traffic: the Lincoln Tunnel in the 1940s and 1950s, and the George Washington Bridge in the 1960s. In 1955, the original Tappan Zee Bridge was built over one of the widest parts of the river, from Tarrytown to Nyack.

The late 20th century saw a decline in industrial production in the Hudson Valley. In 1993, IBM closed two of its plants, in East Fishkill and Kingston, due to the company's loss of $16 billion over the previous three years. The plant in East Fishkill had 16,300 workers at its peak in 1984, and had opened in 1941 originally as part of the war effort. In 1996, the North Tarrytown plant of General Motors (GM) closed. In response to the plant closures, towns throughout the region sought to make the region attractive for technology companies. IBM maintained a mainframe unit at its Poughkeepsie plant, and newer housing and office developments were built near there as well. Commuting from Poughkeepsie to New York City also increased. Developers also looked to build on the property of the old GM plant.

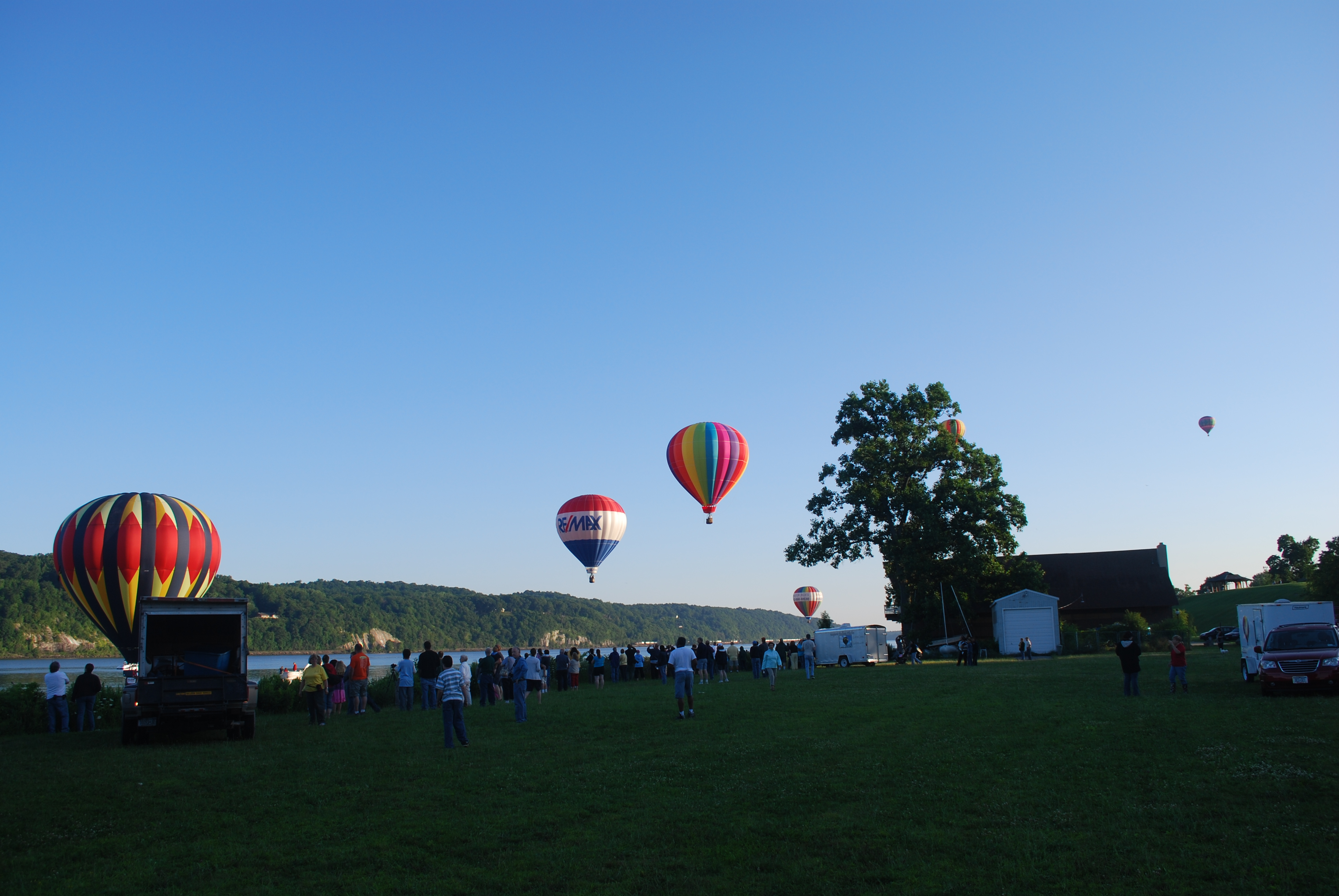
The Hudson Valley Hot-Air Balloon Festival, 2009

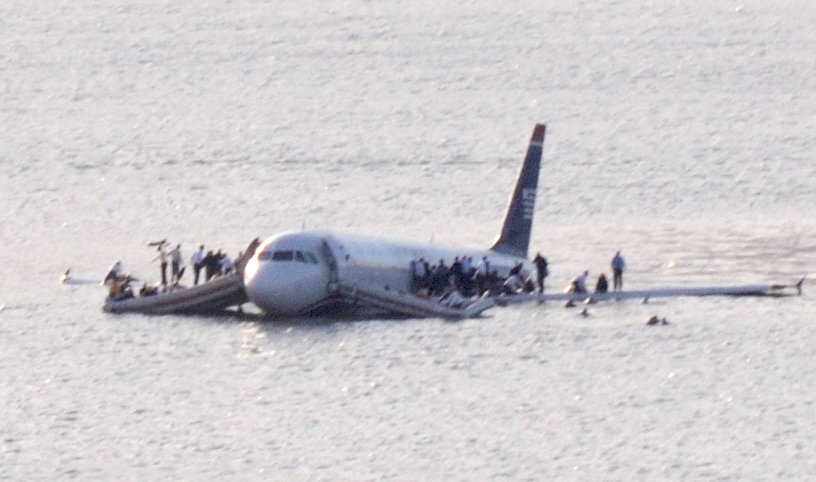
US Airways Flight 1549 after landing on the waters of the Hudson River in January 2009

Around the time of the last factories' closing, environmental efforts to clean up the river progressed. For example, the Environmental Protection Agency (EPA) ordered General Electric (GE), which had polluted a 200-mile stretch of the river, to remove PCBs from the site of its old factory in Hudson Falls, as well as to remove millions of cubic yards of contaminated sediment from the river bottom. EPA's cleanup order was issued pursuant to the agency's designation of the polluted segment of the river as a Superfund site. Other conservation efforts also occurred, such as when Christopher Swain became the first person to swim all 315 miles of the Hudson River in support of cleaning it up.

In conjunction with conservation efforts, the Hudson River region has seen an economic revitalization, especially in favor of green development. In 2009, the High Line was opened in the Chelsea neighborhood of Manhattan. This linear park has views of the river throughout its length. Also in 2009, the original Poughkeepsie railroad bridge, since abandoned, was converted into the Walkway Over the Hudson, a pedestrian park over the river. Emblematic of the increase in green development in the region, waterfront parks in cities like Kingston, Poughkeepsie, and Beacon were built, and several festivals are held annually.

== Landmarks ==
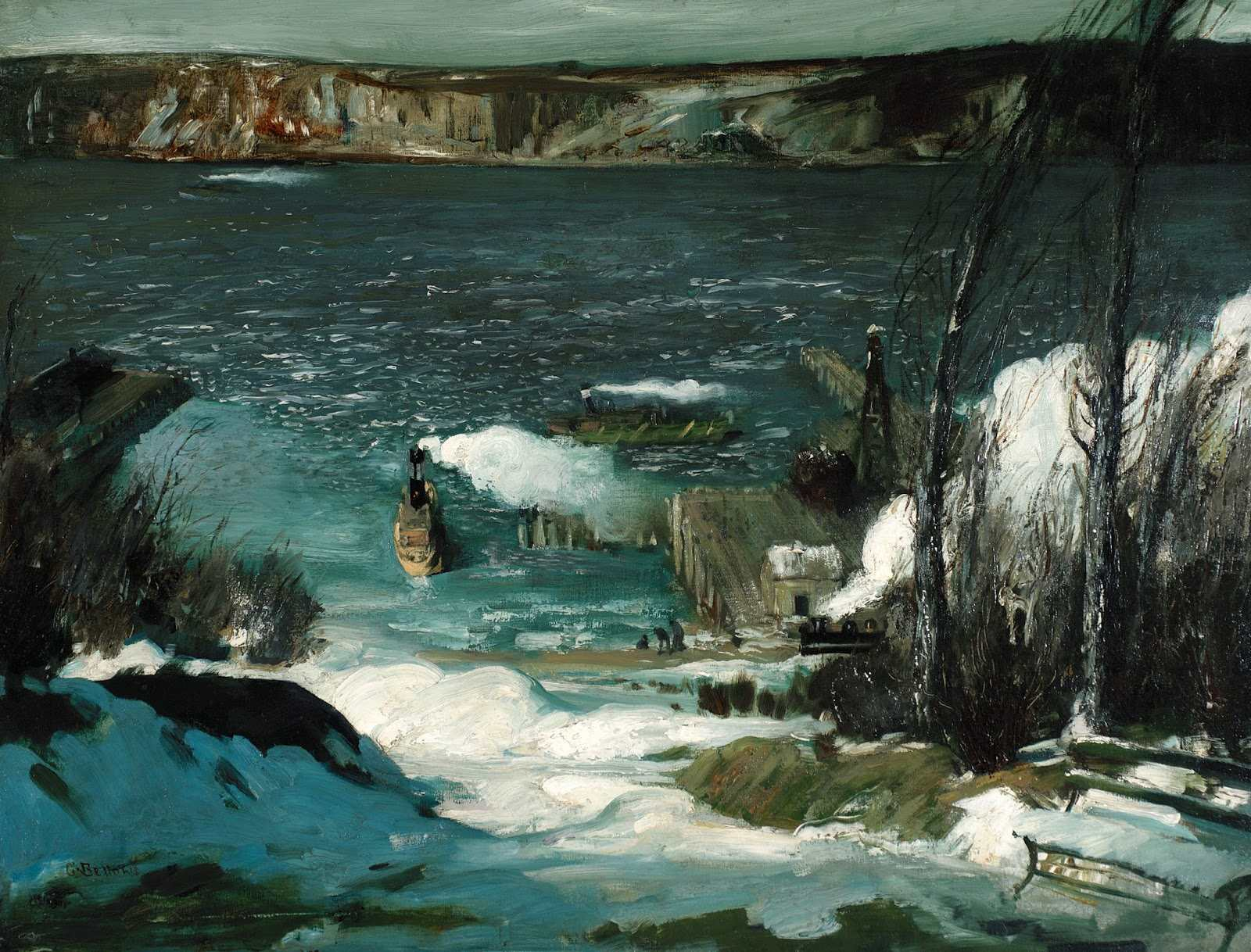
North River by George Bellows, 1908, Pennsylvania Academy of the Fine Arts

Numerous places have been constructed along the Hudson that have since become landmarks. Following the river from its source to mouth, there is the Hudson River Islands State Park in Greene and Columbia counties, and in Dutchess County, there is Bard College, Staatsburgh, the Vanderbilt Mansion National Historic Site, Franklin D. Roosevelt's home and presidential library, and the main campus of the Culinary Institute of America, Marist University, the Walkway over the Hudson, Bannerman's Castle, and Hudson Highlands State Park. South of that in Orange County is the United States Military Academy. In Westchester lies Indian Point Energy Center, Croton Point Park, and Sing Sing Correctional Facility.

In New Jersey are Stevens Institute of Technology and Liberty State Park. In Manhattan is Fort Tryon Park with the Cloisters, and the World Trade Center. Ellis Island, partially belonging to both the states of New Jersey and New York, is located just south of the river's mouth in New York Harbor. The Statue of Liberty, located on Liberty Island, is located a bit further south.

== Landmark status and protection ==
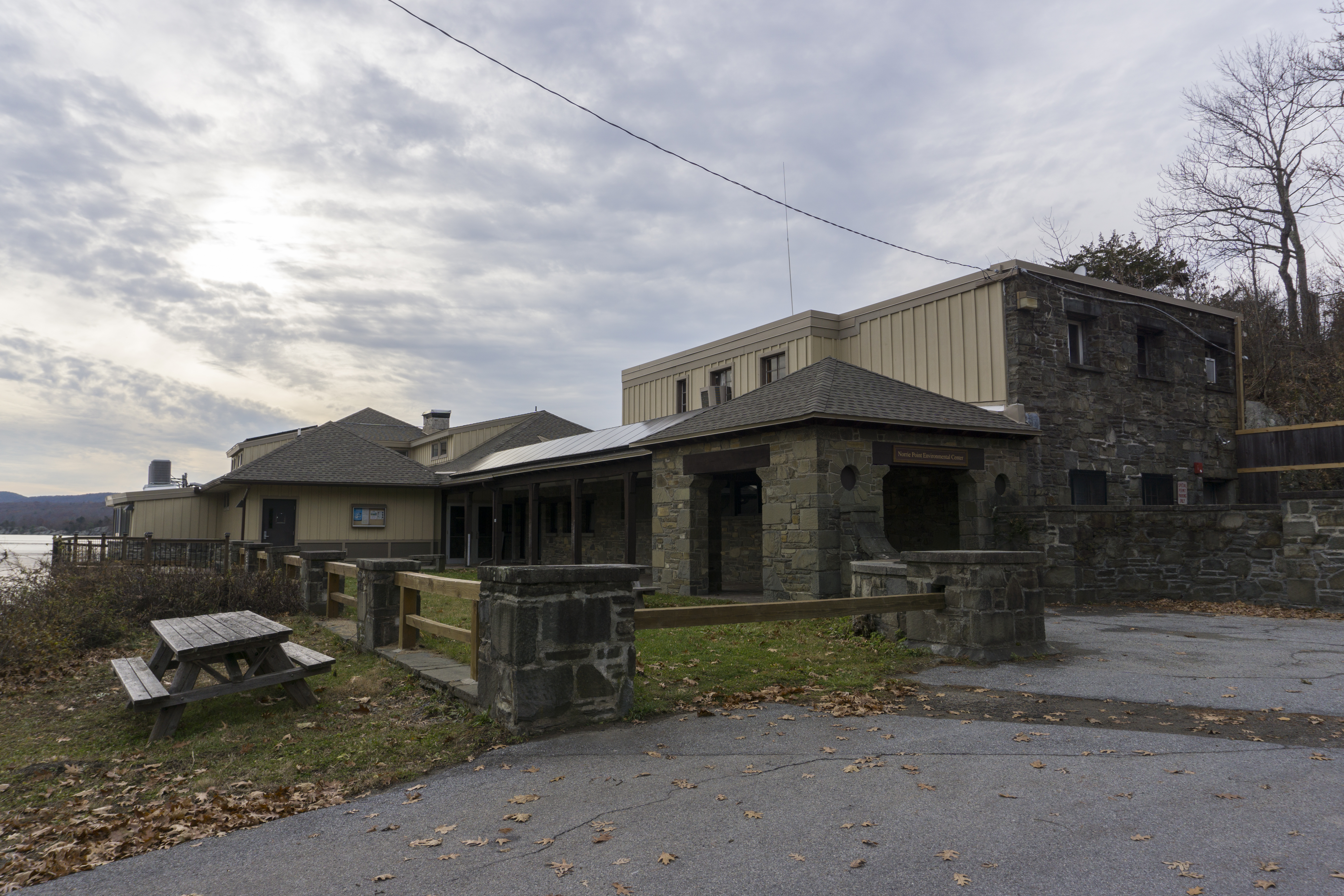
The Norrie Point Environmental Center in Staatsburg, headquarters of the Hudson River National Estuarine Research Reserve

A 30-mile (48 km) stretch on the east bank of the Hudson has been designated the Hudson River Historic District, a National Historic Landmark. The Palisades Interstate Park Commission protects the Palisades on the west bank of the river. The Hudson River was designated as an American Heritage River in 1997. The Hudson River estuary system is part of the National Estuarine Research Reserve System as the Hudson River National Estuarine Research Reserve.

== Transportation and crossings ==
The Hudson River is navigable by large steamers up to Troy, and by ocean-faring vessels to the Port of Albany. The original Erie Canal, opened in 1825 to connect the Hudson with Lake Erie, emptied into the Hudson at the Albany Basin, just 3 miles (4.8 km) south of the Federal Dam in Troy (at mile 134). The canal enabled shipping between cities on the Great Lakes and Europe via the Atlantic Ocean. The New York State Canal System, the successor to the Erie Canal, runs into the Hudson River north of Troy. It also uses the Federal Dam as a lock.

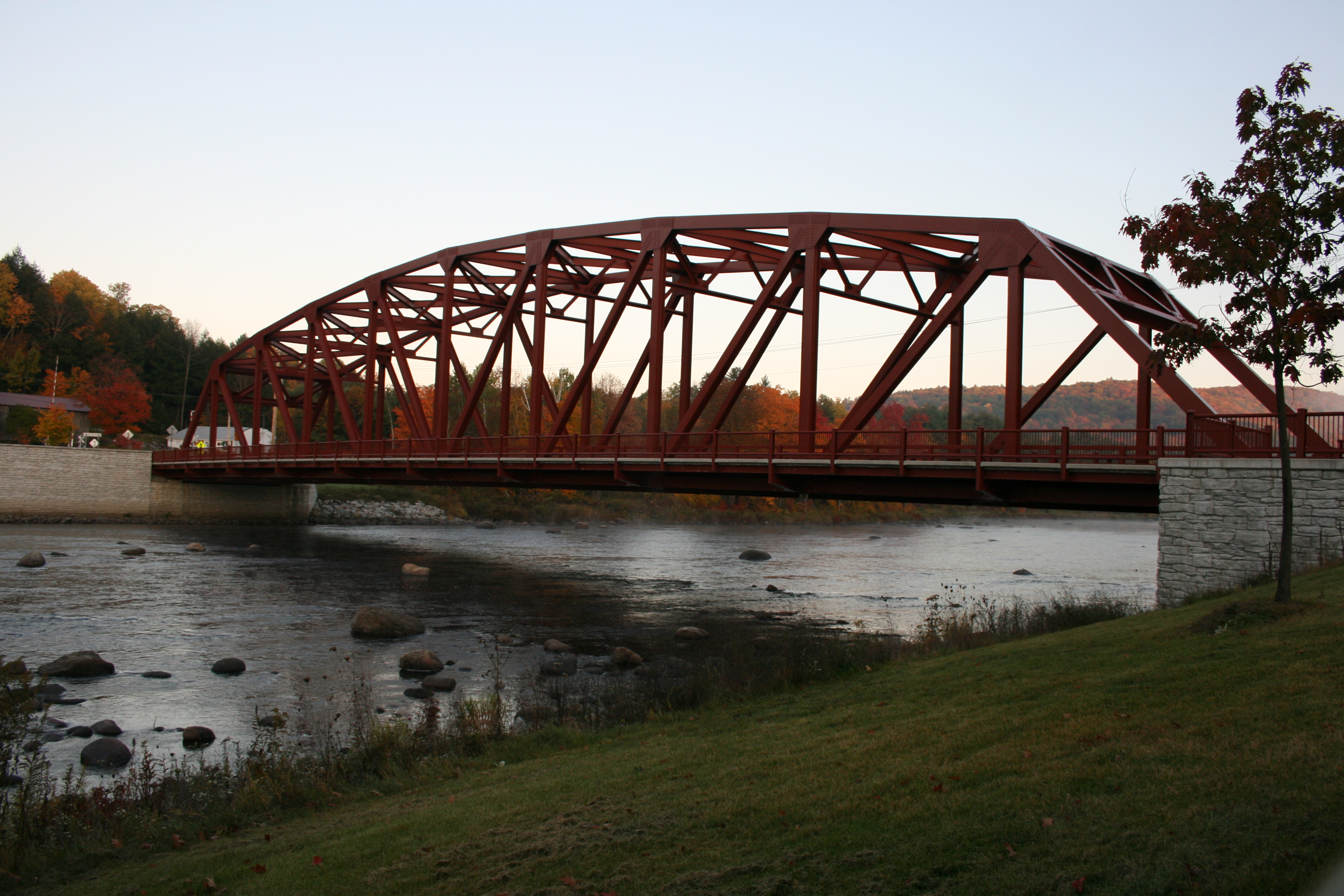
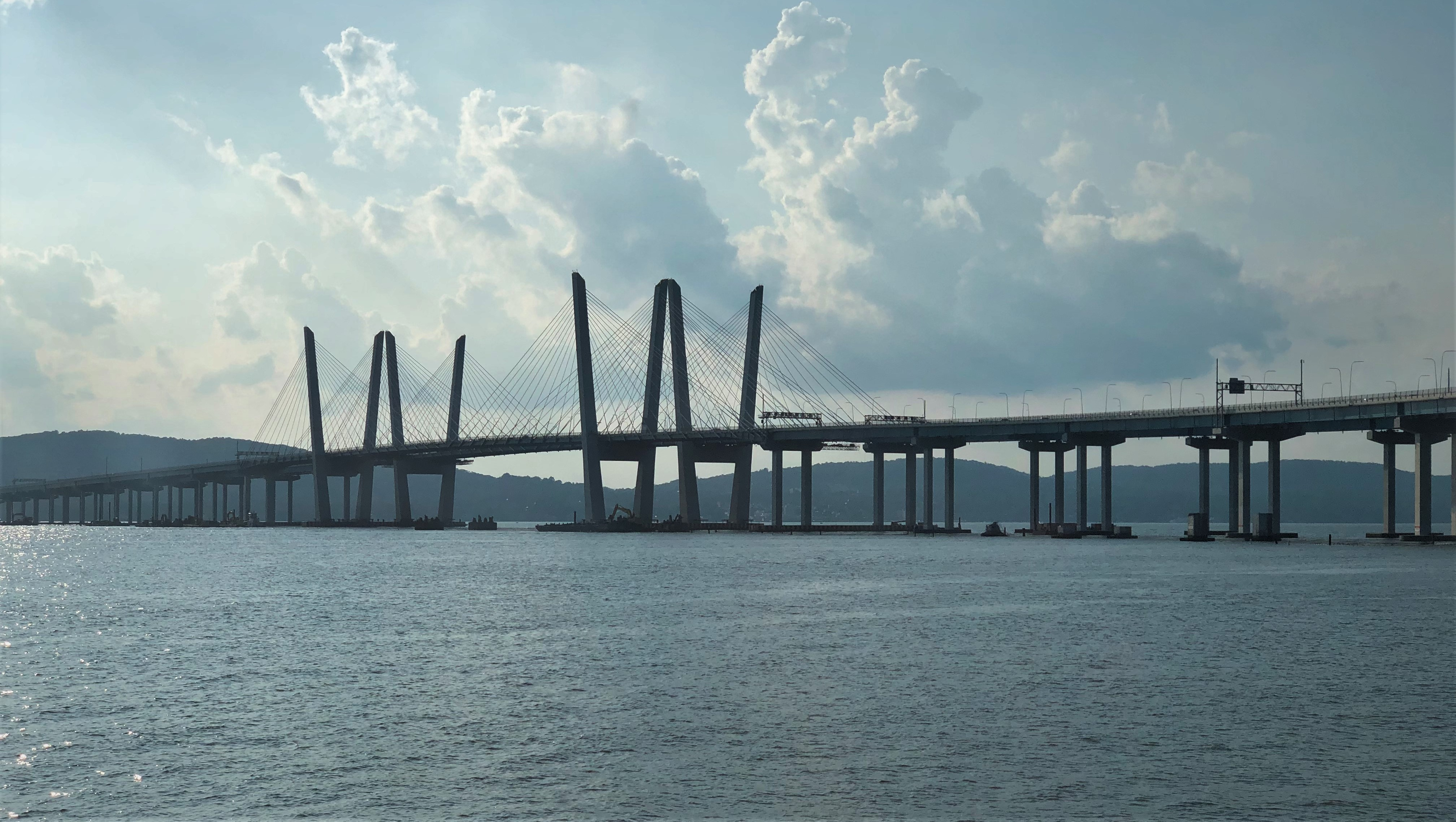
The Riparius Bridge and the Tappan Zee Bridge both cross the Hudson River.

Along the east side of the river runs the Metro-North Railroad's Hudson Line, from Manhattan to Poughkeepsie. The tracks continue north of Poughkeepsie as Amtrak trains run further north to Albany. On the west side of the river, CSX Transportation operates a freight rail line between North Bergen Yard in North Bergen, New Jersey and Selkirk Yard in Selkirk, New York.

The Hudson is crossed at numerous points by bridges, tunnels, and ferries. The width of the Lower Hudson River required major feats of engineering to cross; the results are today visible in the George Washington Bridge and the 1955 Tappan Zee Bridge (replaced by the Mario M. Cuomo Bridge, colloquially referred to as the New Tappan Zee Bridge) as well as the Lincoln and Holland Tunnels and the PATH and Pennsylvania Railroad tubes. The George Washington Bridge, which carries multiple highways, connects Fort Lee, New Jersey to the Washington Heights neighborhood of Upper Manhattan, and is the world's busiest motor vehicle bridge.

The Mario M. Cuomo Bridge is the longest in New York, although the Verrazzano–Narrows Bridge has a larger main span. The Troy Union Bridge between Waterford and Troy was the first bridge over the Hudson; built in 1804 and destroyed in 1909; its replacement, the Troy–Waterford Bridge, was built in 1909. The Rensselaer and Saratoga Railroad was chartered in 1832 and opened in 1835, including the Green Island Bridge, the second bridge over the Hudson south of the Federal Dam.

The Hudson River Day Line offered passenger service on steamboats from New York City to Albany from 1863 until 1962 when it was purchased by Circle Line Sightseeing Cruises.

== Pollution ==
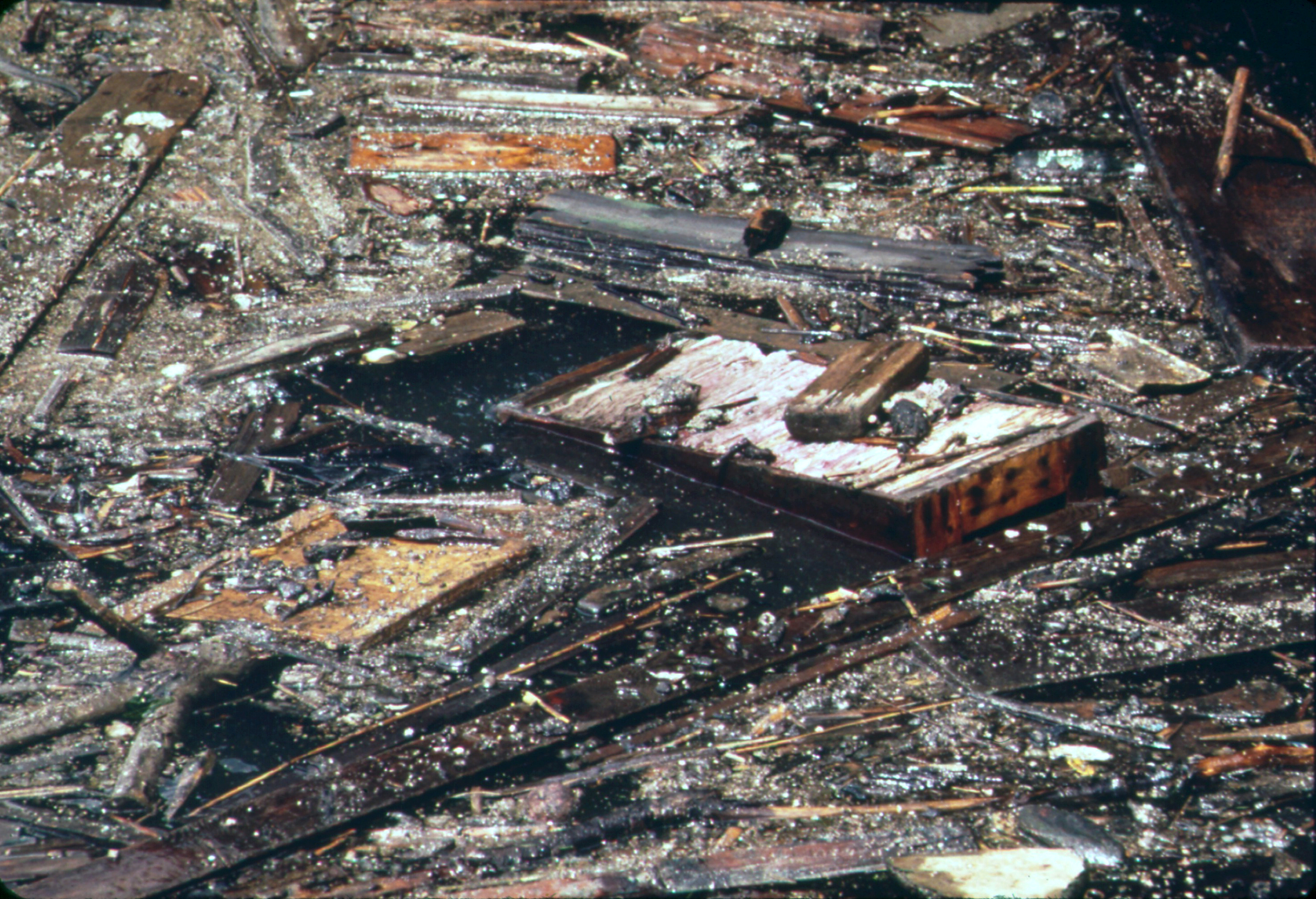
Debris floating on the river near the World Trade Center, 1973

The Hudson River's sediments contain a significant array of pollutants, accumulated over decades from industrial waste discharges, sewage treatment plants, and urban runoff. Water quality in the river has greatly improved since implementation of the 1972 Clean Water Act (CWA). A 2020 report on the health of the river states that "Water quality in the Hudson River Estuary has improved dramatically since 1972 and has remained largely stable in recent years." Ecological health trends, such as in tributaries and wetlands, are varied in condition. The concentrations of toxic pollutants in fish and crabs are lower compared to measurements taken in previous decades, but fishing restrictions and health warnings remain in effect.

The most significant pollution of the Hudson River was contamination of the river by General Electric (GE) with polychlorinated biphenyls (PCBs) between 1947 and 1977. These chemicals caused a range of harmful effects to wildlife and people who ate fish from the river. Other kinds of pollution, including mercury contamination and discharges of partially treated sewage, have also caused ecological problems in the river.

In response to the widespread contamination of the river, activists protested in various ways. A group of fishermen formed an organization in 1966 that would later become Riverkeeper, the first member of the Waterkeeper Alliance. Musician Pete Seeger founded the Hudson River Sloop Clearwater and the Clearwater Festival to draw attention to the problem.

Environmental activism in New York and across the country, and increased attention from members of Congress led to passage of the CWA in 1972. Extensive remediation actions on the river began in the 1970s with the issuance and enforcement of CWA wastewater discharge permits and consequent control or reduction of discharges from industrial facilities and municipal sewage treatment plants.

In 1984, EPA declared a 200-mile (320 km) stretch of the river, from Hudson Falls to New York City, as a Superfund site requiring cleanup, one of the largest such site designations in the country. Sediment removal operations by GE, pursuant to the Superfund orders, have continued into the 21st century.

== Flora and fauna ==
=== Plankton ===
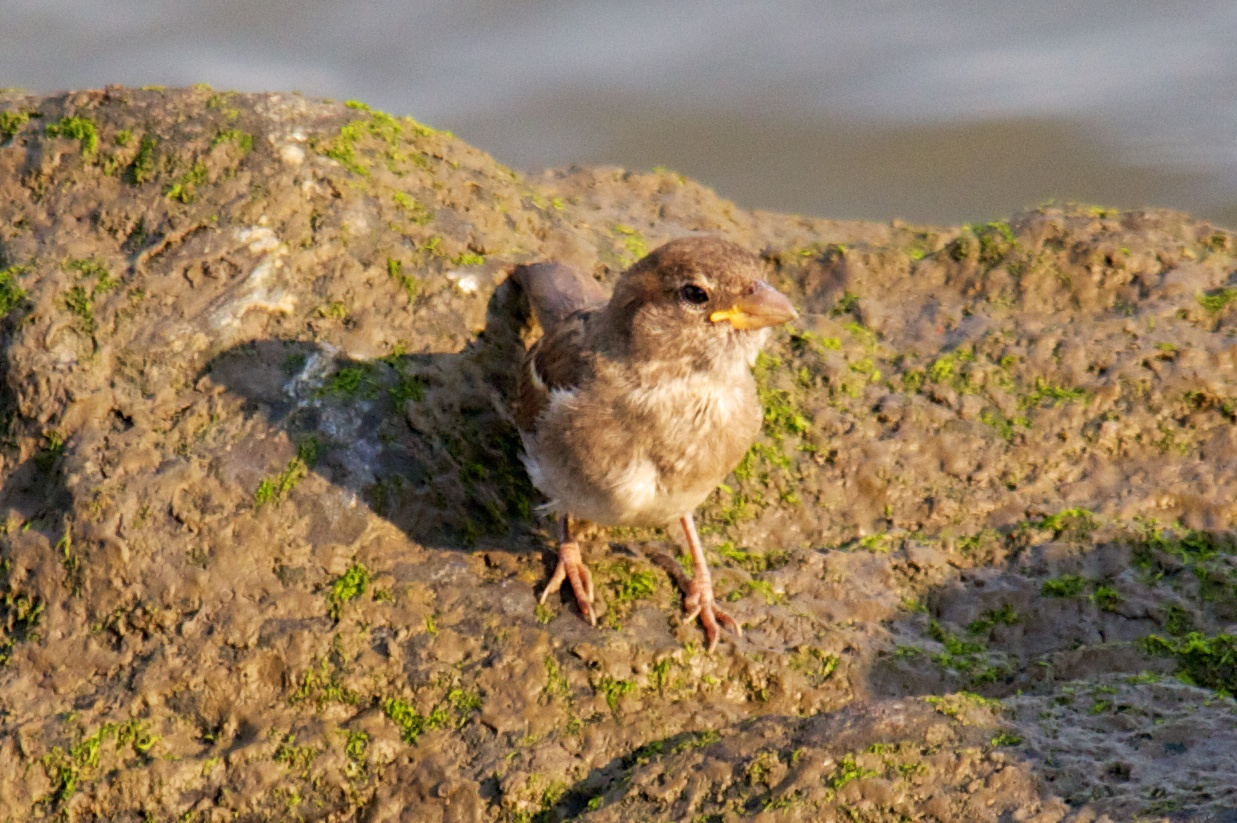
A juvenile house sparrow by the Hudson River

Zooplankton are abundant throughout both fresh and saltwater portions of the river, and provide a crucial food source for larval and juvenile fish.

=== Invertebrates ===
The benthic zone has species capable of living in soft bottom habitats. Within freshwater regions, there are animal species including larvae of chironomid flies, oligochaete worms, predatory fly larvae, and amphipods. In saline regions, there are abundant polychaete annelids, amphipods, and some mollusks such as clams. These species burrow in the sediment and accelerate the breakdown of organic matter. Atlantic blue crabs are among the larger invertebrates, at the northern limit of their range.

The entire Hudson was once far more populated with native suspension-feeding bivalves. Freshwater mussels were common in the river's limnetic zone, but populations have been decreasing for decades, probably from altered habitats and the invasive zebra mussel. Oyster beds were once pervasive in the saltwater portion, but are now reduced through pollution and exploitation.

=== Fish ===
About 220 species of fish, including 173 native species, currently are found in the Hudson River. Commercial fishing was once prominent in the river, although most were shut down in 1976 due to pollution; few survive today. American shad are the only finfish harvested for profit, though in limited numbers.

Species include striped bass, the most important game fish in the Hudson. Estimates of the striped bass population in the Hudson range to nearly 100 million fish. American eels also live in the river before reaching breeding age; for much of this stage they are known as glass eels because of the transparency of their bodies. The fish are the only catadromous species in the Hudson's estuary.

The Atlantic tomcod is a unique species that adapted resistance to the toxic effects of the PCBs polluting the river. Scientists identified the genetic mutation that conferred the resistance, and found that the mutated form was present in 99 percent of the tomcods in the river, compared to fewer than 10 percent of the tomcods from other waters. The hogchoker flatfish have been historically abundant in the river, where farmers would use them for inexpensive livestock feed, giving the fish its name. Other unusual fish found in the river include the northern pipefish, the lined seahorse, and the northern puffer.

The Atlantic sturgeon, a species about 120 million years old, enter the estuary during their annual migrations. The fish grow to a considerable size, up to 15 feet (4.6 m) and 800 pounds (360 kg). The fish are the symbol of the Hudson River Estuary. Their smoked flesh was commonly eaten in the river valley since 1779, and it was sometimes known as "Albany beef". The city of Albany was called "Sturgeondom" or "Sturgeontown" in the 1850s and 1860s, with its residents known as "Sturgeonites". The "Sturgeondom" name lost popularity around 1900. The fish have been off limits from fishing since 1998. The river's population of shortnose sturgeon have quadrupled since the 1970s, and are also off limits to all fishing as they are a federally endangered species.

Lined seahorse or northern seahorse (Hippocampus erectus) are found in the brackish waters of the Lower New York Bay, New York Harbor and surrounding waters (including Raritan Bay and Sandy Hook Bay) and the Hudson River estuary.

=== Marine and invasive species ===
Marine life is known to exist in the estuary, with seals, crabs, and some whales reported. On March 29, 1647, a white whale swam up the river to the Rensselaerswyck (near Albany). Herman Melville, author of Moby-Dick, lived in and near Albany from 1830 to 1847, and was known to have ancestry from New Netherland, leading some to believe stories of the whale sighting inspired his novel.

Non-native species often originate in New York Harbor, a center of long-distance commerce. Over 100 foreign species reside in the river and its banks. Many of these have had significant effects on the ecosystem and natural habitats. The water chestnut produces a vegetative mat that reduces oxygen content in the water below, enhances sedimentation, impedes small vessel navigation, and is a hazard to swimmers and walkers. The zebra mussel arrived in the Hudson in 1989 and has spread through the river's freshwater region, reducing photoplankton and river oxygen levels. Positively, the mussel clears suspended particles, allowing for more light to aquatic vegetation. In saltwater areas, the green crab spread in the early 20th century and the Japanese shore crab has become dominant in recent years.

=== Habitats ===
The Hudson has a diverse array of habitat types. Most of the river consists of deep water habitats, though its tidal wetlands of freshwater and salt marshes are among the most ecologically important. There is strong biological diversity, including intertidal vegetation like freshwater cattails and saltwater cordgrasses. Shallow coves and bays are often covered with submarine vegetation; shallower areas harbor diverse benthic fauna. Abundance of food varies over location and time, stemming from seasonal flows of nutrients. The Hudson's large volume of suspended sediments reduces light penetration in the area's water column, which reduces photoplankton photosynthesis and prevents sub-aquatic vegetation from growing beyond shallow depths. The oxygen-producing phytoplankton have also been inhibited by the relatively recent invasion of the zebra mussel species.

The Hudson River estuary is the site of wetlands from New York City all the way up to Troy. It has one of the largest concentrations of freshwater wetlands in the Northeast. Even though the river can be considered brackish further south, 80 percent of the wetlands are outside the influence of the saltwater coming from the Atlantic Ocean. Currently, the river has about 7,000 acres (28 km^{2}) acres of wetlands, and rising sea levels due to climate change are expected to lead to an expansion of that area. Wetlands are expected to migrate upland as sea level (and thus the level of the river) rises. This is different from the rest of the world, where rising sea levels usually leads to a reduction in wetland areas. The expansion of the wetlands are expected to provide more habitat to the fish and birds of the region.

== Activities ==
The Hudson River can be explored on overnight river cruises between New York City and Albany, NY.

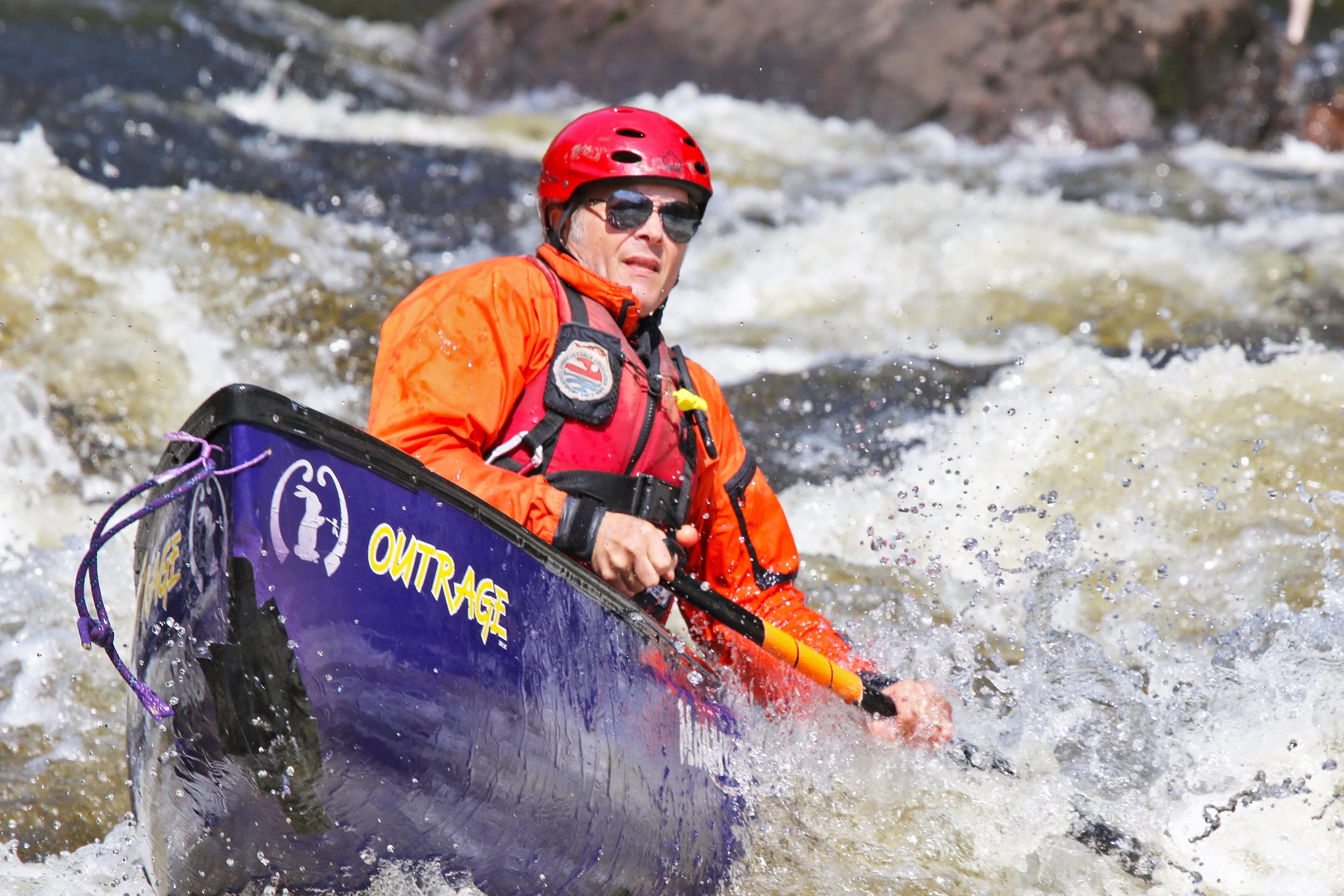
Rapids on the Hudson River Gorge

Parkland surrounds much of the Hudson River; prominent parks include Battery Park and Liberty State Park at the river's mouth, Hudson River Park and Riverside Park in Manhattan, Croton Point Park, Bear Mountain State Park, Storm King State Park and the Hudson Highlands, Moreau Lake State Park, and its source in the High Peaks Wilderness Area.

The New Tappan Zee Bridge between Westchester and Rockland counties has a pedestrian and bicycling path covering a distance of about 3.6 miles. Another pedestrian and bike path exists further north, between Dutchess and Ulster Counties: Walkway Over the Hudson, which has a one-way length of 1.2 miles.

Fishing is allowed in the river, although the state Department of Health recommends eating no fish caught from the South Glens Falls Dam to the Federal Dam at Troy. Women under 50 and children under 15 are not advised to eat any fish caught south of the Palmer Falls Dam in Corinth, while others are advised to eat anywhere from one to four meals per month of Hudson River fish, depending on species and location caught. The Department of Health cites mercury, PCBs, dioxin, and cadmium as the chemicals impacting fish in these areas.

Common native species recreationally fished include striped bass (formerly a major commercial species, now only legally taken by anglers), channel catfish, white catfish, brown bullhead, yellow perch, and white perch. The nonnative largemouth and smallmouth bass are also popular, and serve as the focus of catch-and-release fishing tournaments.

The Hudson River can be canoed and kayaked for its entire length from Henderson Lake (GPS 44.091974, -74.057768) to the Atlantic Ocean at New York City. The upper section includes the Hudson River Gorge, a spectacular 17-mile Class IV whitewater run. The Hudson River Greenway Water Trail runs for much of the river, from Saratoga County in the Adirondack Park to Battery Park in Manhattan.

The annual New York City Jet Ski Invasion is a group ride for personal watercraft that runs along the Hudson River from the Battery to the George Washington Bridge.

== See also ==
- Geography of New York–New Jersey Harbor Estuary
- Hudson River Museum
- Hudson River Region AVA
- List of fixed crossings of the Hudson River
- List of ferries across the Hudson River in New York City
- List of Hudson River islands
- List of New Jersey rivers
- List of New York rivers
