= Spier Falls =

- Location within New York Adirondack Park Location within the United States
- Location: ESE of Corinth
- Coordinates: 43°14′05″N 73°45′24″W
- Elevation: 407 ft (124 m)
- Watercourse: Hudson River

Spier Falls is a waterfall on the Hudson River between Saratoga County and Warren County, New York. It is located east-southeast of the Village of Corinth. The Spier Falls Dam was built here to provide hydroelectric electricity.
