= Quaker Springs, New York =

Hamlet in New York, United States

Coordinates: 43°02′22″N 73°38′34″W

Quaker Springs is a hamlet in Saratoga County, New York, United States. The zip code is 12871. Quaker Springs is between NY-32 Route 4. Quaker Springs United Methodist Church is located in the hamlet. An anti-slavery society was based in Quaker Springs and several possible participants in the Underground Railroad were in Quaker Springs. The name Quaker Springs came from a type of mineral spring located in the area. The area including Quaker Springs was involved in Revolutionary War positions.

== See also ==
- Schuylerville
- Saratoga Springs
