= Bakers Falls =

- Location within New York Adirondack Park Location within the United States
- Location: Hudson Falls
- Coordinates: 43°17′50″N 73°35′27″W
- Elevation: 207 ft (63 m)
- Watercourse: Hudson River

Bakers Falls is a waterfall on the Hudson River in Washington County, New York. It is located in the Village of Hudson Falls.
