= Hudson River National Estuarine Research Reserve =

Research reserve in New York State

Coordinates: 41.2983°N 73.9767°W

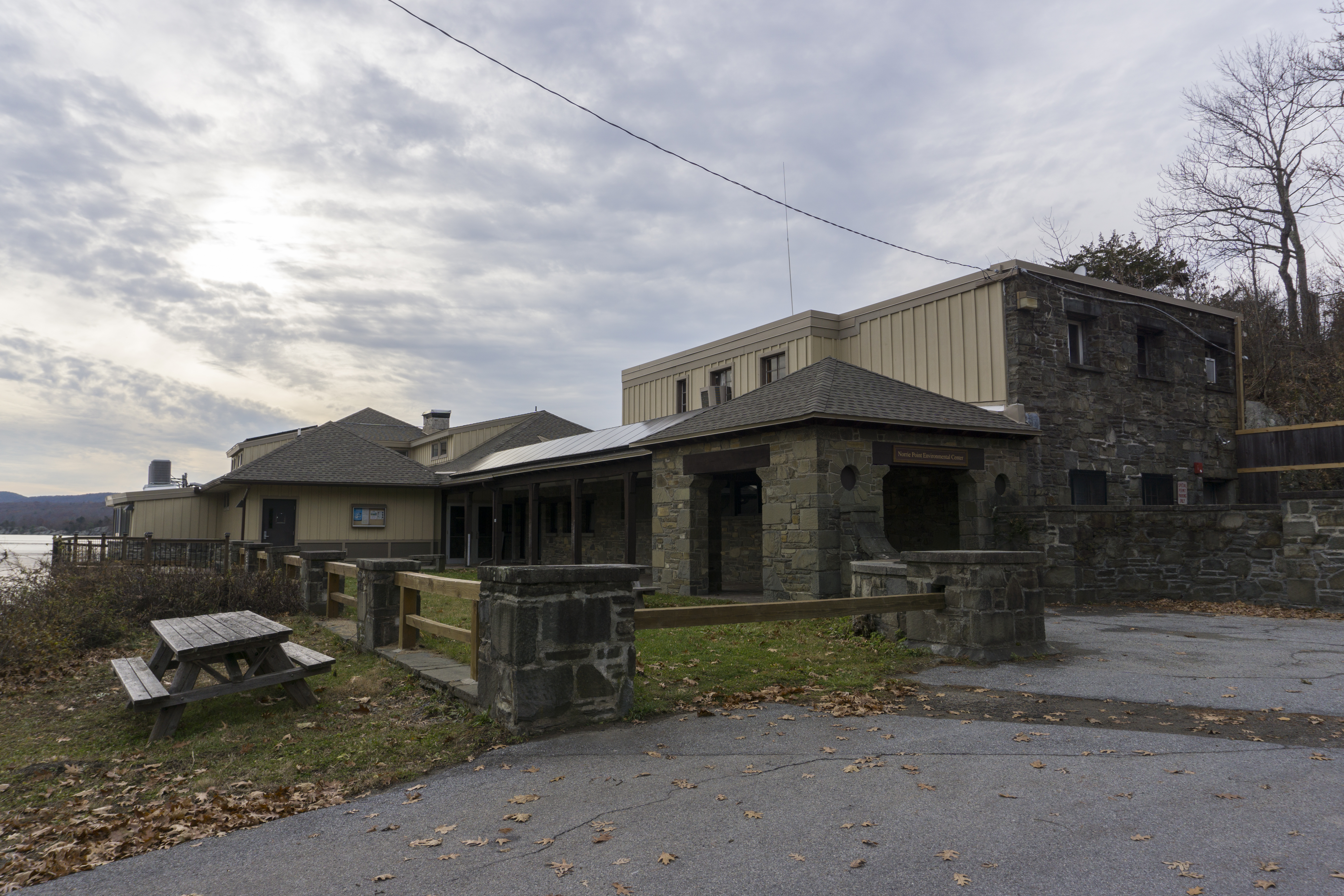
The Norrie Point Environmental Center, headquarters of the reserve, in Hyde Park, New York

The Hudson River National Estuarine Research Reserve is a National Estuarine Research Reserve in the state of New York.

Home to more than 200 species of fish, the Hudson River serves as a nursery ground for such important fish as sturgeon, striped bass and American shad. It also supports a corresponding abundance of other river-dependent wildlife, especially birds.

The river is profoundly influenced by the ocean's tides for over half its length, creating an estuary which stretches 153 miles (246 km) and includes a wide range of wetland habitats. The reserve sites reflect this diversity, from the brackish marshes of Piermont to the slightly brackish wetlands of Iona Island, and the freshwater tidal mudflats and marshes of Tivoli Bays and Stockport Flats.
