= Federal Dam (Troy) =

Coordinates: 42°45′7.2″N 73°41′15.66″W

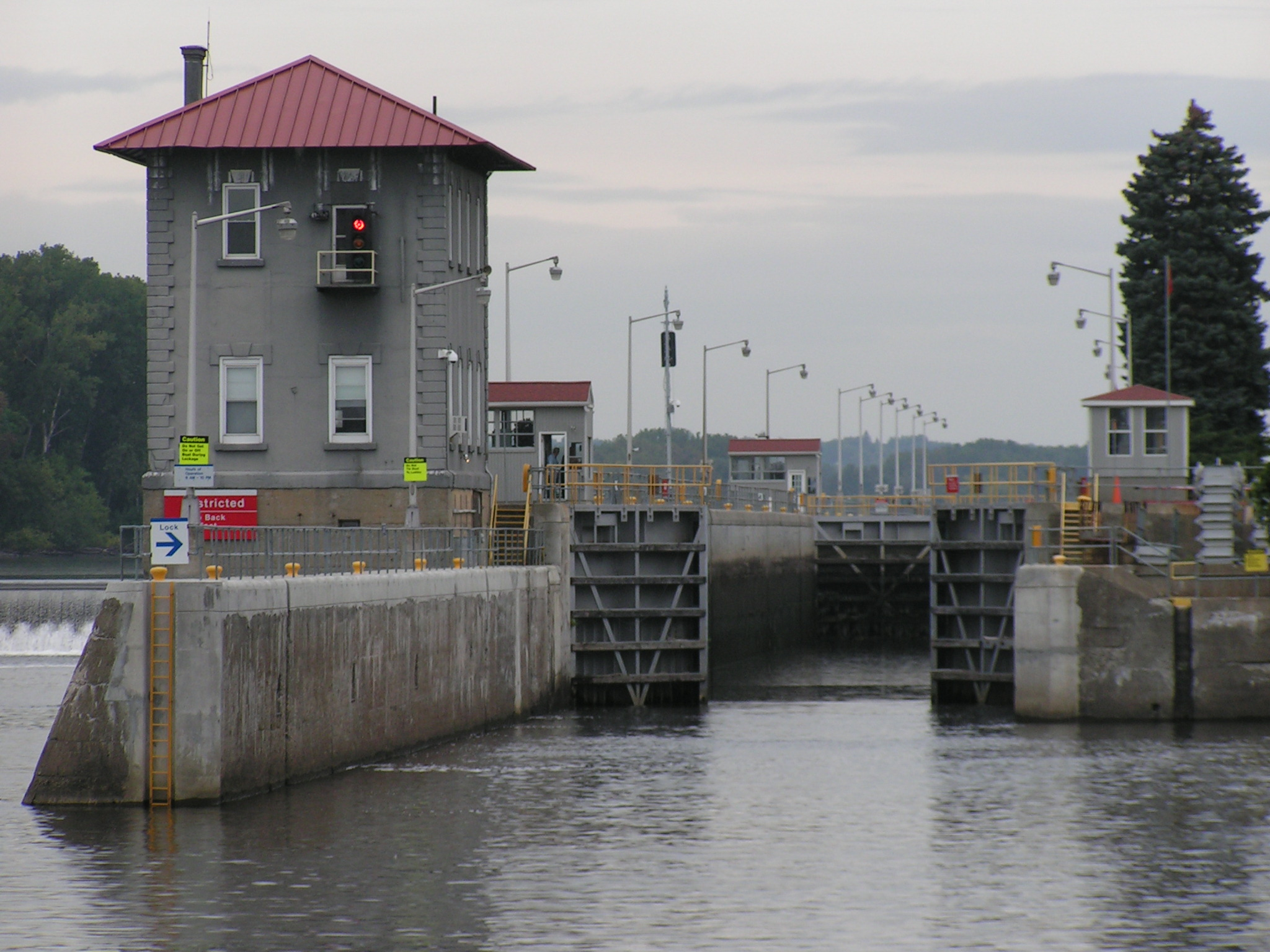
- Interactive map of Federal Dam
- Country: United States
- Location: Troy, New York
- Status: Operational
- Opening date: 1916

The Federal Dam is a manmade dam built across the Hudson River in the U.S. state of New York from Troy on the east bank to Green Island on the west bank. The major function of the dam is to improve navigability. It is located at mile 153 of the Hudson River, measuring from the beginning of the Hudson as a Federally Navigable Waterway near the Battery in Manhattan. The location of the dam marks the upper end of the Hudson River estuary, the furthest reach of tidal influence.

== The Federal Lock ==
In order to allow ships to move freely, the eastern end of the dam contains a lock, commonly called the Federal Lock or (on some charts and publications) the "Troy-US Lock". The lock, which was opened in 1916, has a single chamber and is 520 feet (160 m) long, 45 feet (14 m) wide, 17 feet (5.2 m) deep, and has a lift of approximately 14 feet (4.3 m). Although it is the first lock encountered by vessels passing from the Hudson River into the Great Lakes by way of the New York State Canal System, and it is sometimes referred to as lock "E-1", it is not part of the Erie Canal (which officially has no "Lock 1"), nor maintained by the New York State Canal Corporation. Both the lock and the dam were built and are operated by the U.S. Army Corps of Engineers.

== See also ==
- List of reservoirs and dams in New York
