= Halls Corner =

Halls Corner may refer to:

- Halls Corner, California
- Halls Corner, Michigan
- Halls Corner, New Jersey
- Halls Corner, New York, a place in New York
