= Teva Learning Alliance =

US non-profit organization

- Industry: Non-profit
- Founded: 1994
- Headquarters: New York City, US
- Key people: Nili Simhai (Director); Alexandra Kuperman (Assistant Director)
- Website: www.tevalearningcenter.org

The Teva Learning Alliance (formerly Teva Learning Center) is a Jewish-based environmental education 501(c)(3) non-profit organization that teaches about Judaism and the environment at Jewish day schools, summer camps and Hebrew schools. It is the only full-time year-round program providing innovative, experiential Jewish and nature-based education.

== History and mission ==
The Teva Learning Center was founded in 1994 by and is based at the Isabella Freedman Jewish Retreat Center and Surprise Lake Camp.

The Teva Learning Center seeks "to renew the ecological wisdom inherent in Judaism" by "immersing participants in the natural world."

Its director, Nili Simhai, won the 2009 Covenant Foundation award for Excellence in Jewish Education. In 2014, Teva and the Isabella Freedman Jewish Retreat Center merged with the Jewish environmental organization Hazon.

== Programs ==
The Teva Learning Center is a Jewish education group which engages in environmental education and activism through the context of Judaism. Teva's education centers on the preservation of the environment from a Jewish point of view. Teva frequently teaches children in Jewish day schools teaches as well as synagogues, camps and youth groups. Teva provides a hands-on approach to environmental education.

=== Bring It Back To Our School ===
Teva provides workshops on the environment and outdoor experiences along the East Coast at 45 different schools working with about 4,000 students annually.

Part of this is teaching students that they are Shomrei Adamah ('Keepers of the Earth'):

Shomrei Adamah ('Keepers of the Earth'), is for fifth- and sixth-grade day-school students who visit a retreat center for four days and make a 'brit adamah,' or covenant with the earth, to engage in environmental activity. The Center also runs a program for junior-high students, Achdoot ('Togetherness'), in which the teens camp in the wilderness, usually a state campground.

In June 2009, students from the Solomon Schechter Day School of Raritan Valley in New Jersey were presented with the 'Kids for Clean Communities Award' for the recycling program they developed at their school after attending the Teva program.

=== Birkat HaChamah ===
In 2014, Teva purchased a bus previously owned by Ben & Jerry's founder Ben Cohen for use in environmental classes. The bus was incorporated into environmental awareness programs related to Birkat Hachamah or Blessing of the Sun. However, Orthodox Talmudic scholar Rabbi J. David Bleich of Yeshiva University, (a specialist in Birkat Hachamah) has criticized this interpretation of Judaism as a notably environmental faith. He argues that environmental problems are "issues in and of themselves and are totally unrelated to the blessing of the sun," as the blessing is an occasion to acknowledge the wonder of God's creations, not a political statement. "I suppose you can connect anything," he says. "You can draw dots and lines; you don't have to be logical.".

=== Farm Fellowships ===
Teva offers a three-month fellowship in environmental farming and Jewish values.

=== Teva Seminar ===
An annual four-day program designed to train over 100 participants to develop programs in their 'home' institutions.
