= Brunswick Square (shopping mall) =

Defunct mall in East Brunswick, New Jersey, U.S.

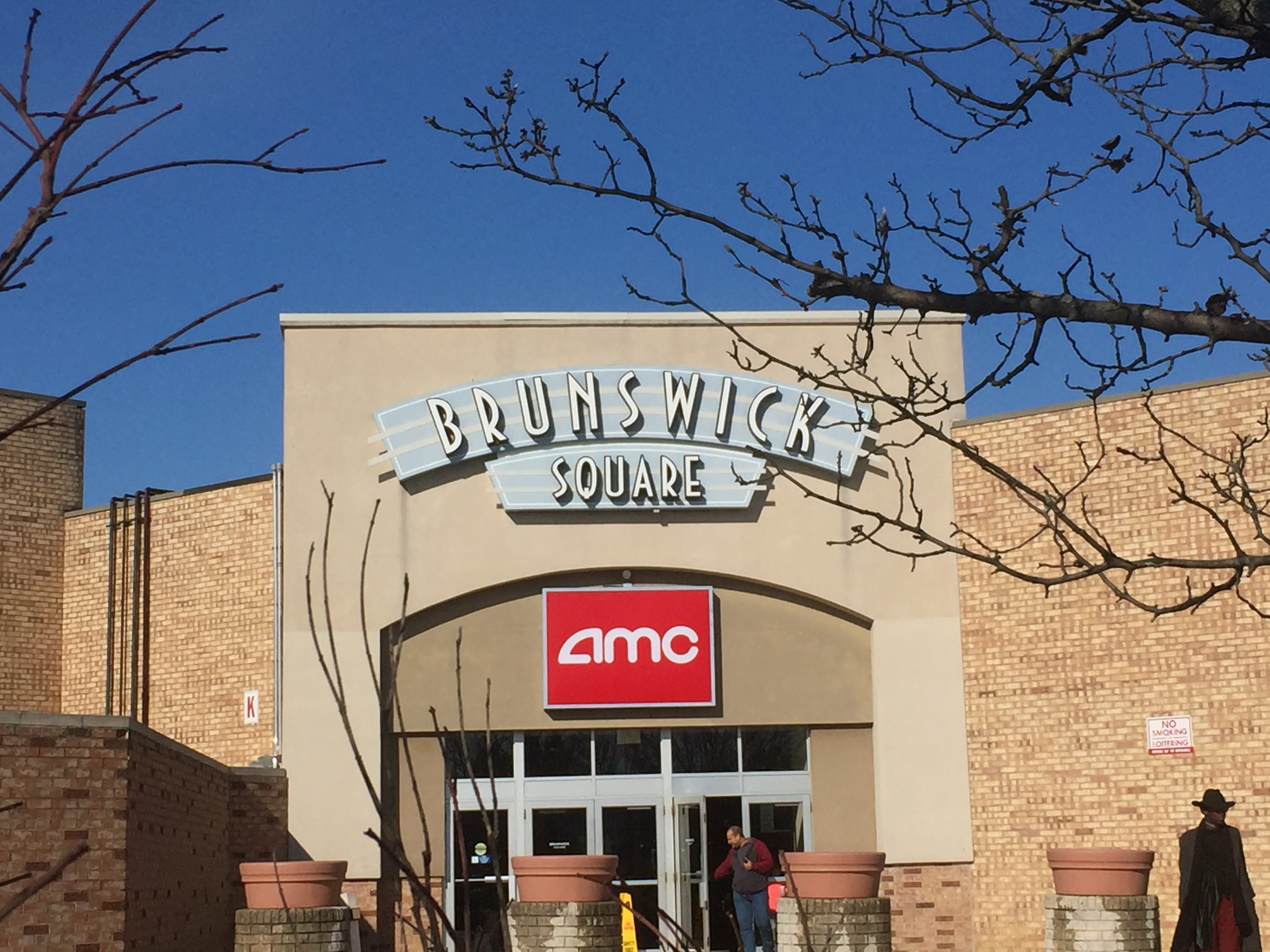
- One of the two main entrances
- Location: East Brunswick, New Jersey, U.S.
- Coordinates: 40.423347°N 74.382259°W
- Opened: 1970; 56 years ago
- Closed: January 10, 2026; 9 months ago
- Developer: Edward J. DeBartolo Corporation
- Manager: Paramount Realty Group
- Owner: Paramount Realty Group
- Num. of stores: 60+ (at peak)
- Num. of anchor tenants: 2
- Floor area: 769,041 sq ft (71,446.2 m^{2})
- Floors: 1 (2 in JCPenney, 2 in Macy's, former 3rd floor in Macy’s)
- Parking: Parking lot
- Public transit: NJ Transit bus: 811, 818
- Website: shopbrunswicksquare.com

Brunswick Square, colloquially known as the Brunswick Square Mall, was a single story shopping mall located in East Brunswick, New Jersey, at the intersection of Route 18 and Rues Lane. The now-closed mall is owned and managed by Paramount Realty Group and has gross leasable area (GLA) of 769,041 sq ft (71,446.2 m^{2}). The current anchor stores are JCPenney and Macy's.

The mall's interior closed on January 10, 2026, with plans to convert the mall into an open-air shopping center that will include some of the existing tenants, with medical and recreation uses added to the format.

== History ==
Brunswick Square Mall was built on land that was formerly the Ostroski Farm on Rues Lane. The Ostroski family sold the land to the Macy's Corporation in 1969 for the construction of Bamberger's, which opened in 1970. Anchor JCPenney and the mall portion, originally owned by DeBartolo Corporation, opened in 1973. Bamberger's became Macy's in 1986 when the chain was phased out in favor of the Macy's name.

In 1999, a smaller expansion took place that added a Barnes & Noble and expanded the movie theater to 13 stadium seating screens. The theater expansion occupied an adjacent McCrory's. Several eateries were incorporated into the movie theater, including Nathan's Famous, Ben & Jerry's and Auntie Anne's to make up for a lack of a proper food court. Also that year, Simon Property Group acquired the mall from DeBartolo.

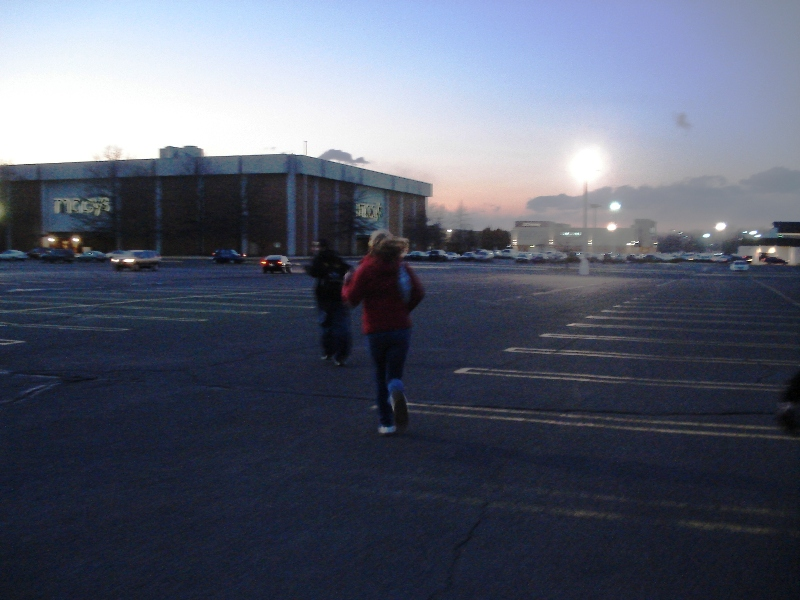
The mall from the parking lot near Macy's in March 2007

In October 2000, the interior of the mall was renovated in which new ceilings, skylights, flooring and lighting was installed and a second main entrance was constructed on the west side of the mall through a space formerly occupied by Kinney Shoes, next to Spencer's Gifts. In 2011, JCPenney underwent major renovations to give the store a new look and add a Sephora inside the department store.

Numerous stores have come and gone since 2011. The movie theater Mega Movies closed down and was replaced by Starplex Cinemas in 2011. Starplex had also bought the fast food franchise licenses of the Nathan's Famous and Ben & Jerry's from Mega Movies but subsequently decided to close the ice cream store due to a lack of revenue. In early 2013, construction was completed on a new entrance and hallway anchored with a Panera Bread, Tilted Kilt and GoWireless. In 2015, Starplex Cinemas was bought out by AMC Theatres. Also in 2015, the Subway sandwich store closed and was replaced by the Pop in Cafe. The Pop In Cafe has since closed.

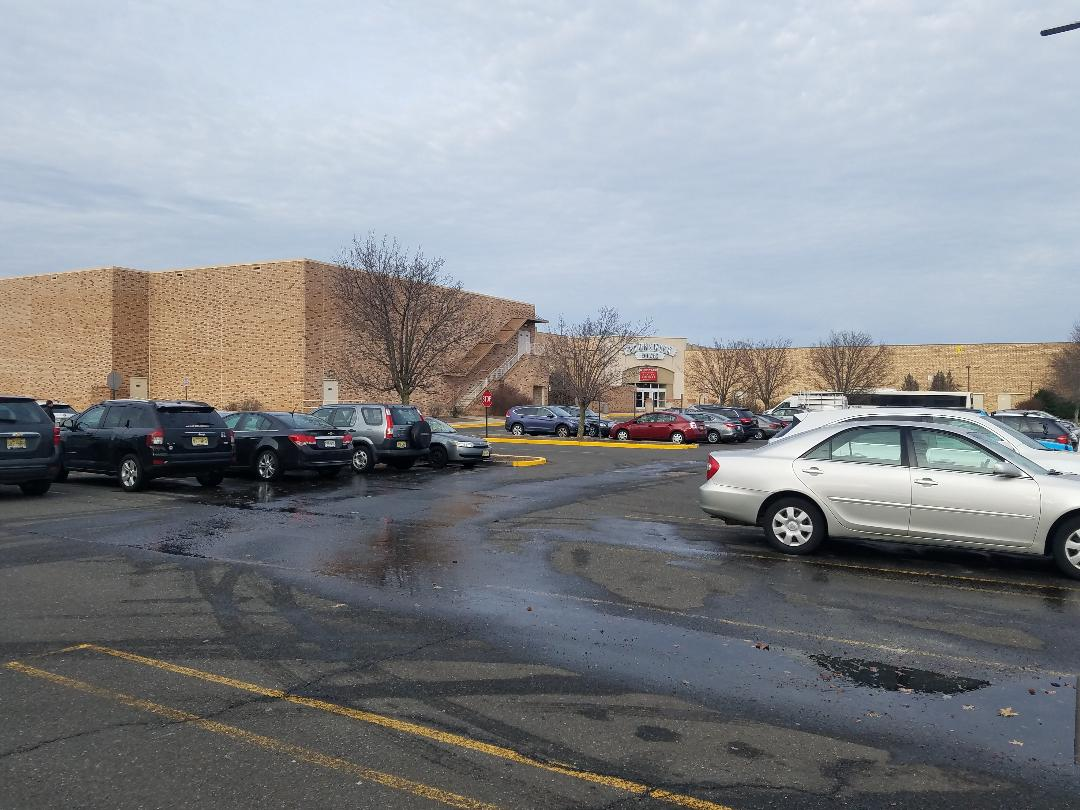
The mall's south entrance near the AMC Theatres in January 2018

In 2016, Simon Property Group sold the mall to WP Glimcher. Also that year, Ruby Tuesday closed to make way for Bar Louie and Red Robin. Bar Louie opened in late-2016 and Red Robin opened in August 2017. In addition, Rainbow moved next to Famous Footwear during this time and its former storefront was used for Red Robin.

Pups of War, a nerf blaster arena, opened in June 2021.

In November 2023, the mall was sold again, this time to Paramount Realty Group, a Lakewood based owner of numerous shopping centers in the area. This was the first mall Paramount has purchased, and has since acquired the Neshaminy Mall in Pennsylvania.

Bar Louie closed in March 2025, while Red Robin closed in June for redevelopment plans. Macy's was converted into a clearance store in September 2025, and closed off the third floor.

The mall closed permanently on January 10, 2026, with plans to convert it into an open-air shopping center. The mall will be removing the Macy’s clearance store by 2027, and replace the store with a different store.
