= Brookview =

Brookview may refer to:

- Brookview, Maryland
- Brookview, New Jersey
- Brookview, New York
