= Robert Asaro-Angelo =

American labor leader

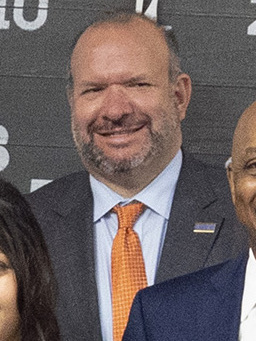

Commissioner of New Jersey Department of Labor and Workforce Development
- Incumbent
- Assumed office 2018
- Governor: Phil Murphy

Personal details
- Party: Democratic
- Education: Boston University; Rutgers University

Robert Asaro-Angelo is an American labor leader and former commissioner of the New Jersey Department of Labor and Workforce Development.

== Biography ==
Asaro-Angelo was raised in a union family and is a son of a longtime Atlantic City labor organizer. From 2010 until 2017, he was Eastern Regional Representative for the U.S. Department of Labor, where he managed the department's regional activities and coordinated federal efforts on the regional, state and local levels. He also served on intergovernmental work groups such as the White House Hurricane Sandy Task Force, White House Task Force on Puerto Rico, Regional U.S. Interagency Councils on Homeless and FEMA's Recovery Support Function Leadership Group.

He also has worked for the Laborers' International Union of North America (LiUNA), AFSCME, and 1199SEIU United Healthcare Workers East. He served as executive director of the New Jersey Democratic State Committee in 2008, during the transition of Bush to Obama, when Senator Joe Cryan served as state party chairman.

He holds a Bachelor of Science in Communications from Boston University and a Masters in Public Policy from the Eagleton Institute of Politics at Rutgers University.

In January 2018, New Jersey Governor Phil Murphy nominated Asaro-Angelo for Commissioner of Labor and Workforce Development. He was confirmed by the New Jersey Senate on March 26, 2018, on a 38–0 vote.

In February 2021, Governor Murphy appointed Asaro-Angelo Co-Chair of the New Jersey Council on the Green Economy.

Asaro-Angelo left his post in 2026 after the election of Mikie Sherrill, who nominated Kevin Jarvis to lead the labor department. Jarvis began serving as acting commissioner.

Asaro-Angelo lives in East Brunswick, New Jersey.
