= East Brunswick, New Jersey =

Township in Middlesex County, New Jersey, US

- Township
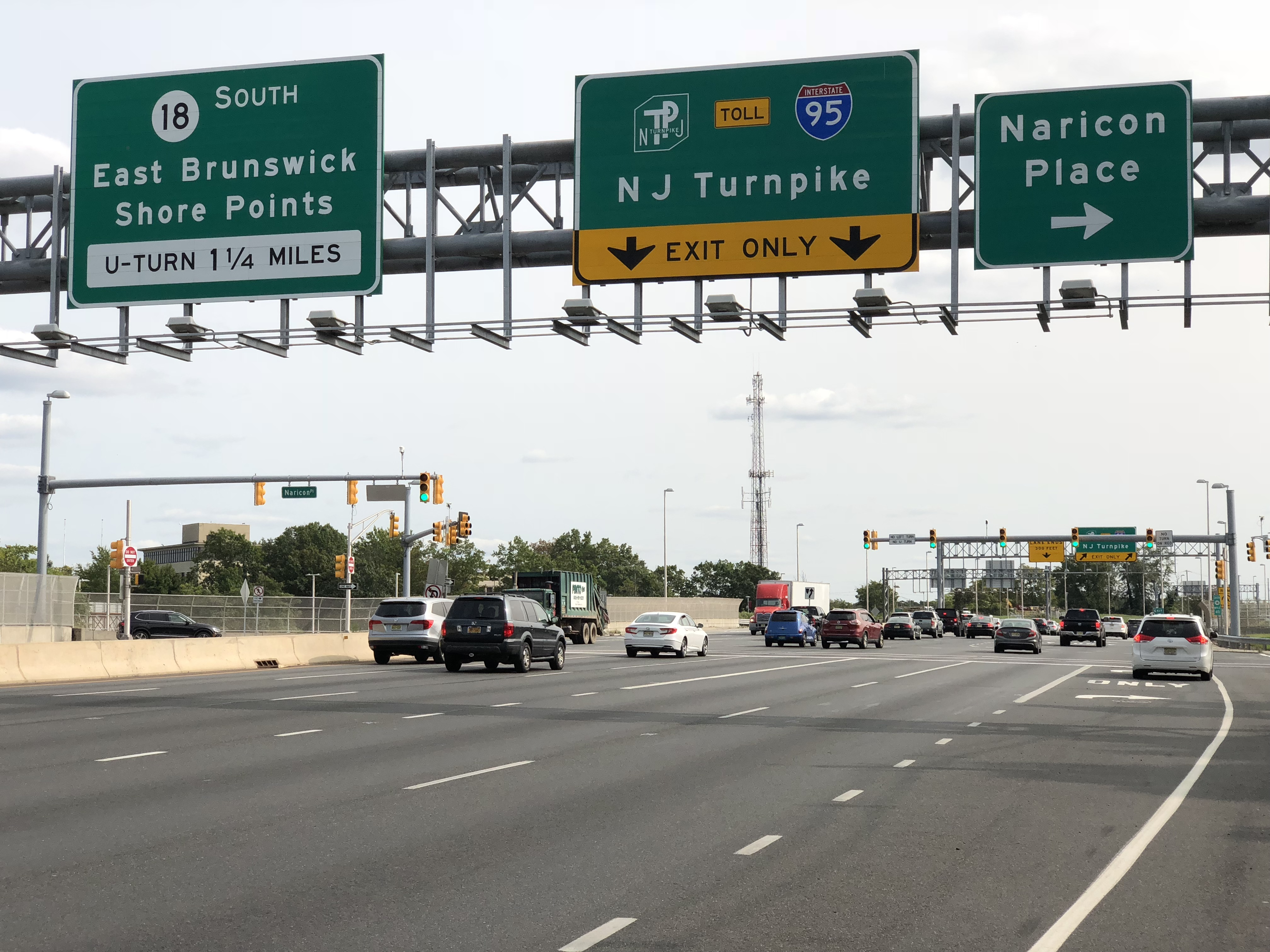
- Busy Route 18 in East Brunswick, the geographical center of population of the U.S. state of New Jersey

- Seal

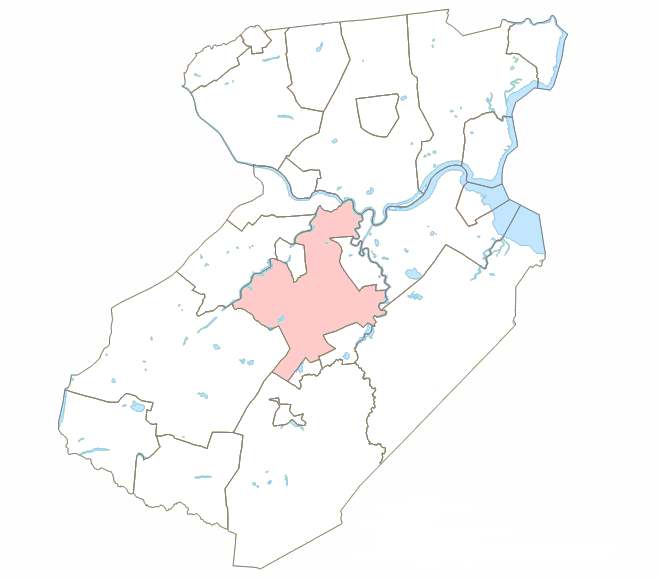
- Location of East Brunswick in Middlesex County highlighted in pink

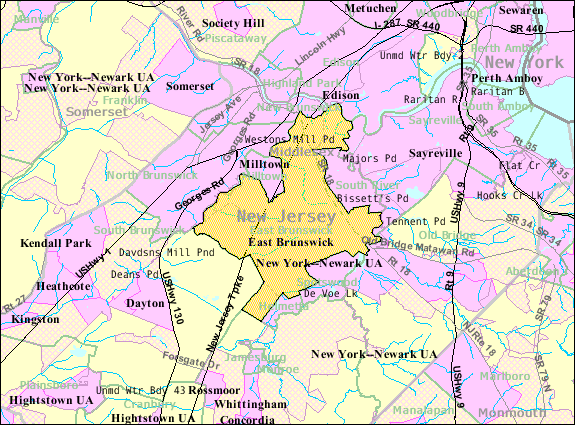
- Census Bureau map of East Brunswick, New Jersey
- Interactive map of East Brunswick, New Jersey
- Location in Middlesex County Location in New Jersey Location in the United States
- Coordinates: 40.426249°N 74.418244°W
- Country: United States
- State: New Jersey
- County: Middlesex
- Incorporated: February 28, 1860

Government
  - Type: Faulkner Act (mayor–council)
  - Body: Ayan Aslam Council
  - Mayor: Brad J. Cohen (D, term ends December 31, 2028)
  - Administrator: Joseph Criscuolo
  - Municipal clerk: Tamar Lawful

Area
  - Total: 22.36 sq mi (57.91 km^{2})
  - Land: 21.78 sq mi (56.42 km^{2})
  - Water: 0.57 sq mi (1.48 km^{2}) 2.56%
  - Rank: 123rd of 565 in state 6th of 25 in county
- Elevation: 131 ft (40 m)

Population (2020)
  - Total: 49,715
  - Estimate (2024): 51,086
  - Rank: 38th of 565 in state 7th of 25 in county
  - Density: 2,282.2/sq mi (881.2/km^{2})
  - Rank: 273rd of 565 in state 20th of 25 in county
- Time zone: UTC−05:00 (EST)
  - Summer (DST): UTC−04:00 (Eastern (EDT))
- ZIP Code: 08816
- Area code: 732
- FIPS code: 3402319000
- GNIS feature ID: 0882163
- Website: www.eastbrunswick.org

East Brunswick is a township in Middlesex County, in the U.S. state of New Jersey. The suburban bedroom community is part of the New York metropolitan area and is located on the southern shore of the Raritan River, directly adjacent to New Brunswick and located roughly 29 miles (47 km) away from New York City. As of the 2020 United States census, the township's population was 49,715, its highest decennial count ever and an increase of 2,203 (+4.6%) from the 2010 census count of 47,512, which in turn reflected an increase of 756 (+1.6%) from the 46,756 counted in the 2000 census.

East Brunswick was incorporated as a township by an act of the New Jersey Legislature on February 28, 1860, from portions of both Monroe Township and North Brunswick. Portions of the township were taken to form Washington town within the township (February 23, 1870; became independent as South River on February 28, 1898), Helmetta (March 20, 1888), Milltown (January 29, 1889) and Spotswood (April 15, 1908).

Since the 2000 census, the United States Census Bureau calculated that New Jersey's center of population was located in the township.

== History ==
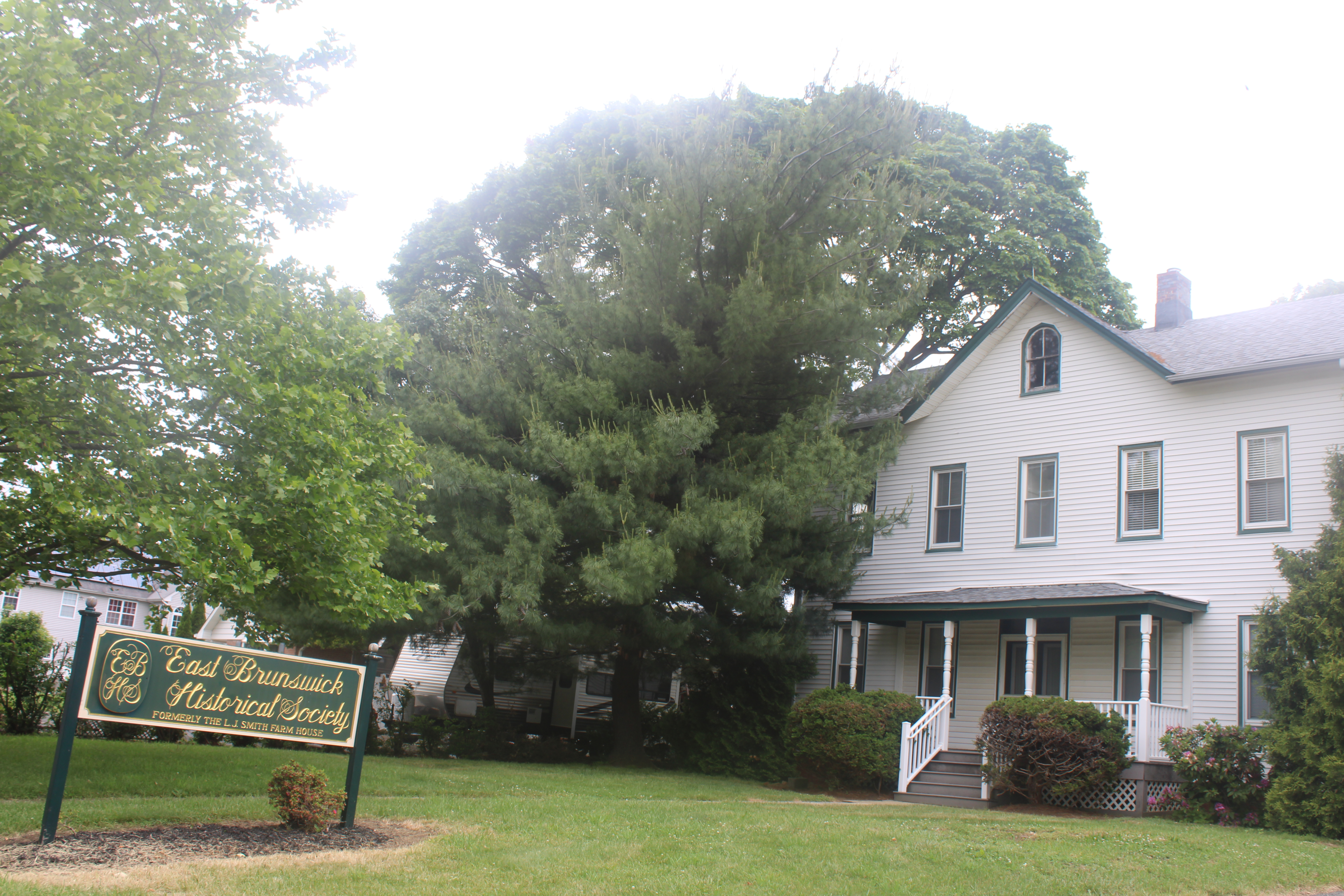
The L.J. Smith Farmhouse, now the headquarters for the East Brunswick Historical Society

The general area of central New Jersey was originally occupied by the Lenape Native Americans. According to a 1677 bill of sale now in the New Jersey State Museum in Trenton, New Jersey, Thomas Lawrence, a New York baker, purchased thousands of acres of land from local Native Americans named Querameck, Kesyacs, Isarick, Metapis, Peckawan, and Turantecas.

In this document, the area is called Piscopeek, which later become known as Lawrence Brook, after its purchaser. Around the late 17th century, settlers began arriving in the northern part of East Brunswick, and by the mid-19th century, a small settlement had formed in the southeastern part, known as the Old Bridge section of the town, an area that was placed on the National Register of Historic Places in 1977, the Old Bridge Historic District.

The area today known as East Brunswick was incorporated in 1860 from parts of North Brunswick and Monroe townships, including the community of Old Bridge. Originally a farming community, suburban settlement started in the 1930s with improved road access. Large scale housing and road construction, especially after World War II, transformed East Brunswick into a more suburban community. The extension of the New Jersey Turnpike to East Brunswick in 1952 led to a sharp spike in population growth, with the 1950 Census population of 5,699 more than tripling to 19,965 as of the 1960 enumeration.

In the early 1970s, a citizens group called Concerned Citizens of East Brunswick sued the New Jersey Turnpike Authority over a proposed major widening project. The citizens group effectively won the case, gaining concessions in turnpike design, scale and mitigation measures for noise and air quality. The citizens group presented technical data from their own experts and prevailed in what was one of the earliest technical confrontations regarding urban highway design related to environmental factors in U.S. history.

East Brunswick was also the site of the gunfight at Turnpike exit 9 shortly after midnight on May 2, 1973, in which a car being driven by Zayd Malik Shakur (born James F. Costan), with Assata Shakur (formerly JoAnne Chesimard) and Sundiata Acoli (born Clark Squire) as passengers, was stopped on the New Jersey Turnpike State Trooper James Harper, backed up by Trooper Werner Foerster in a second patrol vehicle. After Zayd Shakur was asked to step out of the car to address a discrepancy in his identification, a shootout ensued in which Trooper Foerster was shot twice in the head with his own gun and killed, Zayd Shakur was killed, and both Assata Shakur and Trooper Harper were wounded.

== Geography ==
According to the United States Census Bureau, the township had a total area of 22.36 square miles (57.91 km^{2}), including 21.78 square miles (56.42 km^{2}) of land and 0.57 square miles (1.48 km^{2}) of water (2.56%).

The township lies on exit 9 of the New Jersey Turnpike. Its Municipal Building, named for 1970s Mayor Jean Walling, is located 31 miles (50 km) southwest of New York City's Times Square and 49 miles (79 km) northeast of Center City, Philadelphia. It takes approximately 45–60 minutes to reach Midtown Manhattan in New York City or Center City, Philadelphia, depending on traffic and destination. Route 18 runs through the eastern part of the township, as it serves as a vital route in Central Jersey for access to the Jersey Shore and interior parts of the state. East Brunswick's pristine suburbs and its convenience to major highways for leisure and for work, have contributed to it being a popular place for New York City commuters.

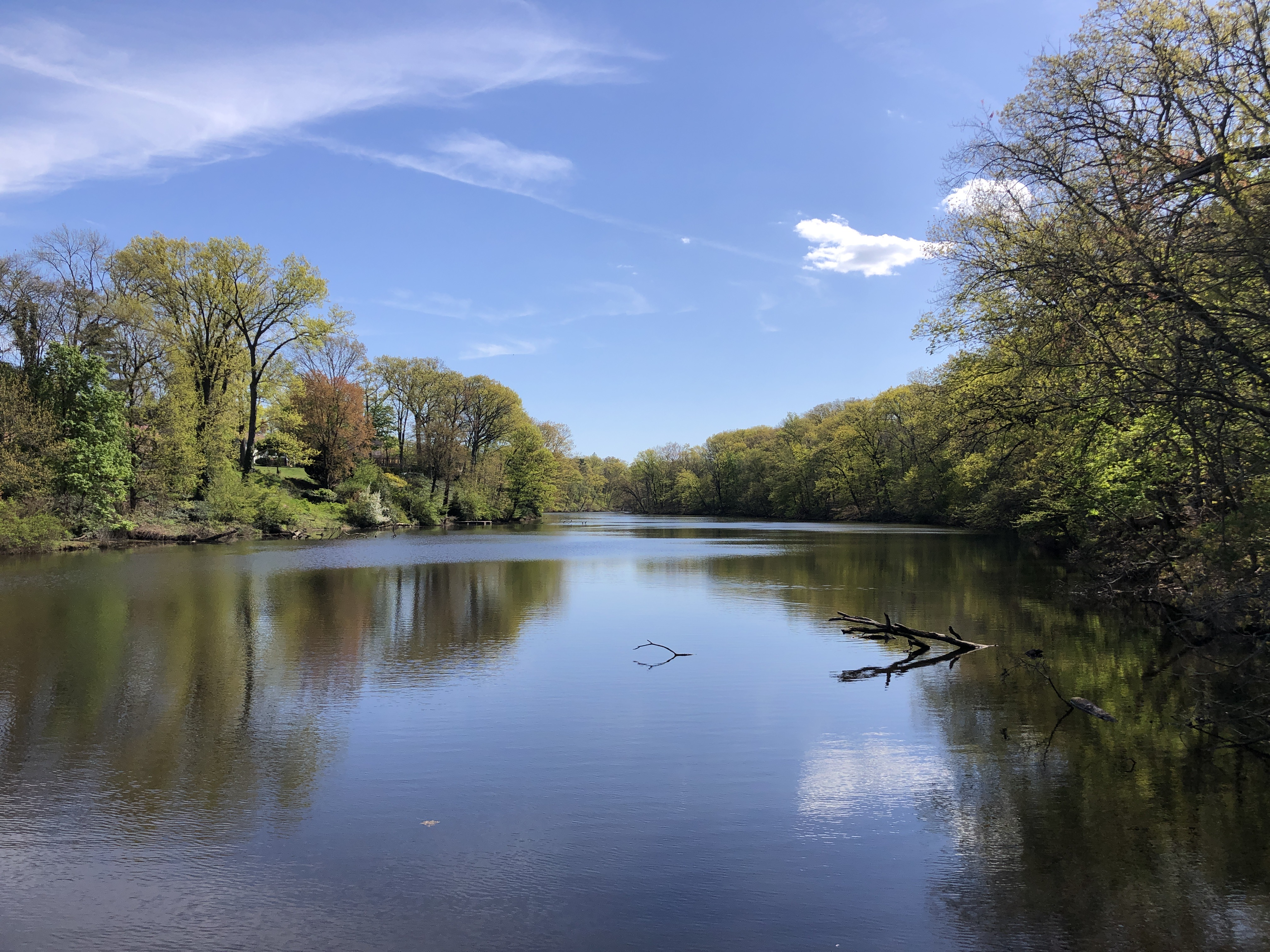
Westons Mill Pond, with Rutgers University on the right and East Brunswick on the left

East Brunswick is located in the heart of the Raritan Valley region, as the township is located right on the southern shore of the Raritan River. The Lawrence Brook, a major tributary of the Raritan River, runs along the western border of the township. Farrington Lake and Westons Mill Pond are sections of the Lawrence Brook that have been widened by the presence of man-made dams. The South River, another major tributary of the Raritan River, runs along the eastern border of the township near the historic village of Old Bridge. The Manalapan Brook's watershed (a tributary of the South River) encompasses much of the southern half of the township near Spotswood and Monroe, whereas the aforementioned Lawrence Brook's watershed encompasses much of the northern half of the township near Milltown and the other Brunswicks.

Unincorporated communities, localities and place names located partially or completely within the township include Brookview, Dunhams Corner, Fairview Knolls, Farrington Lake Heights, Gillilandtown, Halls Corner, Herberts, Herberts Corner, Herbertsville, Jamesburg Park,, Lawrence Brook, Lawrence Brook Manor, Newton Heights, Old Bridge, Orchard Heights, Patricks Corner, Paulas Corner, Tanners Corner, Washington Heights and Westons Mills., Country Lane

The township borders the Middlesex County municipalities of Edison, Helmetta, Milltown, Monroe Township, New Brunswick, North Brunswick, Old Bridge Township, Sayreville, South River, South Brunswick and Spotswood.

== Climate ==
East Brunswick sits at the border between a humid continental climate according to the 0-degree-Celsius isotherm and a humid subtropical climate.

Climate data for East Brunswick, 1981–2010
Month	Jan	Feb	Mar	Apr	May	Jun	Jul	Aug	Sep	Oct	Nov	Dec	Year
Record high °F (°C)	71 (22)	75 (24)	88 (31)	95 (35)	97 (36)	100 (38)	103 (39)	102 (39)	101 (38)	94 (34)	82 (28)	76 (24)	103 (39)
Mean daily maximum °F (°C)	38 (3)	41 (5)	50 (10)	61 (16)	72 (22)	80 (27)	85 (29)	84 (29)	77 (25)	65 (18)	54 (12)	43 (6)	63 (17)
Daily mean °F (°C)	30 (−1)	32 (0)	41 (5)	50 (10)	61 (16)	70 (21)	75 (24)	73 (23)	66 (19)	54 (12)	45 (7)	35 (2)	53 (12)
Mean daily minimum °F (°C)	21 (−6)	23 (−5)	31 (−1)	40 (4)	50 (10)	59 (15)	64 (18)	63 (17)	55 (13)	43 (6)	35 (2)	27 (−3)	43 (6)
Record low °F (°C)	−13 (−25)	−7 (−22)	6 (−14)	16 (−9)	30 (−1)	40 (4)	45 (7)	40 (4)	35 (2)	25 (−4)	13 (−11)	−7 (−22)	−13 (−25)
Average precipitation inches (mm)	4.10 (104)	2.98 (76)	4.11 (104)	4.08 (104)	4.57 (116)	3.86 (98)	4.97 (126)	4.46 (113)	4.38 (111)	3.39 (86)	3.95 (100)	3.93 (100)	48.78 (1,238)

== Demographics ==
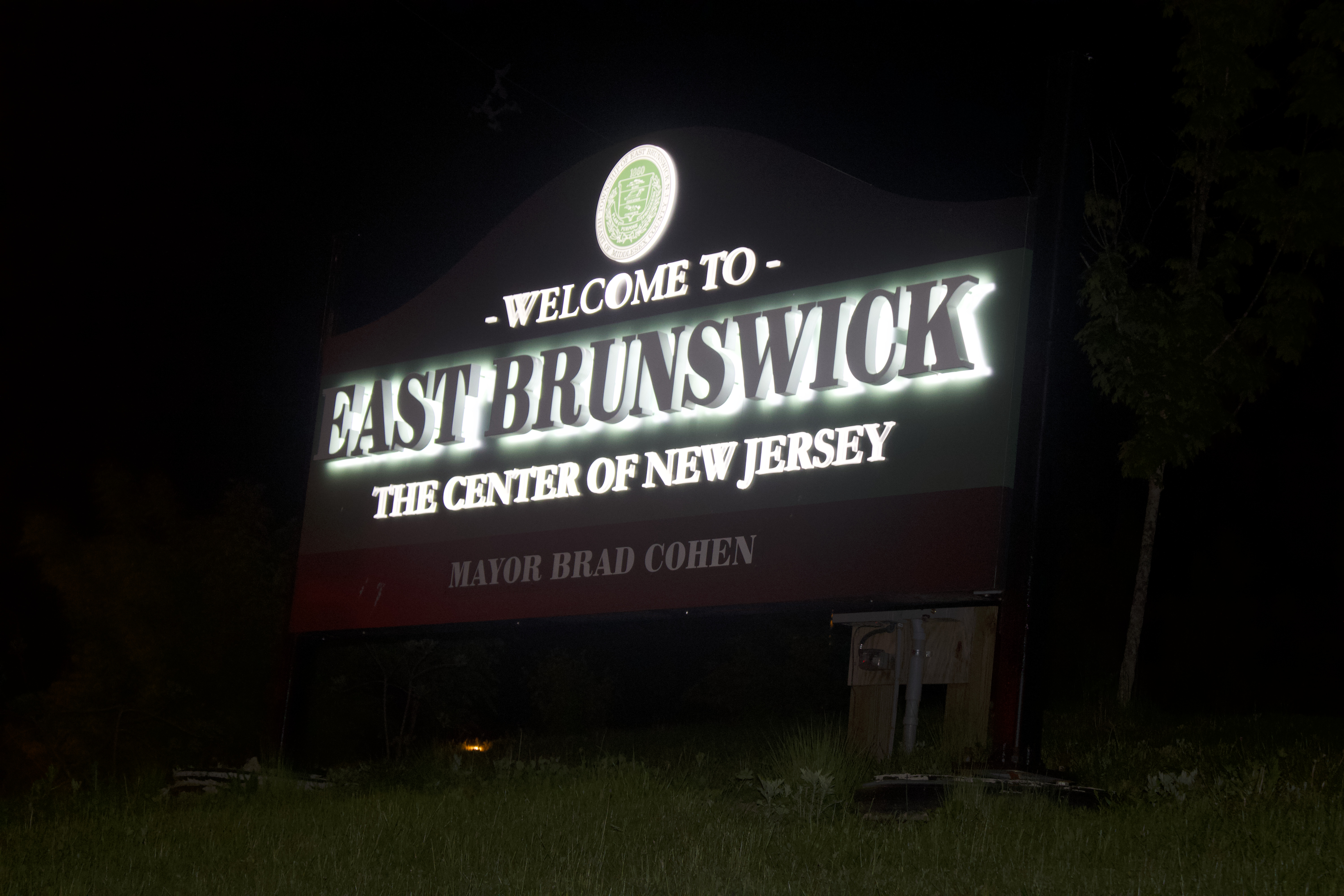
Illuminated sign entering into East Brunswick on Route 18

Historical population
Census	Pop.	Note	%±
1860	2,436		—
1870	2,861		17.4%
1880	3,272		14.4%
1890	2,642	*	−19.3%
1900	2,423	*	−8.3%
1910	1,602	*	−33.9%
1920	1,857		15.9%
1930	2,711		46.0%
1940	3,706		36.7%
1950	5,699		53.8%
1960	19,965		250.3%
1970	34,166		71.1%
1980	37,711		10.4%
1990	43,548		15.5%
2000	46,756		7.4%
2010	47,512		1.6%
2020	49,715		4.6%
2024 (est.)	51,086		2.8%
Population sources: 1860–1920; 1860–1870 1870 1880–1890; 1890–1910 1910–1930 1940–2000; 2000 2010 2020 * = Lost territory in previous decade.

=== 2010 census ===
The 2010 United States census counted 47,512 people, 16,810 households, and 13,179 families in the township. The population density was 2,189.6 per square mile (845.4/km^{2}). There were 17,367 housing units at an average density of 800.4 per square mile (309.0/km^{2}). The racial makeup was 69.36% (32,954) White, 3.98% (1,890) Black or African American, 0.10% (48) Native American, 22.80% (10,835) Asian, 0.01% (6) Pacific Islander, 1.68% (798) from other races, and 2.06% (981) from two or more races. Hispanic or Latino of any race were 6.70% (3,184) of the population.

Of the 16,810 households, 37.2% had children under the age of 18; 65.8% were married couples living together; 9.5% had a female householder with no husband present and 21.6% were non-families. Of all households, 19.0% were made up of individuals and 8.5% had someone living alone who was 65 years of age or older. The average household size was 2.81 and the average family size was 3.23.

24.1% of the population were under the age of 18, 7.3% from 18 to 24, 23.0% from 25 to 44, 32.1% from 45 to 64, and 13.5% who were 65 years of age or older. The median age was 42.5 years. For every 100 females, the population had 93.6 males. For every 100 females ages 18 and older there were 90.4 males.

The Census Bureau's 2006–2010 American Community Survey showed that (in 2010 inflation-adjusted dollars) median household income was $100,655 (with a margin of error of +/− $3,929) and the median family income was $110,948 (+/− $3,838). Males had a median income of $80,527 (+/− $3,109) versus $54,162 (+/− $2,066) for females. The per capita income for the township was $41,518 (+/− $1,366). About 3.0% of families and 3.4% of the population were below the poverty line, including 4.4% of those under age 18 and 6.4% of those age 65 or over.

=== 2000 census ===
As of the 2000 United States census, there were 46,756 people, 16,372 households, and 13,081 families residing in the township. The population density was 2,129.7/mi^{2} (822.4/km^{2}). There were 16,640 housing units at an average density of 758.0/mi^{2} (292.7/km^{2}). The racial makeup of the township was 77.56% White, 2.83% African American, 0.09% Native American, 16.27% Asian, 0.01% Pacific Islander, 1.12% from other races, and 2.12% from two or more races. 4.19% of the population were Hispanic or Latino of any race.

Of the 16,372 households, 40.5% included children under the age of 18, 68.6% were married couples living together, 8.5% had a female householder with no husband present, and 20.1% were non-families. 17.2% of all households were made up of individuals, and 7.0% had someone living alone who was 65 years of age or older. The average household size was 2.84 and the average family size was 3.23.

In the township the population was spread out, with 26.0% under the age of 18, 6.2% from 18 to 24, 29.3% from 25 to 44, 26.9% from 45 to 64, and 11.6% who were 65 years of age or older. The median age was 39 years. For every 100 females, there were 94.3 males. For every 100 females age 18 and over, there were 90.1 males.

The median income for a household in the township was $75,956, and the median income for a family was $86,863. Males had a median income of $60,790 versus $38,534 for females. The per capita income for the township was $33,286. 2.8% of the population and 2.1% of families were below the poverty line. Out of the total population, 3.1% of those under the age of 18 and 5.4% of those 65 and older were living below the poverty line.

Ancestries included Italian (15.0%), Irish (13.8%), Polish (11.5%), German (10.6%), Russian (7.8%), United States (4.2%).

== Economy ==
With easy access to major highways like Route 18 and the New Jersey Turnpike, East Brunswick's proximity to cities, such as New Brunswick, New York City, Newark and Philadelphia has contributed in the township being a longtime premier economic center in the Central New Jersey region.

=== Corporate, commerce, and hospitality ===
Opened in 1970, Brunswick Square Mall is a single-story regional shopping mall, located on the corner of Route 18 and Rues Lane. The mall is currently anchored by Macy's and JCPenney and it has a gross leasable area (GLA) of 769,041 sq ft (71,446.2 m^{2}). Outside of Brunswick Square, the township itself has many other shopping malls and plazas, mostly dotted on Route 18. There are some other notable shopping destinations near East Brunswick, including the Menlo Park Mall in Edison, Woodbridge Center in Woodbridge Township, the Freehold Raceway Mall in Freehold Township, and The Shoppes in Old Bridge Township.

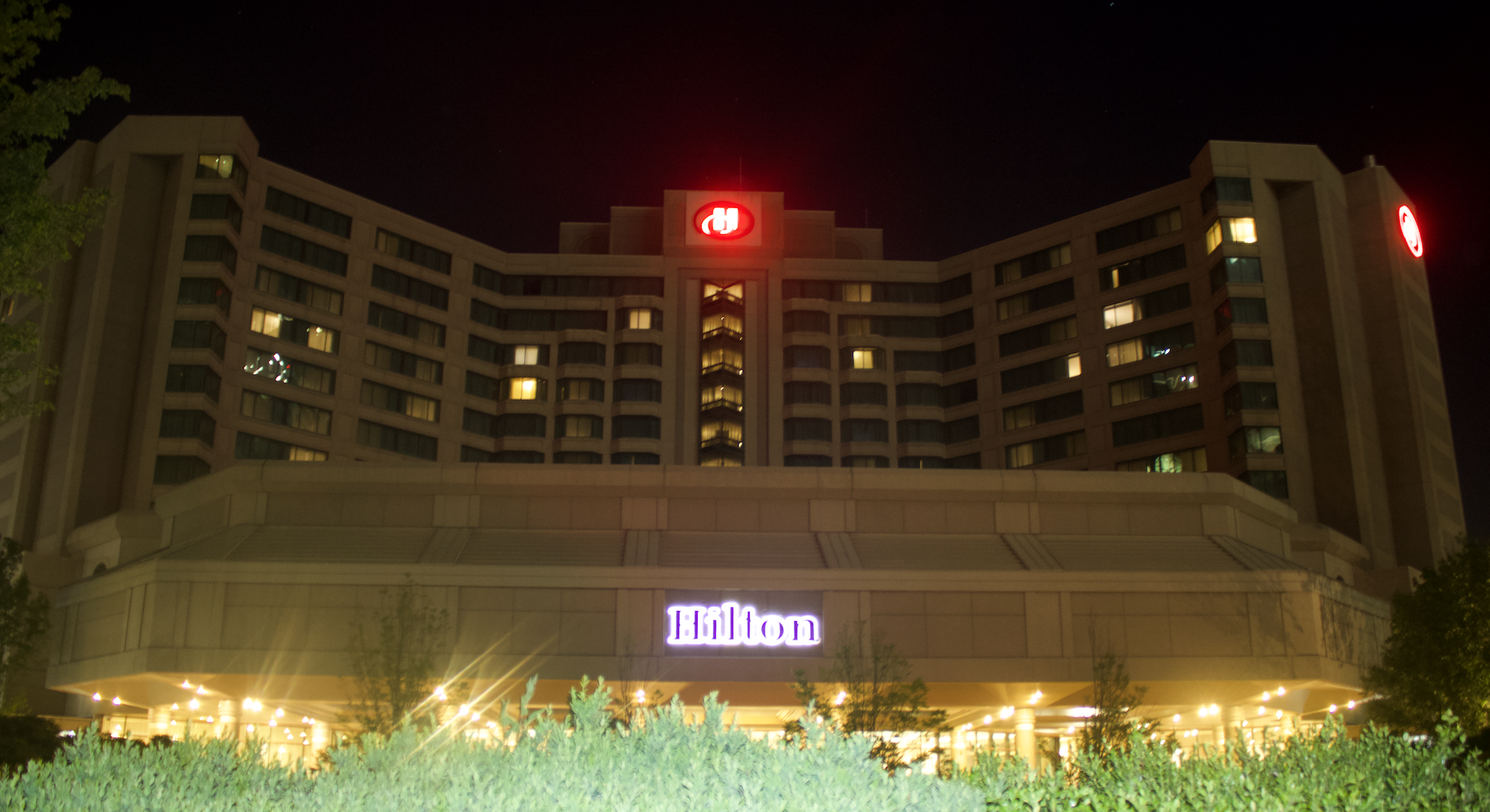
Grand Hilton Hotel at The Tower Center complex

The Tower Center complex includes two 23-story office towers, a 12-story Hilton Hotel, located near the intersection of the New Jersey Turnpike and Route 18. The two towers are among the tallest structures in Central Jersey, and can be seen for several miles. In March 2023, Bengaluru-based technology services and consulting company Wipro opened its American international headquarters in the Tower Center.

Giamarese Farm & Orchards is a family-owned business covering 35 acres (14 ha) and dating to 1941. It is a popular seasonal attraction for East Brunswick residents, located on Fresh Ponds Road in the southern section of the township.

== Arts and culture ==
East Brunswick is home of Playhouse 22, a volunteer-run community theater, housed at the Elliott Taubenslag Theater at the East Brunswick Community Arts Center.

Founded in 2019, the East Brunswick Arts Coalition supports arts and cultural organizations such as the East Brunswick Museum, East Brunswick Arts Commission, Playhouse 22, the East Brunswick Historical Society, the East Brunswick Symphony Orchestra and the East Brunswick Human Relations Council. Harvest Fest is an annual outdoor festival hosted by the East Brunswick Arts Coalition and located in the township's beautiful historic district. The festival typically showcases food vendors, art and craft vendors, a beer garden, live music, and more.

Musical groups from East Brunswick include ska punk group Catch 22, heavy metal quintet God Forbid and ska punk band Streetlight Manifesto.

In July 2021, the film Shiv Shastri Balboa starring Anupam Kher and Neena Gupta was filmed in East Brunswick.

In August 2025, East Brunswick received its "Film Ready" certification from the New Jersey Motion Picture and Television Commission making it one 19 municipalities in the state with such designation. This certification will allow the township to attract studios and networks looking for their next production site.

== Parks and recreation ==
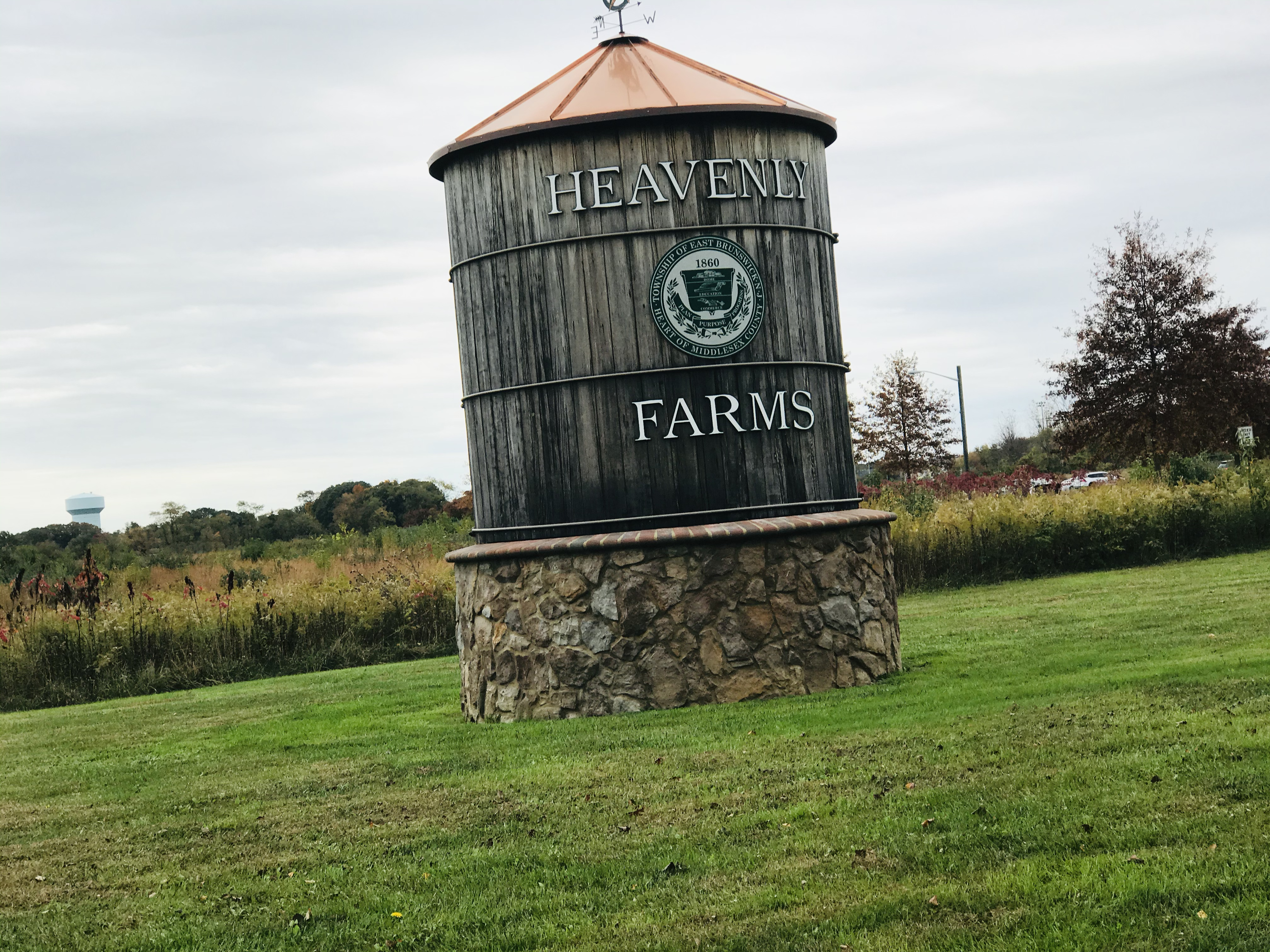
Watertower-like sign near the entrance of Heavenly Farms

While there are no major county or state parks within East Brunswick's borders, there is an assortment of recreational activities in the township.

On the border of East Brunswick and South Brunswick is the Ireland Brook Conservation area, a 22,651,200 sq ft (2,104,370 m^{2}) nature preserve of forests, fields, nature trails, and wetlands, near the Ireland Brook (a tributary of the Lawrence Brook within the much larger Raritan Valley region).

Heavenly Farms is the largest park operated by the township's division of recreation. It features baseball and softball fields, bike trails, a disc golf course, a dog park, football fields, lacrosse fields and lighted soccer fields.

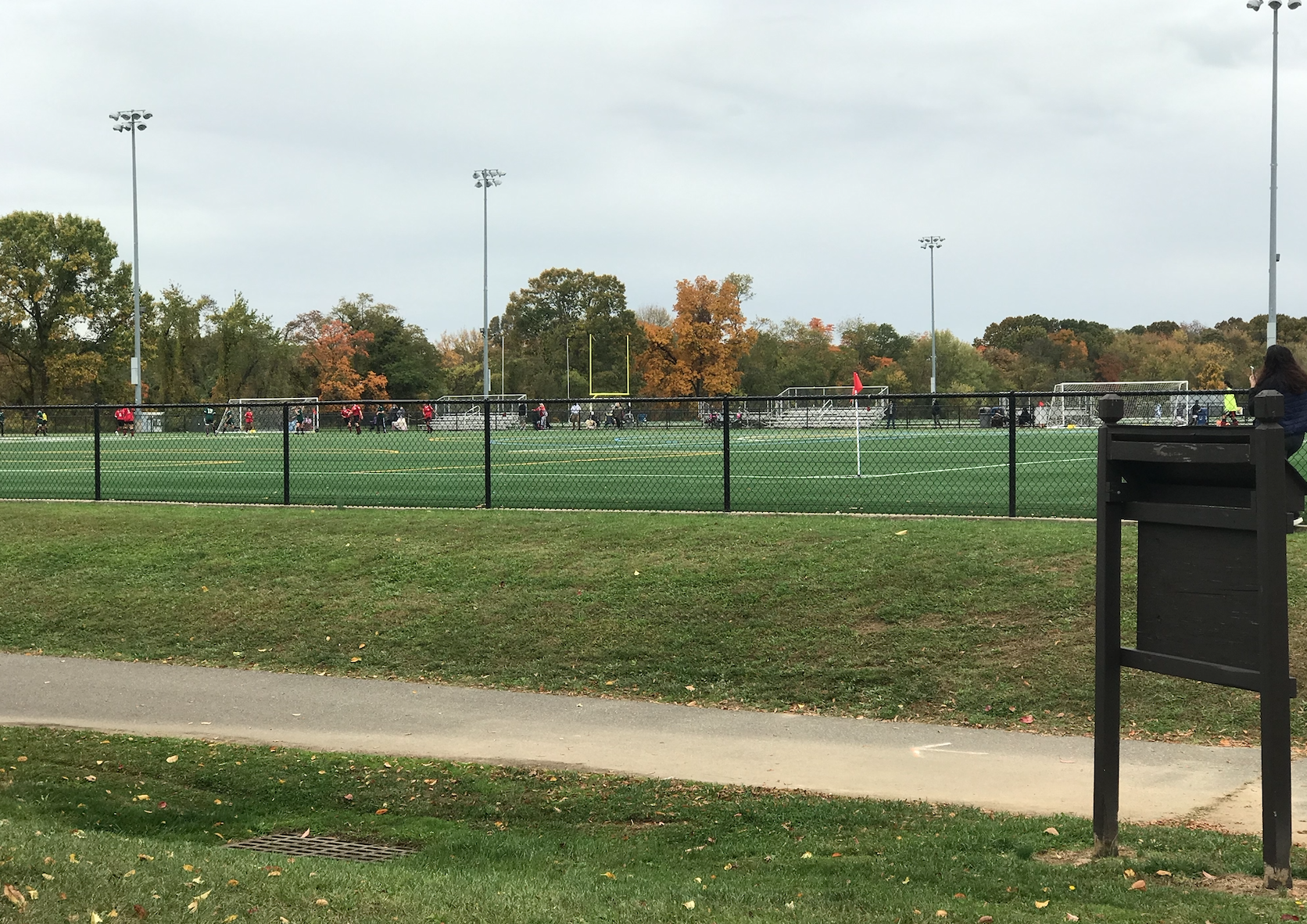
Youth of East Brunswick playing soccer

Crystal Springs Family Waterpark is an aquatic center that hosts five various size pools, a splash park, water slides, a lazy river, and more recreational activities. The park opened in 1994 and was the first municipal waterpark in New Jersey. The park was built on the site of parts of Dallenbach Lake.

Smaller parks in the township include the township's Community Park, along with Bicentennial Park, Country Lane Park, Crandall Play Area, Dideriksen Park, Frost Woods, Great Oak Park, Keystone Park, Lenape Park, Pine Ridge Park, Riva Avenue Park, Sadowski Play Area, Tices Lane Park, Volunteer and Veterans Park, Washington Heights Park, and Welsh Park.

== Law and government ==
=== Local government ===
The Township of East Brunswick was established in 1860. Since January 1, 1965, the Township has operated within the Faulkner Act under the Mayor-Council Plan E form of municipal government, which is used in 71 municipalities (of the 564) statewide. The governing body is comprised of the Mayor and the five-member Township Council, with all members elected at-large as part of the November general election in even-numbered years. The mayor and two council seats are up for vote together during Presidential election years, with the other seats up for vote two years later. Serving on a part-time basis as the chief executive of the community, the Mayor votes only in the case of a tie on a vote by the Township Council and can veto ordinances, but vetoes can be overridden by a two-thirds vote of the council. The Township Council adopts ordinances; adopts a budget after review and revisions; makes appropriations; sets taxes and bond issues; creates and abolishes jobs via ordinance; sets salaries and establishes municipal policy. The council has the authority to initiate hearings for the purposes of gathering information for ordinance making, airing public problems and supervising the spending of its appropriations.

As of 2026, the mayor of East Brunswick is Democrat Brad J. Cohen, whose term of office ends December 31, 2028. Members of the Township Council are Council President Dana Zimbicki (D, 2028), Council Vice President Dinesh Behal (D, 2028), Kevin McEvoy (D, 2026), James Wendell (D, 2026) and Dana Winston (D, 2026).

Dana Zimbicki was appointed in February 2022 to fill the seat expiring in December 2024 that was vacated the previous month by Michael Spadafino. Zimbicki served on an interim basis until the November 2022 election, when voters chose her to serve the remainder of the term of office.

In February 2021, the Township Council appointed Dinesh Behal from a list of three candidates submitted by the Democratic municipal committee to fill the seat expiring in December 2024 that had been held by Sterley Stanley until he resigned from office the previous month to take office in the New Jersey General Assembly; Behal served on an interim basis until the November 2021 general election, when he was elected to serve the balance of the term of office.

Elected as a Republican, James Wendell announced in July 2017 that he was switching parties, giving Democrats control of the Township Council.

In February 2014, the Township Council appointed Michael Spadafino to fill the seat expiring in December 2016 that had been held by Nancy Pinkin, until she stepped down the previous month to take office in the New Jersey General Assembly. In the November 2014 general election, Spadafino was elected to serve the balance of the term of office.

David Stahl served as mayor from his election in 2012 until his resignation on January 14, 2016, when he left office to take on a judge position in nearby Woodbridge Township. The Township Council appointed Kevin McEvoy, a former history teacher at East Brunswick High School and trustee of the East Brunswick Public Schools, to serve the balance of Stahl's term as mayor that expired in December 2016; McEvoy stated that he would not run to serve a full term as mayor.

Republicans took control of the Township Council for the first time in 14 years in 2010, as Camille Ferraro, Mike Hughes and James Wendell swept the three seats that were up for election, with voter sentiment focused on controversy over a redevelopment plan for a parcel of land known as the "Golden Triangle". Hughes, the youngest council member ever elected, said the stalled project was keeping property taxes disproportionately high on residents and called for revitalization of business.

=== Federal, state and county representation ===
East Brunswick Township is located in the 12th Congressional District and is part of New Jersey's 18th state legislative district.

For the 119th United States Congress, New Jersey's 12th congressional district is represented by Bonnie Watson Coleman (D, Ewing Township). New Jersey is represented in the United States Senate by Democrats Cory Booker (Newark, term ends 2027) and Andy Kim (Moorestown, term ends 2031).

For the 2026–2027 session, the 18th legislative district of the New Jersey Legislature is represented in the State Senate by Patrick J. Diegnan (D, South Plainfield) and in the General Assembly by Robert Karabinchak (D, Edison) and Sterley Stanley (D, East Brunswick).

Middlesex County is governed by a Board of County Commissioners, whose seven members are elected at-large on a partisan basis to serve three-year terms of office on a staggered basis, with either two or three seats coming up for election each year as part of the November general election. At an annual reorganization meeting held in January, the board selects from among its members a commissioner director and deputy director. As of 2025, Middlesex County's Commissioners (with party affiliation, term-end year, and residence listed in parentheses) are:

Director Ronald G. Rios (D, Carteret, 2027), Deputy Director Shanti Narra (D, North Brunswick, 2027), Claribel A. "Clary" Azcona-Barber (D, New Brunswick, 2025), Charles Kenny (D, Woodbridge Township, 2025), Leslie Koppel (D, Monroe Township, 2026), Chanelle Scott McCullum (D, Piscataway, 2025) and Charles E. Tomaro (D, Edison, 2026).

Constitutional officers are: Clerk Nancy Pinkin (D, 2025, East Brunswick), Sheriff Mildred S. Scott (D, 2025, Piscataway) and Surrogate Claribel Cortes (D, 2026; North Brunswick).

=== Politics ===
As of March 23, 2011, there were a total of 31,297 registered voters in East Brunswick Township, of which 9,957 (31.8%) were registered as Democrats, 5,298 (16.9%) were registered as Republicans and 16,024 (51.2%) were registered as Unaffiliated. There were 18 voters registered to other parties.

United States presidential election results for East Brunswick
Year	Republican		Democratic		Third party(ies)	
Year	No.	%	No.	%	No.	%
2024	11,555	45.34%	13,051	51.20%	882	3.46%
2020	10,713	39.97%	15,713	58.62%	377	1.41%
2016	9,255	40.99%	12,545	55.56%	779	3.45%
2012	9,064	42.78%	11,848	55.92%	275	1.30%
2008	9,967	43.29%	12,817	55.67%	238	1.03%
2004	10,069	45.26%	12,016	54.01%	163	0.73%
2000	7,129	36.55%	11,680	59.89%	695	3.56%

In the 2012 presidential election, Democrat Barack Obama received 55.9% of the vote (11,848 cast), ahead of Republican Mitt Romney with 42.8% (9,064 votes), and other candidates with 1.3% (275 votes), among the 21,332 ballots cast by the township's 31,870 registered voters (145 ballots were spoiled), for a turnout of 66.9%. In the 2008 presidential election, Democrat Barack Obama received 55.3% of the vote (12,817 cast), ahead of Republican John McCain with 43.0% (9,967 votes) and other candidates with 1.0% (238 votes), among the 23,187 ballots cast by the township's 32,144 registered voters, for a turnout of 72.1%. In the 2004 presidential election, Democrat John Kerry received 53.8% of the vote (12,016 ballots cast), outpolling Republican George W. Bush with 45.1% (10,069 votes) and other candidates with 0.5% (163 votes), among the 22,348 ballots cast by the township's 30,364 registered voters, for a turnout percentage of 73.6.

Gubernatorial election results for East Brunswick
Year	Republican		Democratic		Third party(ies)	
Year	No.	%	No.	%	No.	%
2025	8,052	41.00%	11,462	58.37%	124	0.63%
2021	7,098	45.33%	8,417	53.76%	143	0.91%
2017	5,137	42.77%	6,532	54.39%	341	2.84%
2013	7,849	62.28%	4,589	36.41%	164	1.30%
2009	7,805	52.95%	5,799	39.34%	1,135	7.70%
2005	5,958	43.80%	7,109	52.26%	535	3.93%

In the 2013 gubernatorial election, Republican Chris Christie received 62.3% of the vote (7,849 cast), ahead of Democrat Barbara Buono with 36.4% (4,589 votes), and other candidates with 1.3% (164 votes), among the 12,731 ballots cast by the township's 31,870 registered voters (129 ballots were spoiled), for a turnout of 39.9%. In the 2009 gubernatorial election, Republican Chris Christie received 52.7% of the vote (7,805 ballots cast), ahead of Democrat Jon Corzine with 39.1% (5,799 votes), Independent Chris Daggett with 6.8% (1,007 votes) and other candidates with 0.9% (128 votes), among the 14,824 ballots cast by the township's 31,116 registered voters, yielding a 47.6% turnout.

United States Senate election results for East Brunswick1
Year	Republican		Democratic		Third party(ies)	
Year	No.	%	No.	%	No.	%
2024	10,377	42.50%	12,992	53.21%	1,048	4.29%
2018	7,886	42.62%	10,055	54.35%	561	3.03%
2012	8,407	41.85%	11,365	56.57%	318	1.58%
2006	5,918	43.07%	7,485	54.48%	336	2.45%

United States Senate election results for East Brunswick2
Year	Republican		Democratic		Third party(ies)	
Year	No.	%	No.	%	No.	%
2020	10,575	40.19%	15,152	57.59%	583	2.22%
2014	4,600	43.49%	5,848	55.29%	129	1.22%
2013	3,404	43.25%	4,383	55.69%	83	1.05%
2008	9,584	44.44%	11,610	53.84%	370	1.72%

== Education ==
The East Brunswick Public Schools serve students in pre-kindergarten through twelfth grade. As of the 2024–25 school year, the district, comprised of 11 schools, had an enrollment of 8,163 students and 724.4 classroom teachers (on an FTE basis), for a student–teacher ratio of 11.3:1. Schools in the district (with 2024-25 enrollment data from the National Center for Education Statistics) are Bowne-Munro Elementary School (with 201 students; in grades PreK–4), Central Elementary School (349; PreK–4), Murray A. Chittick Elementary School (338; PreK–4), Robert Frost Elementary School (383; PreK–4), Irwin Elementary School (305; PreK–4), Lawrence Brook Elementary School (362; PreK–4), Memorial Elementary School (408; K–4), Warnsdorfer Elementary School (325; K–4), Hammarskjold Upper Elementary School (1,221; 5–6), Churchill Junior High School (2,080; 7–9) and East Brunswick High School (2,124; 10–12).

Eighth grade students from all of Middlesex County are eligible to apply to attend the high school programs offered by the Middlesex County Magnet Schools, a county-wide vocational school district that offers full-time career and technical education at its schools in East Brunswick, Edison, Perth Amboy, Piscataway and Woodbridge Township, with no tuition charged to students for attendance.

Hatikvah International Academy Charter School, a Hebrew language charter school that offers an International Baccalaureate program opened in September 2010 for grades K–7, with plans to add a new grade each year until an eighth grade is offered. A lottery is held each year, with separate draws for residents of East Brunswick Township and non-residents, to allocate the limited number of positions available for each class. The school plans to build a permanent structure as part of the Campus for Jewish Life (formerly known as the YM-YWHA of Raritan Valley) to replace its current facility the school has rented located near Trinity Presbyterian Church. Concerns have been raised regarding the funding for the school, which will come from the East Brunswick Board of Education budget, including $1.34 million for the 2010–2011 school year, and that the district will not be able to reduce expenses by the amount that will be paid to the charter school. Hatikvah school officials emphasize that charter schools can often educate students at a lower cost than traditional public schools and that "taxpayers do not pay an extra penny for having a charter school in town, period". The school received $75,000 in grants from foundations to cover the costs of applying for a charter and for getting the school operational. Hatikvah budgeted $11,033 per student for the 2010–2011 school year, while the East Brunswick Public Schools budgeted $12,782 per pupil for that same year. As of the 2021–22 school year, the school had an enrollment of 573 students and 44.2 classroom teachers (on an FTE basis), for a student–teacher ratio of 13.0:1.

Solomon Schechter Day School of Raritan Valley, a Conservative Jewish day school, closed its doors before the start of the 2013–2014 school year in the wake of sharply lower enrollment and financial difficulties. During the 2009–2010 school year, the school was awarded the Blue Ribbon School Award of Excellence by the United States Department of Education, the highest award an American school can receive.

Saint Bartholomew's School is a Catholic elementary school serving 372 students in Pre-K through eighth grade as of the 2019–2020 school year. The school operates under the supervision of the Roman Catholic Diocese of Metuchen.

== Historic district ==
The Old Bridge Village Historic District is a 108-acre (44 ha) historic district located along the South River in the southern portion of the township. It was added to the National Register of Historic Places on June 29, 1977, for its significance in art, education, and industry. The district includes 78 contributing buildings.

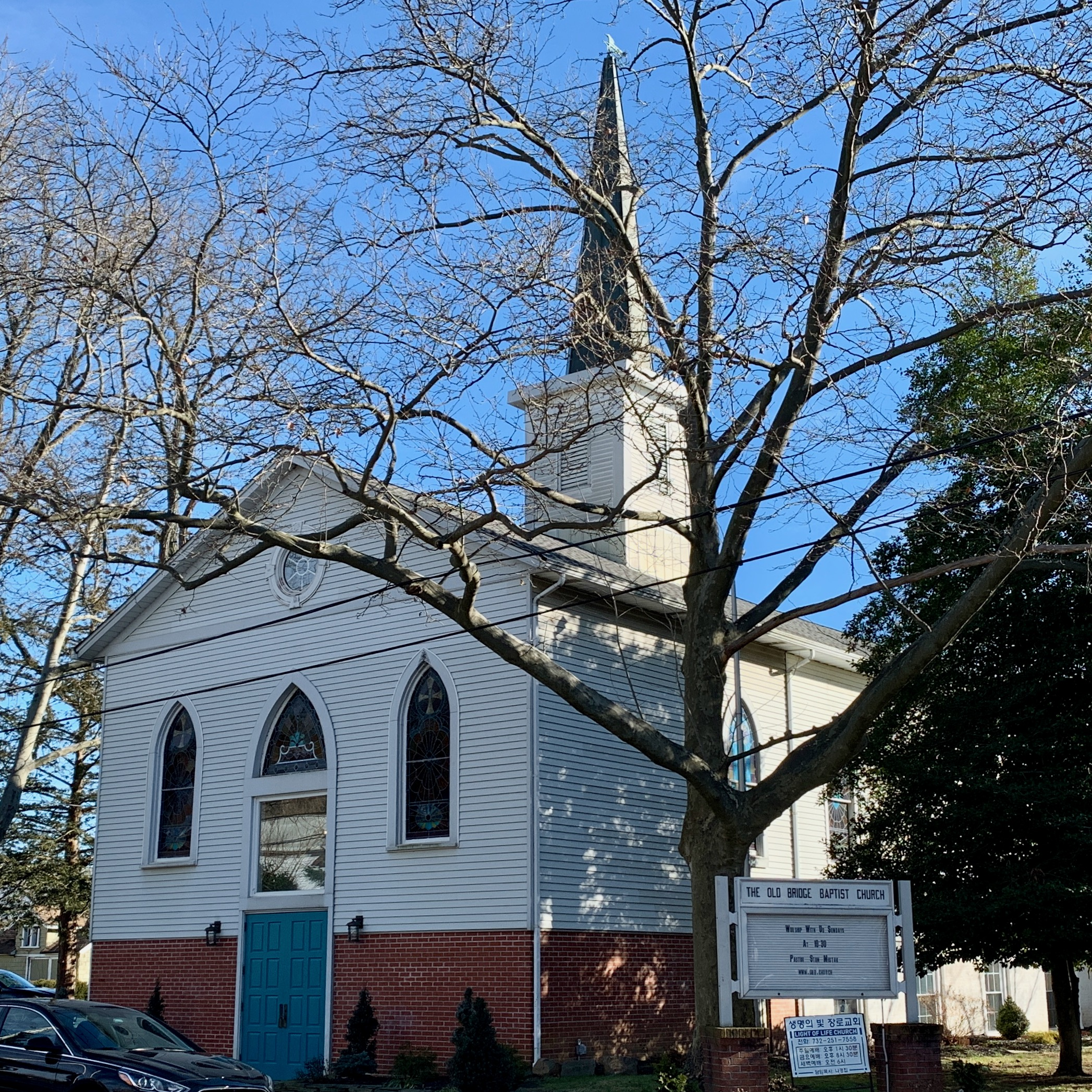
Old Bridge Baptist Church

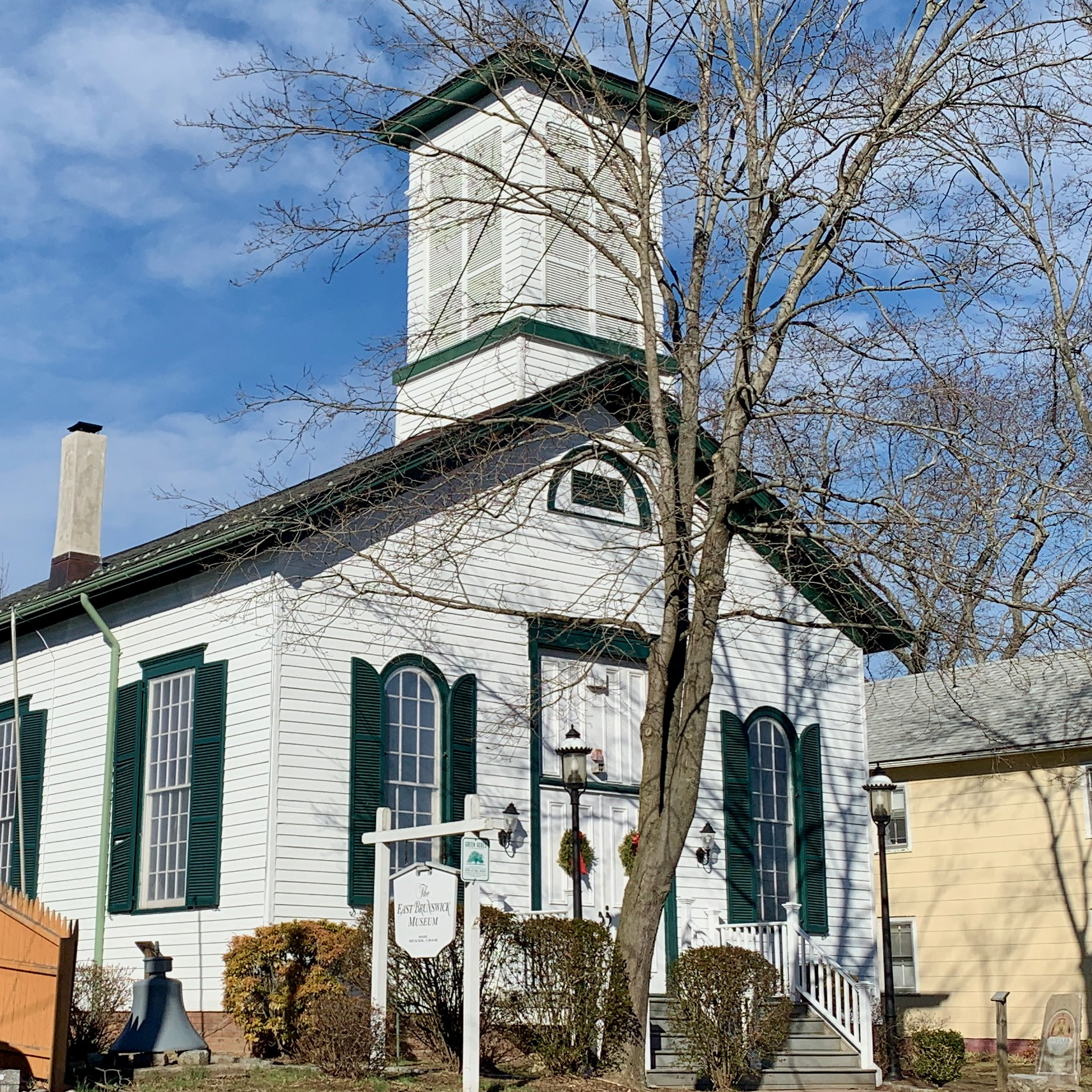
Simpson Methodist Episcopal Church

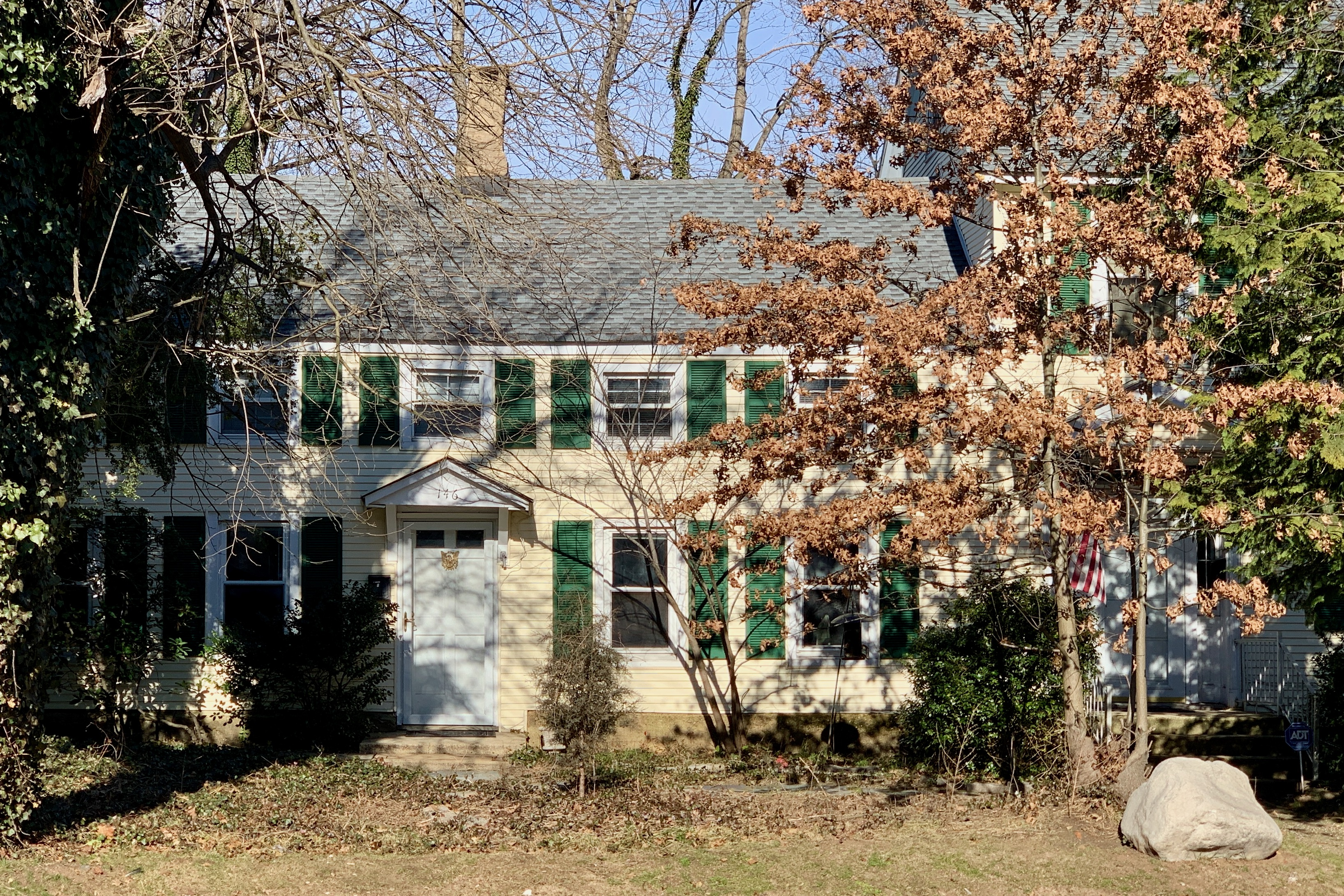
General Obadiah Herbert House

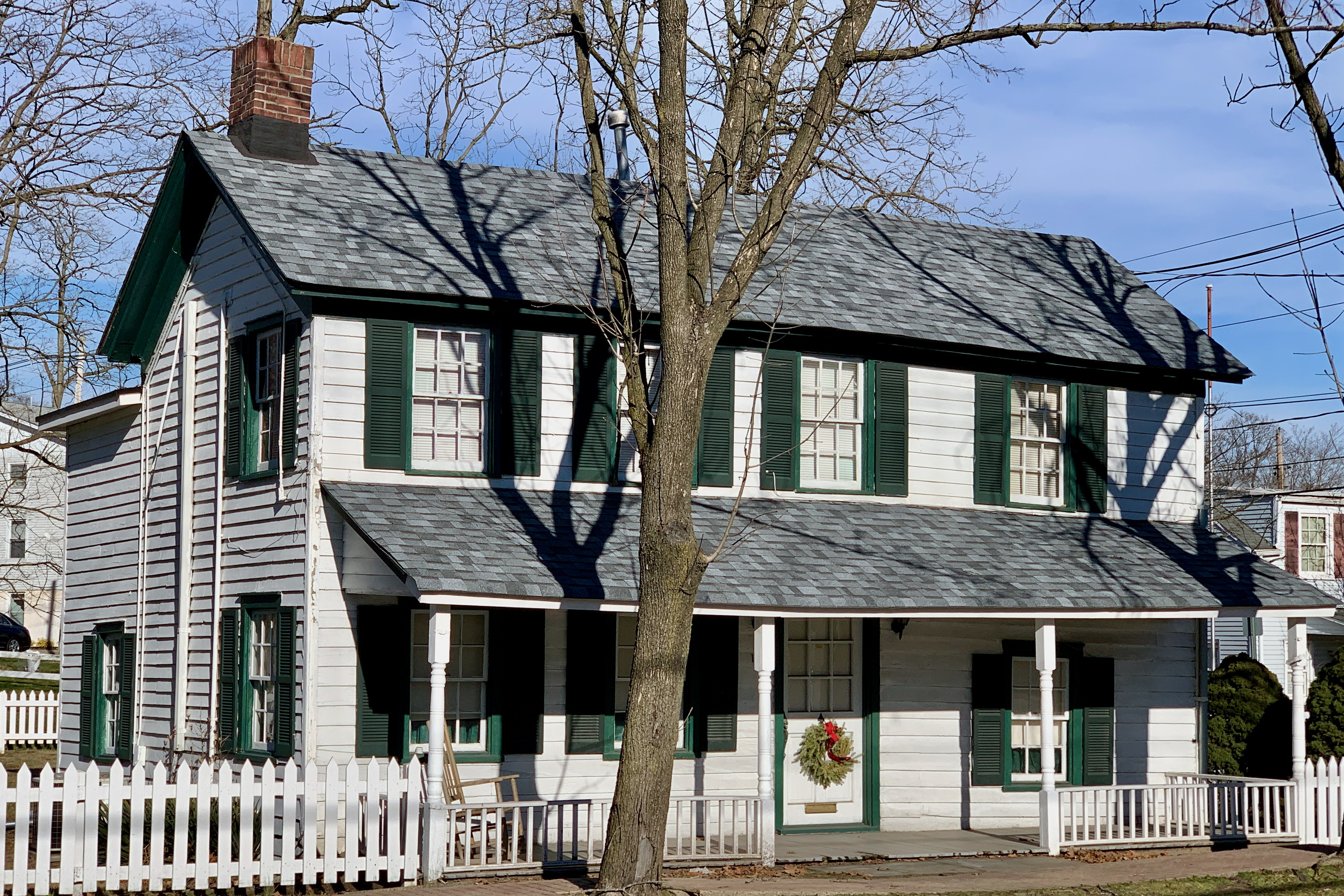
Alice Appleby Devoe Memorial Library

== Transportation ==
=== Roads and highways ===
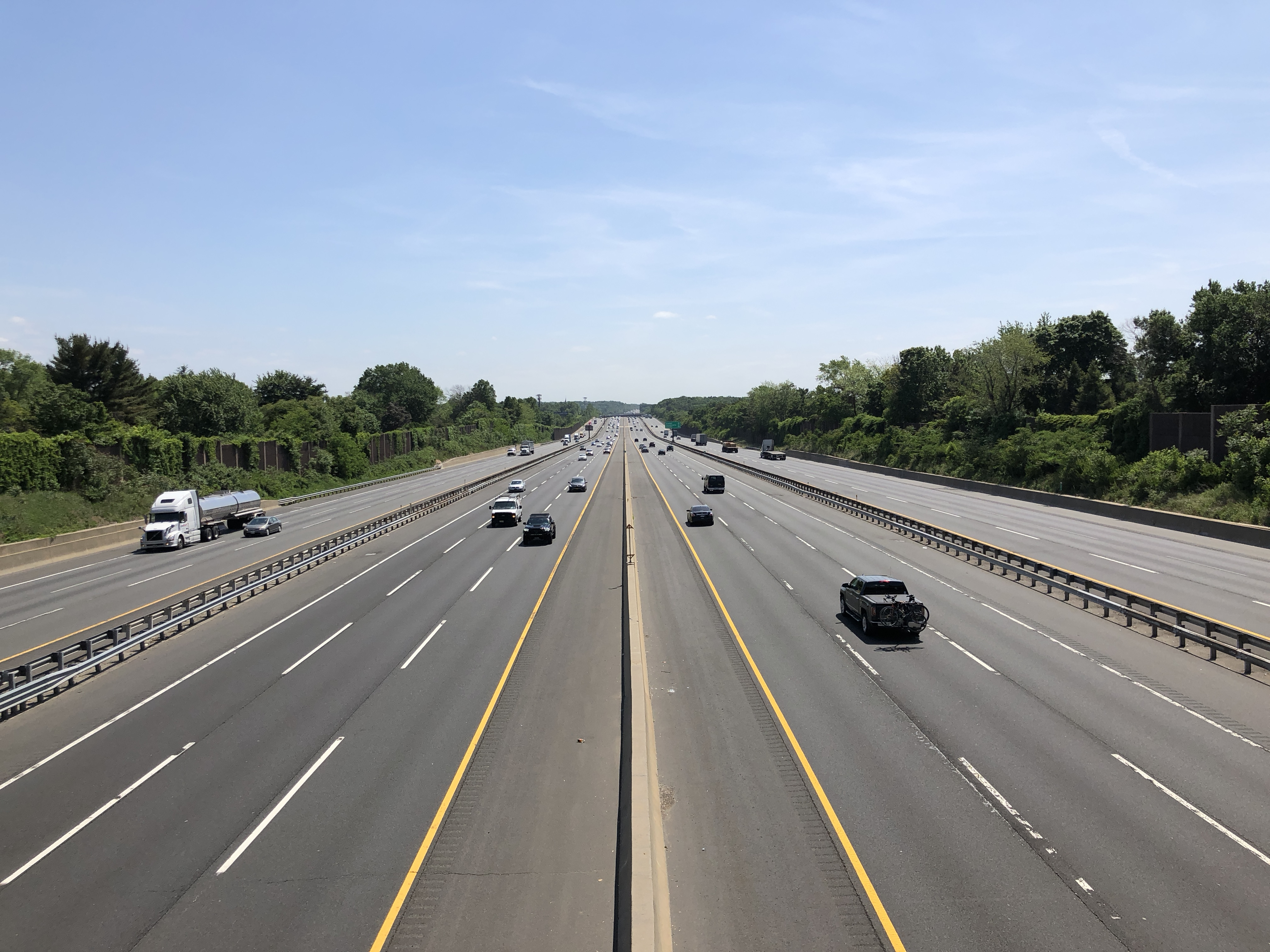
View south along the New Jersey Turnpike (I-95) just south of Exit 9 in East Brunswick

As of May 2010, the township had a total of 205.94 miles (331.43 km) of roadways, of which 176.11 miles (283.42 km) were maintained by the municipality, 19.65 miles (31.62 km) by Middlesex County, 5.48 miles (8.82 km) by the New Jersey Department of Transportation and 4.70 miles (7.56 km) by the New Jersey Turnpike Authority. The township is served by several major roads and highways.

The New Jersey Turnpike (Interstate 95) passes through East Brunswick. The Turnpike's Joyce Kilmer service area is located between interchanges 8A and 9 northbound at milepost 78.7. Route 18 connects with the turnpike in East Brunswick and provides connections to New Brunswick, U.S. Route 1 and the Jersey Shore. Major county roads that pass through include CR 527 and CR 535. Other limited access roads are accessible outside the township, such as the Garden State Parkway in neighboring Sayreville and Old Bridge, and Interstate 287 in neighboring Edison.

The Turnpike's "dual-dual" configuration (car-only and truck lanes) was extended from exit 10 in Edison to just south of exit 9 in 1973, then to exit 8A in 1990, and finally to exit 6 in 2014.

=== Public transportation ===
NJ Transit bus service is provided on the 138 route to the Port Authority Bus Terminal in New York City, on the 68 to Jersey City, and on the 811, 815 and 818 local routes.

The MCAT shuttle system provides local service on the M2 route serving Brunswick Square, Monroe Township and Jamesburg the M3 route, which operates between Brunswick Square and Old Bridge Township and the M7 route between Brunswick Square Mall and South Amboy.

Suburban Transit operates bus routes to New York City every 10–15 minutes from both the Transportation Center and Tower Center; it takes about 30–50 minutes depending on traffic. Service to the Port Authority Bus Terminal is available on Line 100 from Princeton and on Line 400 from the Transportation Center, to 59th Street and Madison Avenue on Line 300, to the United Nations on Line 500, and to Wall Street on Line 600.

Dating back to 1888, the Raritan River Railroad is a shortline railroad that stretched 12.6 miles (20.3 km) through Middlesex County. Passenger service ended in 1938 and the line, now much-reduced in length and part of Conrail, provides freight service through the township, where two businesses still receive weekly freight shipments of plastic. There have been proposals to turn the line into a light rail corridor.

Old Bridge Airport in Old Bridge Township supply short-distance flights to surrounding areas and are the closest air transportation services. The closest major airport is Newark Liberty International Airport in Newark / Elizabeth, via the New Jersey Turnpike, which is 24 miles (39 km) (about 37 minutes drive) from the center of East Brunswick. John F. Kennedy International Airport in Queens is roughly 36 miles (58 km) away, traveling via the Belt Parkway after crossing through Staten Island. LaGuardia Airport is roughly 37 miles (60 km) away.

== Points of interest ==
- Playhouse 22, East Brunswick's Community Theatre and Performing Arts Center, resides in the multi-purpose Community Arts Center at Heavenly Farms Park. Recognized in 2000 as Community Theatre of the Year in New Jersey, Playhouse 22 has staged many hit musicals, dramas, comedies and original works.
- Farrington Lake and Westons Mill Pond, two segments of Lawrence Brook, are available to canoeists, kayakers and nature lovers.
- The township has Tamarack Golf Course, a public golf course operated by the Middlesex County Improvement Authority.
- The Middlesex County Fair Grounds is the site of the week-long Middlesex County Fair held every August, providing festivities and food for families throughout Central Jersey and surrounding regions. First held in 1938, the Fair moved to its current site located on Cranbury Road (County Route 535) in 1965.
- The East Brunswick Museum, formerly the Simpson Methodist Episcopal Church, in the community of Old Bridge features the works of local artist James Crawford Thom.

== Notable people ==
People who were born in, residents of, or otherwise closely associated with East Brunswick include:

- T. Frank Appleby (1864–1924), represented New Jersey's 3rd congressional district in the United States House of Representatives from 1921 to 1923
- Robert Asaro-Angelo, labor leader and Commissioner of the New Jersey Department of Labor and Workforce Development
- Michael Barkann (born 1960), sports host, anchor and reporter for NBC Sports Philadelphia
- Amir Bell (born 1996), basketball player for Hapoel Be'er Sheva B.C. of the Israel Basketball Premier League
- James Bornheimer (1933–1993), politician who served in the New Jersey General Assembly from 1972 to 1982 and in the New Jersey Senate from 1982 to 1984
- George Brasno (1911–1982) and Olive Brasno (1917–1998), vaudevillian performers known for their roles in the Our Gang comedies and Charlie Chan movie series, who turned down an offer to appear as Munchkins in The Wizard of Oz
- Jeanie Bryson (born 1958), singer
- Chris Cimino (born 1969), WNBC weatherman
- Wally Dallenbach Sr. (1936–2024), professional car racer
- Steve Dildarian (born 1969), creator, writer, producer, and the voice of HBO's The Life & Times of Tim
- Marc Ecko (born 1972), clothing designer
- Hallie Eisenberg (born 1992), actress, sister of Jesse Eisenberg
- Jesse Eisenberg (born 1983), actor who has starred in The Squid and the Whale, Zombieland, Adventureland, The Social Network and Batman v Superman: Dawn of Justice
- Bryan Fortay (born 1971), former football quarterback who played for the Frankfurt Galaxy and the Miami Hooters
- Skott Freedman (born 1979), award-winning independent singer/songwriter
- Irving Freese (born 1903), mayor of Norwalk, Connecticut, and the third Socialist mayor elected in the United States
- Margaret Kemble Gage (1734–1824), who allegedly spied on her husband General Thomas Gage in order to supply military intelligence to the American Revolutionary Army
- Scott Gottlieb (born 1972), physician and investor who served as the 23rd commissioner of the Food and Drug Administration (FDA) from 2017 until April 2019
- Peter I. Haskell, broadcaster on WCBS 880 radio
- Dulé Hill (born 1975), actor who has appeared on The West Wing and the USA Network series Psych
- Sabah Homasi (born 1988), mixed martial artist who competes in the welterweight division
- Ghilene Joseph (born 1997), footballer who plays as a midfielder / forward for the Guyana women's national team
- Tomas Kalnoky (born 1980), singer and guitarist of Streetlight Manifesto and formerly Catch 22
- Mindy Kleinberg, one of the "Jersey Widows" who were vocal in demanding an official investigation into the intelligence failures which led to the September 11 terrorist attacks
- Mr. Lawrence (born 1969), voice actor and comedian, best known for voicing the SpongeBob SquarePants character Plankton
- Sam Mattis (born 1994), Olympic track and field athlete who competes in the discus throw
- Coleman Mellett (1974–2009), jazz guitarist
- Anne Milgram, New Jersey Attorney General from June 2007 to January 2010
- Josh Miller (born 1970), NFL Super Bowl-winning punter
- Jackie Miskanic (Jax) (born 1996), singer who finished third on the 14th season of American Idol
- Adam Mitzner (born 1964), attorney and writer of legal thrillers
- Ari Ne'eman (born 1987), autism rights activist
- Heather O'Reilly (born 1985), three-time Olympic Games gold medalist as a member of the United States women's national soccer team
- Jack Petruzzelli, guitarist and singer with The Fab Faux, a Beatles tribute band
- Nancy Pinkin, politician who has served as County Clerk of Middlesex County since 2021, before which she served in the New Jersey General Assembly from 2014 to 2020, where she represented the 18th Legislative District
- Matt Pinfield (born 1962), MTV VJ and writer for Rolling Stone
- Badal Roy (1939–2022), tabla player
- April Saul (born 1955), winner of the Pulitzer Prize for a series of articles written for The Philadelphia Inquirer
- Michael Seibel (born 1982), managing director at Y Combinator
- Brian Selznick (born 1966), author and illustrator of children's literature
- Jack Sinagra (born 1950), former mayor of East Brunswick and New Jersey State Senator
- Sterley Stanley (born 1966), politician and businessman serving as a member of the New Jersey General Assembly from the 18th district
- Philip Streczyk (1918–1958), World War II hero
- J. C. Thom (1835–1898), artist
- Cenk Uygur (born 1970), progressive activist and host of The Young Turks
- Jim Vallely (born 1954), Emmy Award-winning writer from Arrested Development
- Lorie Van Auken, one of the "Jersey Widows" who were vocal in demanding an official investigation into the intelligence failures which led to the September 11 terrorist attacks
- Lenny Veltman (born 1967), contestant on The Apprentice
- Stefan Weisman (born 1970), composer
- Dave Wohl (born 1949), Assistant General Manager of the Boston Celtics
- Henrietta Christian Wright (1854–1899), children's author
- Aaron Yoo (born 1979), actor who starred in the film 21
