= Breakneck Brook =

Breakneck Brook Breakneck Valley Brook
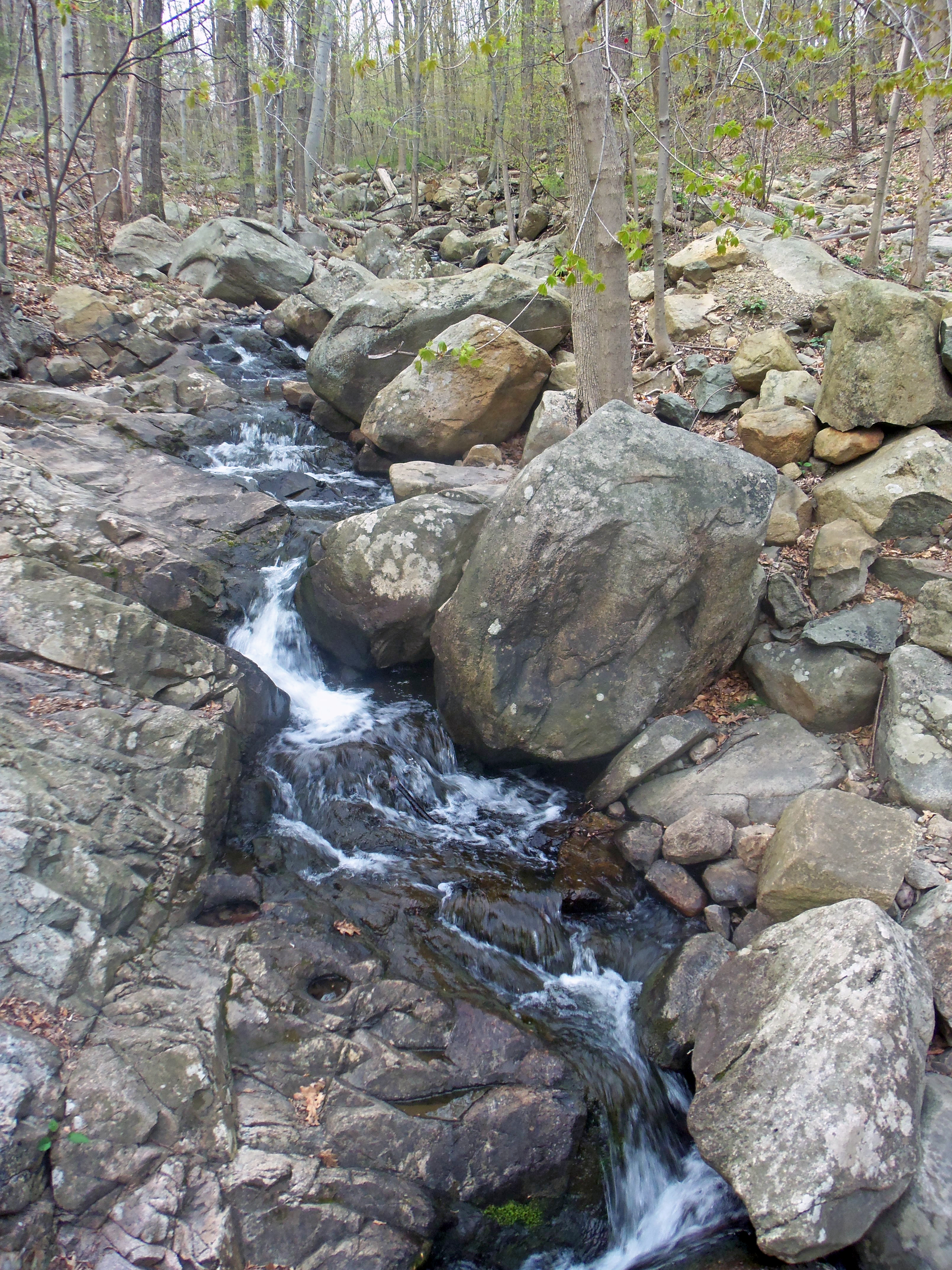
- Cascade on brook at Undercliff Trail bridge
- Etymology: From nearby mountain

Location
- Country: United States
- State: New York
- Region: Hudson Valley
- County: Putnam
- Town: Philipstown

Physical characteristics
- Source: Surprise Lake
  - location: Philipstown
  - coordinates: 41°27′23″N 73°57′17″W
  - elevation: 711 ft (217 m)
- Mouth: Hudson River
  - location: S of Storm King
  - coordinates: 41°26′18″N 73°58′25″W
  - elevation: 10 ft (3.0 m)
- Length: 1.7 mi (2.7 km), SW

Breakneck Brook, sometimes Breakneck Valley Brook, is a 1.7-mile-long (2.8 km) tributary of the Hudson River located entirely in the Putnam County town of Philipstown, New York, United States. It rises at Surprise Lake and flows southwest towards the Hudson from there, mostly through Hudson Highlands State Park. The name comes from Breakneck Ridge to its north.

Two of the park's hiking trails parallel Breakneck Brook for much of its course. Most of the land the brook flows through was once part of the estate of Edward G. Cornish, chairman of the National Lead Company in the early 20th century. He established a large dairy farm on the property, and ruins of structures built for that purpose, including a large cistern, are still visible along the stream.

== Geography ==
The Breakneck flows relatively straight in a southwest direction from its source to its mouth, draining the small and narrow valley between two of the higher mountains in the Hudson Highlands. Most of its 701-foot (214 m) vertical drop takes place in its lower half-mile (800 m).

=== Course ===
The brook begins flowing from the outlet of the dam at the southwest end of Lake Surprise, an artificial lake established in the early 20th century to support a small summer camp built around it. It descends gently at first, losing only 40 feet (12 m) from its starting elevation of 711 feet (217 m) in the quarter-mile (400 m) from its source to the boundary between the camp property and Hudson Highlands State Park. The mostly wooded camp property gives way to fully wooded state parkland.

An unpaved road parallels the brook to its northwest. Shortly after it crosses onto state land the blue-blazed Notch Trail, concludes its descent from Breakneck Ridge and joins the wood road. The road and stream draw closer as it reaches a large open area, formerly the reservoir for the dairy farm that once operated in this area. It is only 60 feet (18 m) lower than the stream was at the park boundary.

One-tenth of a mile (160 m) to the southwest, Breakneck Brook receives an unnamed tributary that flows down from a wetland to the northeast, 300 feet (91 m) above the confluence. Just below, at the ruin of an outbuilding for the dairy farm, the Notch Trail and wood road crosses the brook at a bridge also dating from the dairy farm era. Shortly afterwards, at a Y-shaped junction, the Notch Trail follows the other branch of the Y toward the mountain on the other side of the stream's valley, Bull Hill. Red blazes for the Brook Trail take over on the woods road as it continues downhill alongside the stream.

The road/trail and stream continue another tenth of a mile to 500 feet (150 m) in elevation. Here, at the narrowest point of the col between the two mountains, Breakneck Brook begins to descend more steeply. A pump house that once tapped the stream for Cornish's mansion remains. At a wooden bridge marks the crossing of the yellow-blazed Undercliff Trail, which connects the trail systems on the two mountains. A quarter-mile from here, it has already dropped 200 feet (61 m), mostly in a series of small cascades, to where it crosses the Catskill Aqueduct of New York City's water supply system, at a small rock cistern. The Brook Trail, now a footpath as the woods road has turned to the southeast to become the Cornish Estate Trail, near the ruins of the former mansion, continues to parallel closely.

Another quarter-mile covers most of the remaining 300 feet (91 m) of vertical drop. At 100 feet (30 m) in elevation, another unnamed tributary comes down from Bull Hill. The Brook Trail ends at its small trailhead on New York State Route 9D, the only paved road to cross the brook. Here the trail ends at its trailhead. Breakneck Brook empties into the Hudson River just after crossing under railroad tracks used by the passenger trains of Metro-North Railroad's Hudson Line and Amtrak's Empire Service, as well as occasional CSX freights.

=== Watershed ===
Breakneck Brook's watershed is small. It extends to the ridgelines of the two mountains it sits between, 1,280-foot (390 m) Breakneck Ridge to the north and 1,420-foot-tall (430 m) Bull Hill, the highest point in it, to the south. Although at one point on the former peak it nearly crosses the Dutchess County line into the neighboring town of Fishkill, it remains entirely within Philipstown and Putnam County.

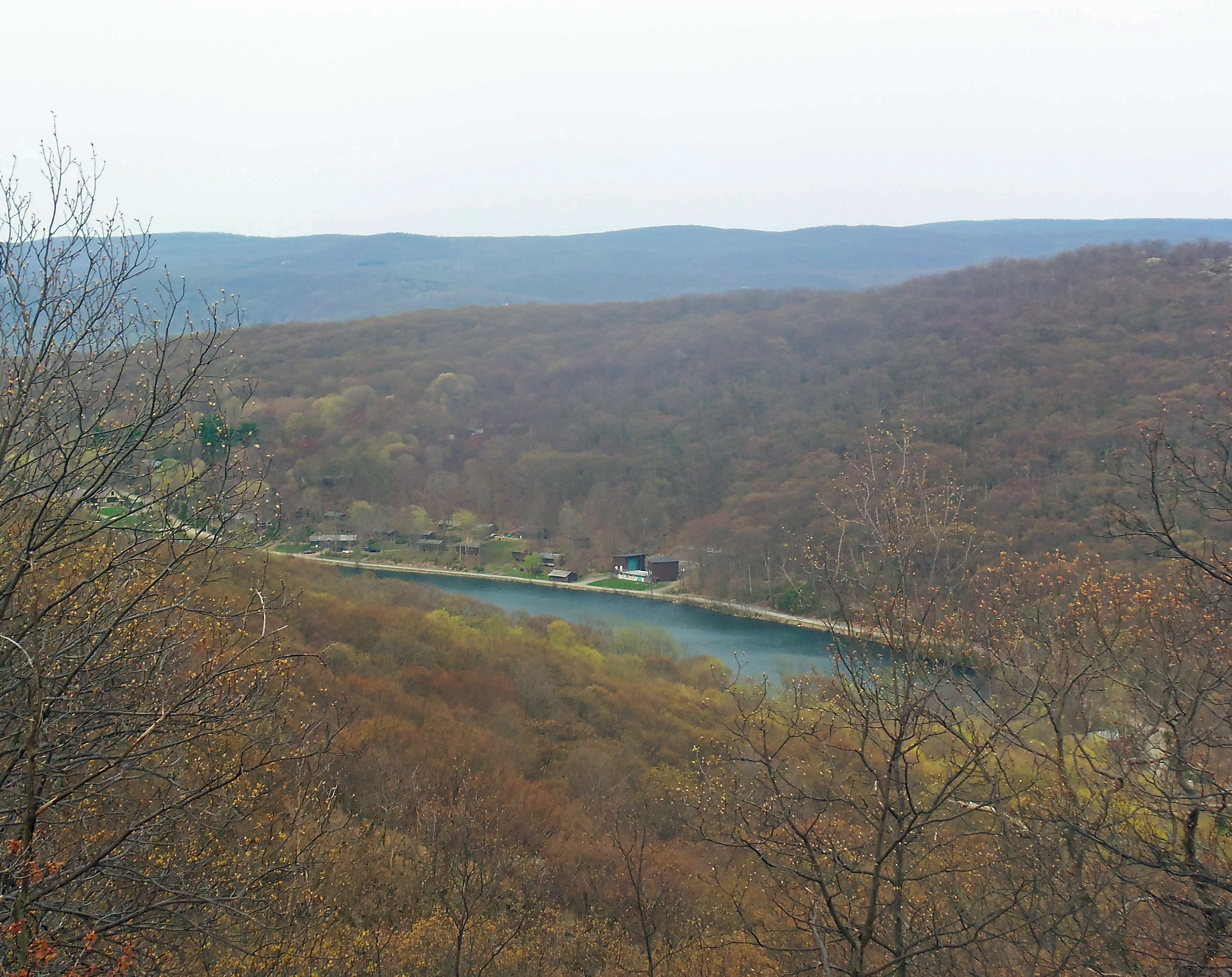
Surprise Lake and the camp

On the north it is bordered by the watershed of an unnamed stream that flows down from between Breakneck Ridge and Sugarloaf Mountain to the north of that peak. The basin does not extend much to the northeast beyond the camp at Surprise Lake; there it gives way to that of Foundry Brook, which rises from Cold Spring's municipal reservoir almost a mile (1.6 km) away to drain into the Hudson just south of Cold Spring, bounding the Breakneck Brook watershed on the east and southeast in the process. A very small portion of the watershed on its south borders on the Hudson's direct drainage from the steep western slope of Bull Hill.

The watershed is almost entirely wooded. Most of the lower portion is within Hudson Highlands State Park, where the only development regularly used since the dairy farm was abandoned are the hiking trails. At the upper end, the camp is the most significant development within the watershed, but it is not used year-round, so the watershed has no permanent population.

== History ==
Like most of the Hudson Highlands, Breakneck Brook reached its present form during the Wisconsin glaciation, as the last glacial period is known in North America. To the immediate west of the brook's valley, the glaciers forced the Hudson River through the nascent Appalachian Mountains, resulting in the present fjord and pressuring and scouring the mountains alongside it. Ice covered the entire area, with the creeks forming as it melted 20,000 years ago.

European use of the brook began in earnest at the start of the 20th century, when The Educational Alliance (EA), a New York City Jewish organization that sought to better integrate Jews into American life, bought the land around the brook's headwaters and dammed the brook to create Surprise Lake Camp, where Jewish boys from the Lower East Side of Manhattan could get away from the city during the summer. Its early alumni included Eddie Cantor, who later said it was at the camp that he realized he wanted to be an entertainer. After going through several organizational parents in its first decades, the camp assumed control of its own affairs in the late 1920s.

During the camp's early years, Chicago diamond merchant Sigmund Stern, one of the EA's board members, was building an estate for himself on 650 acres (260 ha) of the brook's lower watershed. The mansion and outbuildings were made of stone quarried from the southwest corner of nearby Breakneck Ridge. Within a few years of its completion, Stern's wife died, and he no longer wished to keep the estate. He sold it to Edward G. Cornish, then chairman of the board of the National Lead Company, one of the group of 30 companies whose share prices comprised the initial Dow Jones Industrial Average. Cornish and his wife moved in during 1916 and named the estate Northgate.

That same year the Catskill Aqueduct was completed through the property and across the brook. On the section above it, Cornish and his wife decided to establish a model dairy farm. They cleared the land and built bridges, a barn and other facilities along the brook. Farther upstream, they built another dam to provide water for the dairying operation. Local newspapers carried regular accounts of the record-breaking production the Cornishes' cows achieved.

Despite the fact that it was responsible for their own home, the Cornishes grew concerned about the effect of quarrying on the Highlands. The mass of Bull Hill was not enough to prevent them from feeling the vibrations when explosives were used to loosen stone at the quarry on the mountain's other side. In 1936 Cornish offered to donate the entire estate to the state for use as a park upon his death to prevent it from being used for quarrying. Robert Moses, the state parks commissioner at the time, rejected the offer as Cornish had already put in place deed restrictions that would have forbidden any commercial exploitation of the property, and in any event he considered the land too rugged and unsuited to the intensive use the parks he had developed were intended for.

Two years later, Cornish died at his desk in Manhattan; his wife followed him two weeks later. Their heirs, battling over the estate in court, did not move into the property and were not as diligent in maintaining it. As a result, it began to show the signs of neglect, and in 1956 a fire gutted the mansion. Six years later, the remaining heirs sold the land to Central Hudson Gas & Electric, the Mid-Hudson's major utility, which planned to build a 600,000-kilowatt pumped storage power generating station on it.

But, in the face of opposition aroused by the larger power plant proposed by Consolidated Edison for Storm King Mountain across the Hudson, which led to a landmark court ruling and spurred the growth of modern environmentalism, Central Hudson dropped the plan five years later and sold the land to the state's Taconic Parks Commission, a predecessor agency to its current owner, the New York State Office of Parks, Recreation and Historic Preservation (OPRHP). In 1970, Laurance Rockefeller, brother of New York governor Nelson Rockefeller, bought some other properties in the area where industrial development had been proposed such as Little Stony Point and Bannerman's Island through the family's Jackson Hole Preserve. They were then donated to the state as well and combined into Hudson Highlands State Park, which has subsequently been expanded to include other discontiguous parcels along the east side of the river from Peekskill to Fishkill.

The ruins of the estate remained, making the trails in the area a popular destination for hikers. All continued to deteriorate as reforestation continued. The dam in particular began to fail and leak. In 2011 OPRHP removed it, finding it too expensive to repair. It told the state's Department of Environmental Conservation (DEC) that doing so would also be beneficial as "it will result in the restoration of the original streambed and riparian area."

== Geology ==
The Breakneck Brook valley runs parallel to some of the faults in that area of Philipstown, along with Foundry Brook, the Hudson tributary to the immediate south. Bedrock in the valley is primarily pyroxene-rich gneiss, while nearer the mountain summits it is more anorthosite-rich granitic gneiss. The latter is especially resistant to weathering and erosion, resulting not only in the height of the peaks but the steep cliffs and slopes below them.

The faults were steepened by glacial pressures as the Wisconsin glaciers moved south. Eventually they covered the mountains completely. When they melted they left behind the soil types that still dominate the Breakneck Brook valley—glacial till in the higher elevations, and a layer of kame-like water-sorted sediments topped with till closer to the brook.

== Hydrology ==
The United States Geological Survey treats Breakneck Brook and the similarly small tributaries to its north in Dutchess County as a single watershed for data purposes. DEC follows the federal lead in its own data, but classifies streams separately for regulatory purposes. Under those regulations, the entire brook and Surprise Lake are considered Class B waters, suitable for primary and secondary contact recreation, and fishing.

While Class B waters are not considered hazardous to aquatic life, it is unlikely to harbor any fish species commonly found in the river. In a 2006 paper on the role of the tributaries in shaping the river's fish population, Robert Schmidt of Simon's Rock College and DEC biologist Thomas Lake expressed doubt that any river fish ventured into tributaries like Breakneck Brook distinguished by steep drops they took just before reaching the river. "They have probably been inaccessible to Hudson River fishes since the glacial lakes filling the Hudson Valley drained," the authors wrote.

== See also ==
- List of rivers in New York
