= Orchard Heights, New Jersey =

Populated place in Middlesex County, New Jersey, US

- Unincorporated community
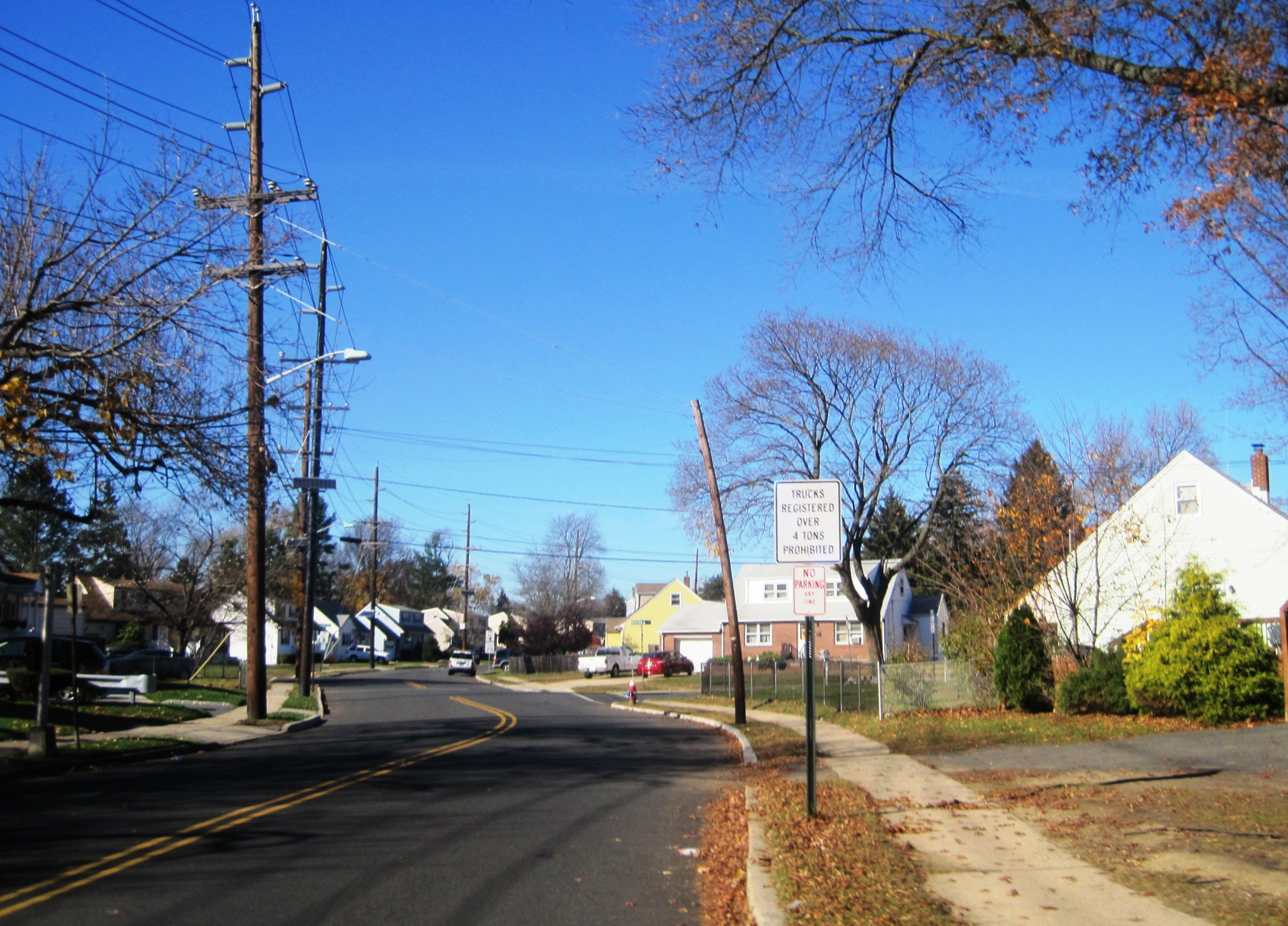
- Along Merrill Avenue

- Location in Middlesex County Orchard Heights (New Jersey) Orchard Heights (the United States)
- Coordinates: 40°26′13″N 74°24′11″W
- Country: United States
- State: New Jersey
- County: Middlesex
- Township: East Brunswick
- Elevation: 112 ft (34 m)
- GNIS feature ID: 879007

Orchard Heights is an unincorporated community located within East Brunswick Township in Middlesex County, in the U.S. state of New Jersey. The area is part of a suburban residential neighborhood between Milltown and Dunhams Corner Roads (County Route 535) interchange with New Jersey Route 18. Near the area includes two schools (one elementary school and East Brunswick High School), churches, and St. Mary's Cemetery. The subdivision was planned and built in about 1954.
