= Halls Corner, California =

Unincorporated community in California, United States

- Unincorporated community
- Location in California Halls Corner, California (the United States)
- Coordinates: 36°20′33″N 119°48′23″W
- Country: United States
- State: California
- County: Kings
- Elevation: 230 ft (70 m)

Halls Corner is an unincorporated community in Kings County, California, United States. It is located 3 miles (4.8 km) north-northwest of Lemoore, at an elevation of 230 feet (70 m). Hall's Corner is the intersection of California State Route 41 and Grangeville Boulevard. David Hall built a store on the southeast corner.
