= Halls Corner, New Jersey =

Populated place in Middlesex County, New Jersey, US

- Unincorporated community
- Location within Middlesex County, New Jersey Location within New Jersey Location within the United States
- Coordinates: 40°25′03″N 74°24′45″W
- Country: United States
- State: New Jersey
- County: Middlesex
- Township: East Brunswick
- Named for: J. C. Hall
- Elevation: 112 ft (34 m)
- Time zone: UTC−05:00 (Eastern (EST))
  - Summer (DST): UTC−04:00 (EDT)
- GNIS feature ID: 876894

Halls Corner or Halls Corners is an unincorporated community located within East Brunswick in Middlesex County, in the U.S. state of New Jersey.

The community was named for J. C. Hall, a local hotel owner.
