= Starplex Cinemas =

American movie theater chain

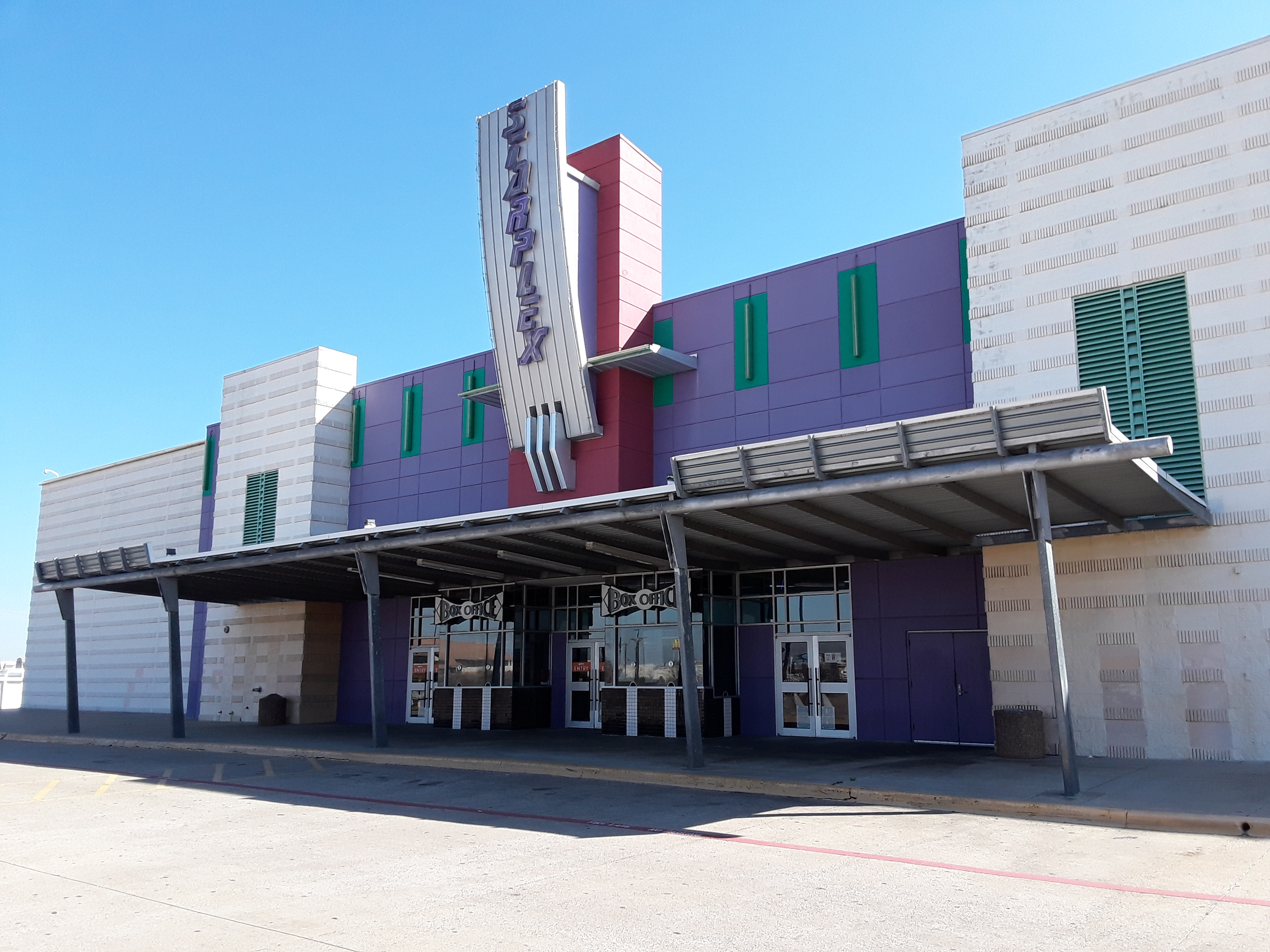
- A Starplex location in Irving, Texas, then operated as AMC Classic on 2017. Closed as of 2023.
- Type: Subsidiary
- Industry: Cinema
- Predecessor: Showplex Cinemas
- Defunct: 2017
- Successor: AMC Classic
- Headquarters: Dallas, United States
- Key people: AMC Theatres (Parent)
- Owners: AMC Entertainment
- Website: www.amctheatres.com

Starplex Cinemas was a Dallas-based, American movie-theater chain which at it height had 34 locations across the United States. In 2012, Showbiz Cinemas acquired the Starplex location in Kingwood, Texas. Later, Starplex merged with Showplex Cinemas. Starplex was among the major theaters to pull The Interview after threats were made. On July 14, 2015, it was announced AMC Theatres would acquire Starplex, with many former Starplex theaters operating as AMC Classic by mid 2017.
