= Solomon Schechter Day School of Raritan Valley =

Defunct Jewish school in New Jersey, USA

Coordinates: 40.428628°N 74.422492°W

Solomon Schechter Day School of Raritan Valley was a Conservative Jewish day school that served students in kindergarten through eighth grade that was located in East Brunswick, New Jersey, United States, until its closure before the start of the 2013–14 school year. It was affiliated with the Solomon Schechter Day School Association. The school's mission was "To operate a financially sound Jewish Day School that offers a superior general studies program coupled with a rich program in Judaic studies in an environment that thrives on Jewish values", with classes in all grades averaging 18 students.

The school is located in the Raritan Valley, which covers Union, Somerset, and Hunterdon counties, as well as the northern portion of Middlesex County.

As of the 2009–10 school year, the school had an enrollment of 120 students and 12.9 classroom teachers (on a FTE basis), for a student-teacher ratio of 9.3:1.

== Awards and recognition ==
During the 2009–10 school year, Solomon Schechter Day School of Raritan Valley was awarded the Blue Ribbon School Award of Excellence by the United States Department of Education, the highest award an American school can receive. The school was the only private school among the nine winners in New Jersey that year, one of 50 private schools nationwide to be honored and one of only two Jewish-affiliated schools to receive this recognition. Head of School Dr. Howard Rosenblatt indicated that the school qualified for this national honor by demonstrating sustained academic achievement in the school over a period of years. An application was submitted in fall 2008 and reviewed by the Council for American Private Education, which passes on its choices for private schools to be honored to the Department of Education.

== Closing ==
The school announced on its website on August 19, 2013, that, "after over three decades of educating our children, Solomon Schechter Day School of Raritan Valley will not be opening its doors this fall. This, despite the heroic efforts of many this past week and the outpouring of interest and support from the Rabbis in Middlesex and Mercer Counties, Community Leaders, parents, grandparents, former parents, alumni and friends...." While enrollment had peaked at 300, the 2012–13 school year brought only 120 students and by the first parent meeting before the 2013–14 school year only 40 students were enrolled.
