= Brookview, New Jersey =

Populated place in Middlesex County, New Jersey, US

- Unincorporated community
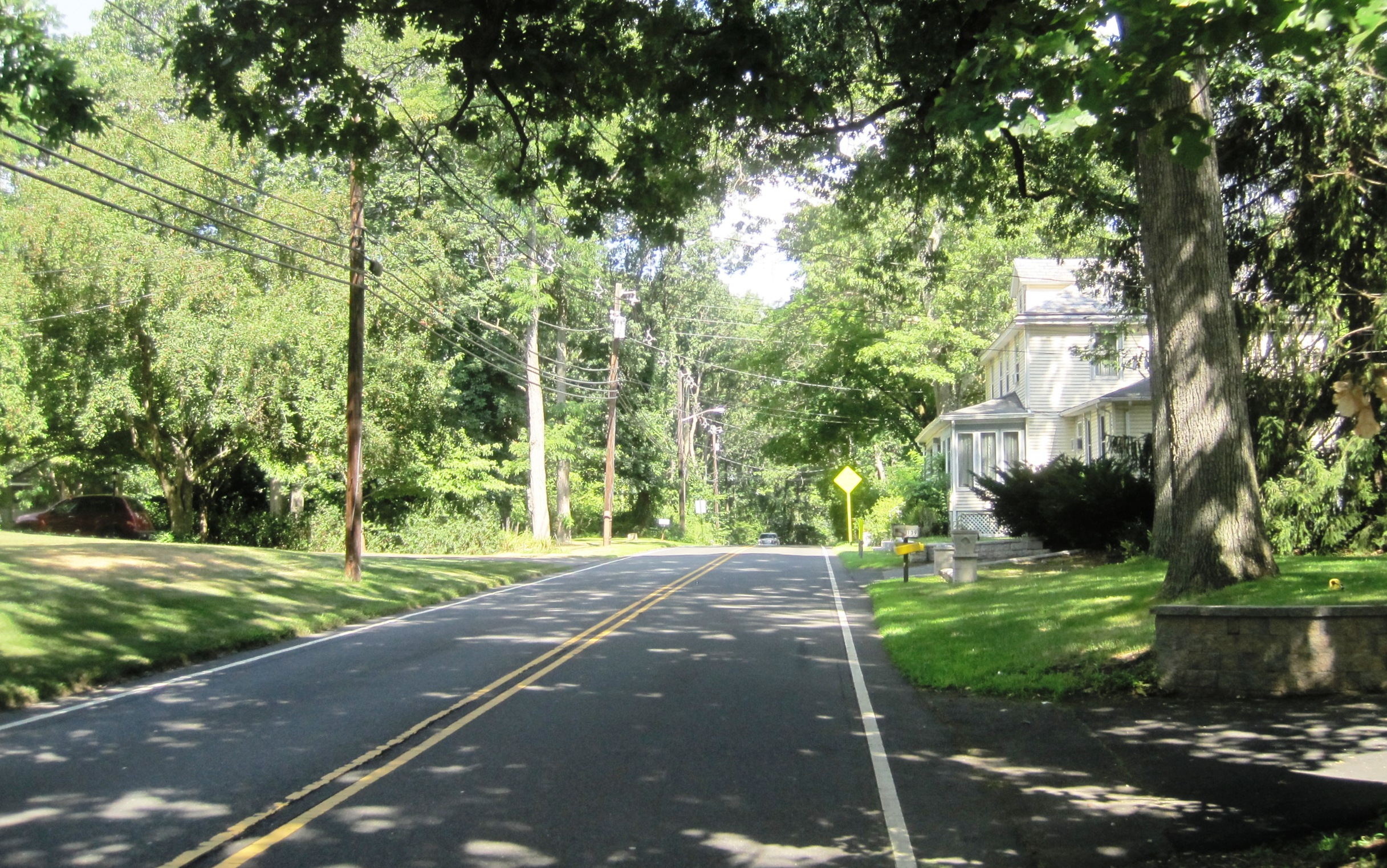
- Along Church Lane

- Location within Middlesex County, New Jersey Location within New Jersey Location within the United States
- Coordinates: 40°25′14″N 74°28′27″W
- Country: United States
- State: New Jersey
- County: Middlesex
- Township: East Brunswick
- Elevation: 95 ft (29 m)
- GNIS feature ID: 874971

Brookview is an unincorporated community located within East Brunswick Township in Middlesex County, in the U.S. state of New Jersey. The settlement is located along Church Lane at the former Newark–Trenton Fast Line right-of-way, now a PSE&G transmission line corridor. The Brookview Volunteer Fire Company, established in 1952, takes its name from the settlement.
