= Surprise Lake Camp =

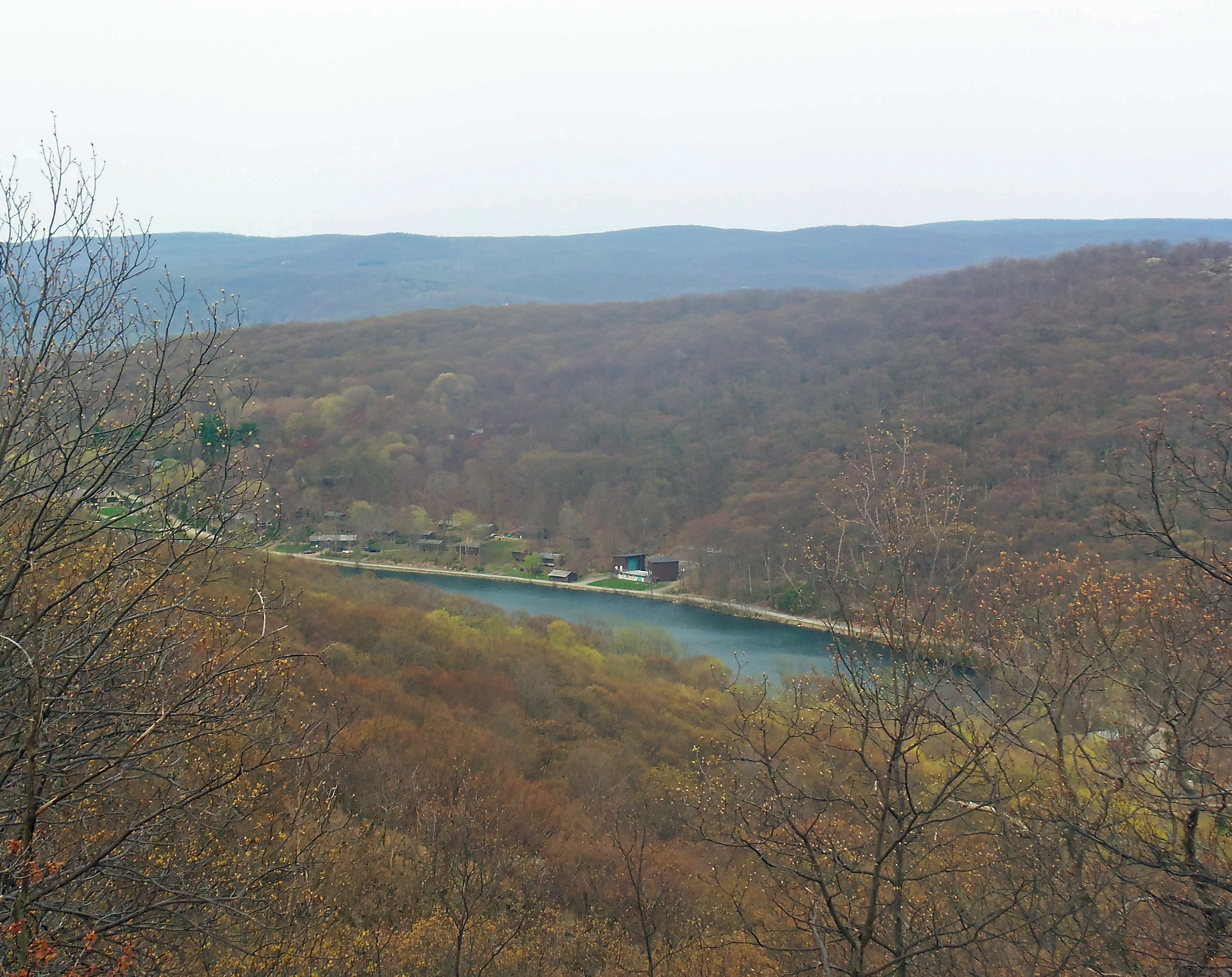
- Surprise Lake Camp from Breakneck Ridge to the northwest

Location
- 382 Lake Surprise Road; Cold Spring, NY 10516; 41°27′39″N 73°57′0″W

Information
- Type: Jewish summer camp
- Religious affiliation: Judaism
- Established: 1902; 124 years ago
- Founder: Educational Alliance
- President: Michael Zbar
- Director: Adam Bendeson
- Gender: Co-educational
- Affiliation: ACA
- Website: surpriselake.org

Surprise Lake Camp is a non-profit sleepaway camp located on approximately 600 acres in North Highlands, New York (approximately 60 miles (97 km), north of New York City). It is the oldest Jewish summer camp in the United States.

== History ==
Founded in 1901 by the Educational Alliance as a camp for Jewish boys from the tenements of Manhattan's Lower East Side around the lake that Breakneck Brook rises from, it incorporated as Surprise Lake Camp in 1902. In 1911 the 92nd Street Y joined in the operation of the camp, and in 1917 the camp became an independent agency within the newly formed Federation of Jewish Philanthropies. Surprise lake camp first admitted girls in 1952, after the Women's League established a girls section in the camp. The camp continues to operate as a summer camp for children from the New York metropolitan area. In 2005, the camp sold 200 acres and granted a conservation easement over an additional 465 acres of camp property to the Open Space Institute, thus ensuring the preservation of these undeveloped lands adjacent to Hudson Highlands State Park. The camp was the setting of a popular 2013 viral video on the topic of feminine hygiene entitled Camp Gyno.

In its early years of operation, the camp was subjected to antisemitic demonstrations of cross burning by local members of the Ku Klux Klan, but the camp developed a better relationship with the surrounding residents over time. For its campers who came from immigrant homes, many of them Yiddish-speaking, the camp emphasized acculturation to mainstream American styles of speech and appearance. Surprise Lake Camp is part of a large-scale archival project directed by YIVO (the Institute for Jewish Research) with the goal of preserving the historical record of the Jews of New York City.

== Former campers and staff ==
Among Surprise Lake's first campers was Eddie Cantor, who credited his youthful performances at Surprise Lake Camp (also depicted in the 1953 biopic The Eddie Cantor Story) with giving him the encouragement to pursue show business. Upon achieving success as an entertainer, he became one of the camp's most ardent supporters. He was a member of the Surprise Lake Camp Board of Directors, and a theater at the camp was named for him.

Other notable Surprise Lake campers have included Neil Diamond (who has identified Pete Seeger's visits to the camp as his earliest exposure to a musical role model), Jax, Joseph Heller, Jerry Stiller, Gene Simmons, Larry King, Neil Simon, Cody Brotter, and Walter Matthau.
