= Robert H. Boyle =

Author, environmentalist and conservationist

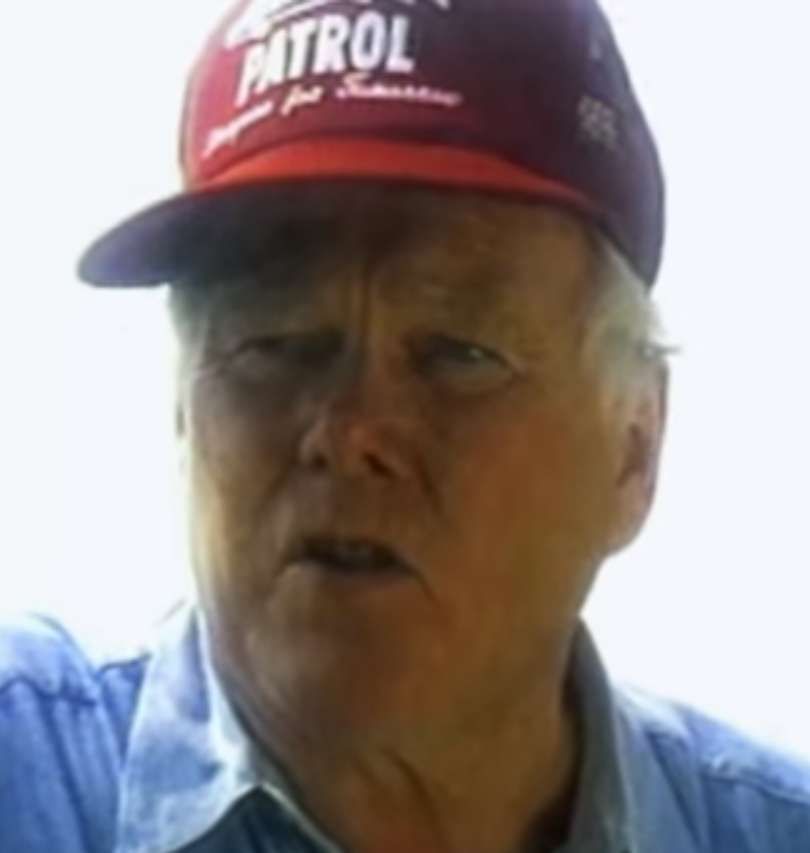
- Robert H. Boyle in the 1994 PBS special, Sturgeon: Ancient Survivors of the Deep
- Born: Robert Hamilton Boyle Jr. August 21, 1928; Brooklyn, New York
- Died: May 19, 2017 (aged 88); Cooperstown, New York
- Occupation: Journalist
- Known for: Author, environmentalist, conservationist
- Notable work: Sports Illustrated Vault; The Hudson River: A Natural and Unnatural History
- Awards: 1981 Communicator of the Year award, National Wildlife Federation

Robert Hamilton Boyle Jr. (August 21, 1928 – May 19, 2017) was an environmental activist, conservationist, book author, journalist and former senior writer for Sports Illustrated. In 1966, Boyle founded the Hudson River Fishermen's Association (HRFA) with its members serving as sentries to protect the river and its inhabitants, help reverse the deterioration caused by river pollution, and bring polluters to justice. The organization grew over the years, and in 1986, was officially renamed Riverkeeper after being merged with HRFA's Riverkeeper program. It was the first "keeper" group in the global Waterkeeper Alliance movement.

As senior writer, Boyle took full advantage of Sports Illustrated to attract public attention to various conservation and environmental concerns, including the substantial fish kills resulting from the thermal discharge water of power plants, and the effects of acid rain. He was one of the first journalists to report on the methyl mercury, DDT and PCB contamination of saltwater fish when, in October 1970, he wrote Poison Roams Our Coastal Seas. His research and hands-on activism were crucial to the first litigation in a federal court case titled Scenic Hudson Preservation Conference v. Federal Power Commission that resulted in judgments and substantial fines against water polluters. In recognition of his work over the years, Boyle received the 1981 Communicator of the Year award from the National Wildlife Federation.

== Early life, education, and military service ==
Boyle was born in Brooklyn, New York to Robert Sr. and Elizabeth (Coundouris) Boyle, then residents of Park Slope, but he actually grew up in the Murray Hill section of Manhattan where he nurtured his love for fishing. During his boyhood in the 1940s, he attended boarding school in Highland Falls, and spent his free time fishing and developing what would become his lifelong affinity with the Hudson River.

Boyle received his B.A. in history from Trinity College in Hartford, Connecticut in 1949, and furthered his education to earn his M.A. in history and international affairs from Yale University. He served in the United States Marine Corps in the Atlantic Fleet during the Korean War, achieving the rank of second lieutenant. He then briefly attended Trinity College in Dublin and the Universitat de Barcelona in Spain, where he also enjoyed a stint as a professional baseball player.

== Career and activism ==
In 1953, Boyle returned to the US and began his career as a writer for the United Press. In September 1954, he secured a position with Time Inc., and wrote articles for Time Magazine, Life, and Sports Illustrated, the company's newest magazine with only four published issues at the time. Some of his most notable work included coverage of Nikita Khrushchev's visit to the US in 1959, a 1965 Sports Illustrated cover story when the New York Jets drafted Joe Namath, and coverage of Muhammad Ali resisting the military draft in 1966.

Boyle's environmental activism came to light in December 1959 when he wrote his first conservation article about Tule Lake for Sports Illustrated. At the time, he was working in the San Francisco Bureau for Time as their West Coast correspondent, and was on location hunting butterflies with entomologist Vladimir Nabokov when he learned that a landfill was planned for the Tulelake Irrigation District, and "that farmers in northern California were draining Tule Lake, a refuge for some 10 million birds during their southern migration". He was shocked by what was happening, stating: "I took it for granted people weren't going to sully the world. I thought it would get better, not worse". It wasn't long after the Tule Lake incident that Boyle started taking on much bigger opponents, including various state and federal governments and their respective resource agencies.

"The same scummy element that manipulated boxers and fixed fights during the Frankie Carbo era is the kind that pollutes the earth. I've been called a fanatic, but the guy who's poisoning a river is the fanatic."

— Robert H. Boyle in Letter From The Publisher by Philip G. Howlett relative to the Tule Lake conservation article Boyle wrote for Sports Illustrated.

=== Riverkeeper, conservationist, environmentalist ===
Boyle's affinity with the Hudson River and fishing fueled his environmental activism. He was determined to clean-up the highly polluted Hudson River with its toxic waste and substantial fish kills that had garnered national attention and became the butt of jokes by the late Johnny Carson, former host of The Tonight Show. Boyle was aware that traditional conservation and environmental efforts were not working, and that much more needed to be done. He founded the Hudson River Fishermen's Association (HRFA) in March 1966 after meeting with a group of concerned citizens at the Crotonville American Legion Hall. Fishermen, environmentalists, and scientists comprised the group, and shared Boyle's anger and concerns over the deterioration of the Hudson River. Prior to the meeting, Boyle had rediscovered two forgotten laws about pollution of navigable waters in the United States, and announced his research findings at the meeting. One of those laws was the Federal Refuse Act of 1899 which the HRFA used as the basis for their litigation in federal court, resulting in a string of victories and substantial fines charged against water polluters. In 1983, HRFA established the Riverkeeper program, and in 1986, merged the two into a single group officially named Riverkeeper.

"[Bob Boyle] originated the principles by which Riverkeeper still operates today: support the grassroots; be data driven; and, don't flinch when the going gets tough."

— Paul Gallay in Riverkeeper's tribute to Robert H. Boyle

Boyle's research and articles were crucial to the litigation brought in 1965 by Scenic Hudson Preservation Conference (Scenic Hudson) against Consolidated Edison (Con Ed), New York's primary electric utility company in the lawsuit titled Scenic Hudson Preservation Conference v. Federal Power Commission. He relayed the concerns of Hudson River Valley citizens and environmentalists regarding Con Ed's proposed pumped-storage power plant on Storm King Mountain in the Hudson Highlands, not the least of which included the potential for irreparable ecological harm, the destruction of critical habitat for aquatic species, and the killing of small fish by the plant's water-intake equipment. In late December 1965, the court ruled in favor of Scenic Hudson in that round of litigation stating that "the FPC had to consider the environmental consequences of the plan, which they had not done." Litigation dragged on until 1980 when Con Ed entered into an agreement with conservation groups. Boyle was a signatory for one of the groups, ending the effort to build the pumped-storage power plant. The Con Ed action "became the basis of environmental law in the United States by establishing the right of citizens to sue the government to protect natural resources".

"Their suit resulted in the first federal court ruling affirming the right of citizens to mount challenges on the basis of potential harm to aesthetic, recreational or conservational values as well as tangible economic injury".

— Sam Roberts summary of the lawsuit entitled, Scenic Hudson Preservation Conference v. Federal Power Commission, as published in The New York Times.

=== Sports and environmental writing ===
As a writer for Sports Illustrated, Boyle broke the mold of typical sportswriter covering football, boxing, golf and other sports. He extended his range of topics and wrote about various outdoor activities, birds, and other topics that he was passionate about from when he was a small boy, such as fishing and the river.

In 1969, Boyle published The Hudson River: A Natural and Unnatural History, describing the negative effects of pollution on the waterway. It was positively reviewed as a "book of great charm with many nuggets of little known lore".

"By nature a fisherman, by profession a writer and editor, by soul a poet, Robert Boyle of Croton, N. Y., has summoned all of his talents to the producing of a magnificent book about that 'Great River of the Mountains,' the Hudson".

— Carl Carmer in his 1970 New York Times' book review

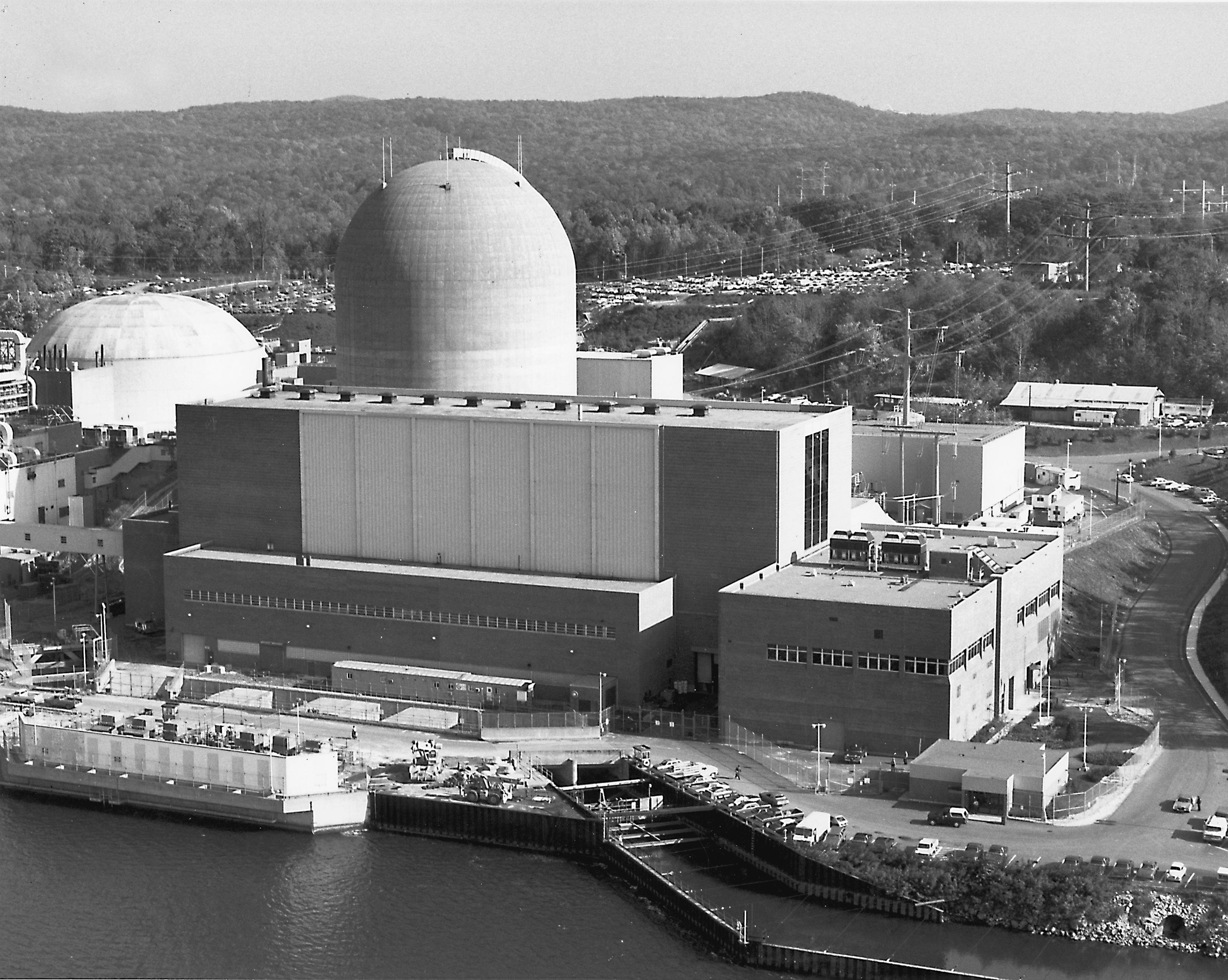
Indian Point nuclear power plant on the Hudson River

In 1970, Boyle "was among the first journalists to report that North American Fish were contaminated with toxic polychlorinated biphenyls, or PCBs", and provided in-depth coverage about the methyl mercury, DDT and PCB contamination of saltwater fish in an article he wrote for Sports Illustrated, titled Poison Roams Our Coastal Seas. He also exposed sizeable fish kills in the Hudson that was caused by the Indian Point nuclear power plant dumping their thermal discharge water into the river. (Note: Nuclear plant discharge water creates thermal water pollution by changing the ambient water temperature. The temperature of the discharge water typically ranges around 30–40 °C (86–104 °F) when it is released back into a river, lake, or other body of water.) His efforts helped instigate a billion-dollar cleanup effort.

In 1981, he received the Communicator of the Year award from the National Wildlife Federation.

"When Senior Writer Robert H. Boyle recently was named 1981 Communicator of the Year by the National Wildlife Federation, we were not at all surprised. The award, which is the environmentalist's equivalent of an Oscar, is given annually to "distinguished journalists who have made outstanding contributions to the conservation of the nation's natural resources."

— Philip G. Howlett, in his Letter From The Publisher, Sports Illustrated

In 1983, Boyle simultaneously published two books: Acid Rain, which highlighted the threat to wildlife and ultimately human health attributed to acid rain "caused by the emission of sulfur dioxide and nitrogen oxides from the combustion of fossil fuels"; and At the Top of Their Game, a collection of essays about people driven to achieve great things, including profiles of tennis official Jimmy Van Alen, novelist Zane Grey, dog trainer Robert Abady, handballer Jimmy Jacobs, and fly fisherman Charles E. Brooks. Boyle ended his 34-year affiliation with Riverkeeper in 2000, following a dispute with the organization's attorney, Robert F. Kennedy Jr., over Kennedy's hiring of a scientist with a criminal record.

Boyle's last book, published in 2006, was Dapping, the Exciting Way of Fishing Flies that Fly Quiver and Jump.

== Personal life and death ==
Boyle married Jane Crosby Sanger, with whom he had a daughter and two sons. Jane died in 1975, and Boyle later married Kathryn Belous, who survived him. In 2017, Boyle died of cancer at the age of 88 in Cooperstown, New York.
