= Storm King State Park =

State park in Orange County, New York

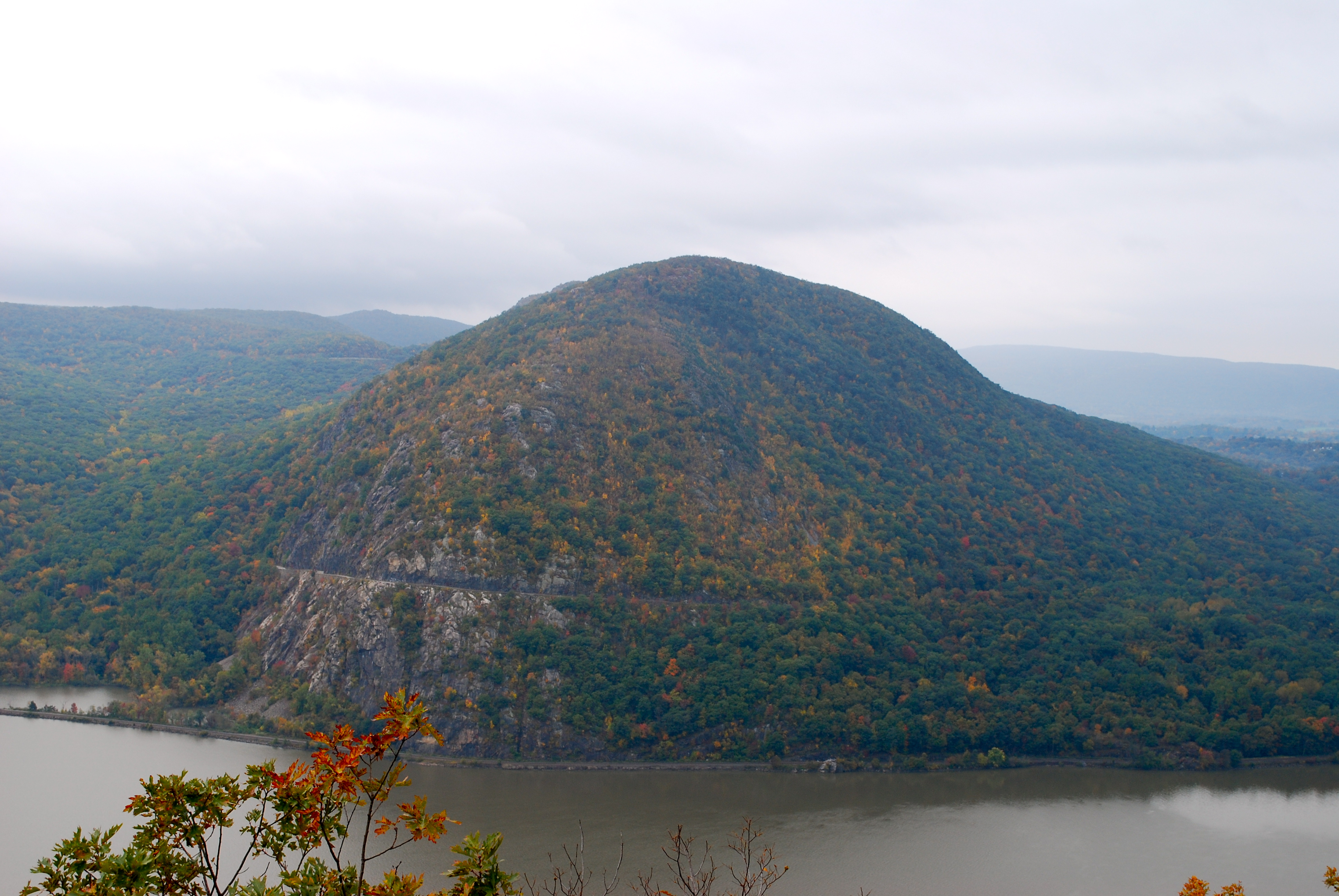
- View of Storm King Mountain from atop Break Neck Ridge

- Location within New York
- Type: State park
- Location: Cornwall-on-Hudson, New York
- Coordinates: 41°25′37″N 73°59′20″W
- Area: 1,972 acres (7.98 km^{2})
- Created: 1922
- Operator: Palisades Interstate Park Commission; New York State Office of Parks, Recreation and Historic Preservation
- Visitors: 33,873 (in 2020)
- Open: All year
- Website: Storm King State Park

Storm King State Park is a 1,972-acre (7.98 km^{2}) state park in Orange County, New York. The park is in the southeast part of the Town of Cornwall, next to the Hudson River. A central feature of the park is Storm King Mountain.

== History ==
New York physician Ernest Stillman donated the park's initial 800 acres (3.2 km^{2}) to the Palisades Interstate Park Commission in 1922, hoping to protect land surrounding the Storm King Highway. The park has since grown to its current 1,972-acre (7.98 km^{2}) size through additional donations and purchases of land.

The park was the focus of preservation efforts in the early 1960s after a proposal by Consolidated Edison to build a hydro-electric power plant on the property. The Scenic Hudson Preservation Conference was formed by citizens opposed to the project, and the proposal was eventually dropped following a 17-year battle to preserve the park's natural state.

A 1999 forest fire at the park caused the detonation of unexploded ordnance that had been fired over 100 years prior by a cannon manufacturer across the river. Additional unexploded shells were also discovered that likely originated from a nearby West Point artillery range. After the fire was put out, the park remained closed to hikers for three years as remaining explosives were located and removed.

== Description ==
Storm King State Park is undeveloped except for limited parking and trails. The park offers hiking and seasonal deer hunting. Several named trails are included within the park, which features Storm King Mountain as a central feature.

The park's forests are part of the Northeastern coastal forests ecoregion.

== See also ==
- List of New York state parks
