= Jeffrey Reich =

Jeffrey P. Reich
- Born: October 30, 1957 (age 68); Cambridge, Massachusetts
- Education: Duke University
- Occupations: Senior managing director and board member of Bear Stearns (1985–1995)

Jeffrey Peter Reich (born October 30, 1957) was a senior managing director and member of the board of directors of Bear Stearns Co. Inc. He retired from Bear Stearns in 1995 and has since been the CEO of Bridge Street Capital Management LLC.

== Early life ==
Reich graduated from Duke University in 1979 with a B.A. in economics. He received his M.B.A. from the University of Connecticut in 1985.

== Bear Stearns ==
Reich was one of the first mortgage derivative traders at Bear Stearns, focusing on interest only/principal only stripped mortgage backed securities. Reich masterminded the repackaging of a total of $1.6 billion of Federal National Mortgage Association strip deals in one day in March 1992.

== Other ==
After Bear Stearns, Reich started an investment company in Irvington, New York. This company, Bridge Street Capital Management has been instrumental in the redevelopment of Irvington's Hudson River waterfront. Reich and his partners received an award from Scenic Hudson for responsible development.

Reich has served on the board of directors of the National Organization on Disability (NOD) since 1990.
