= Chaseholm Farm Creamery =

Farm in Pine Plains, New York

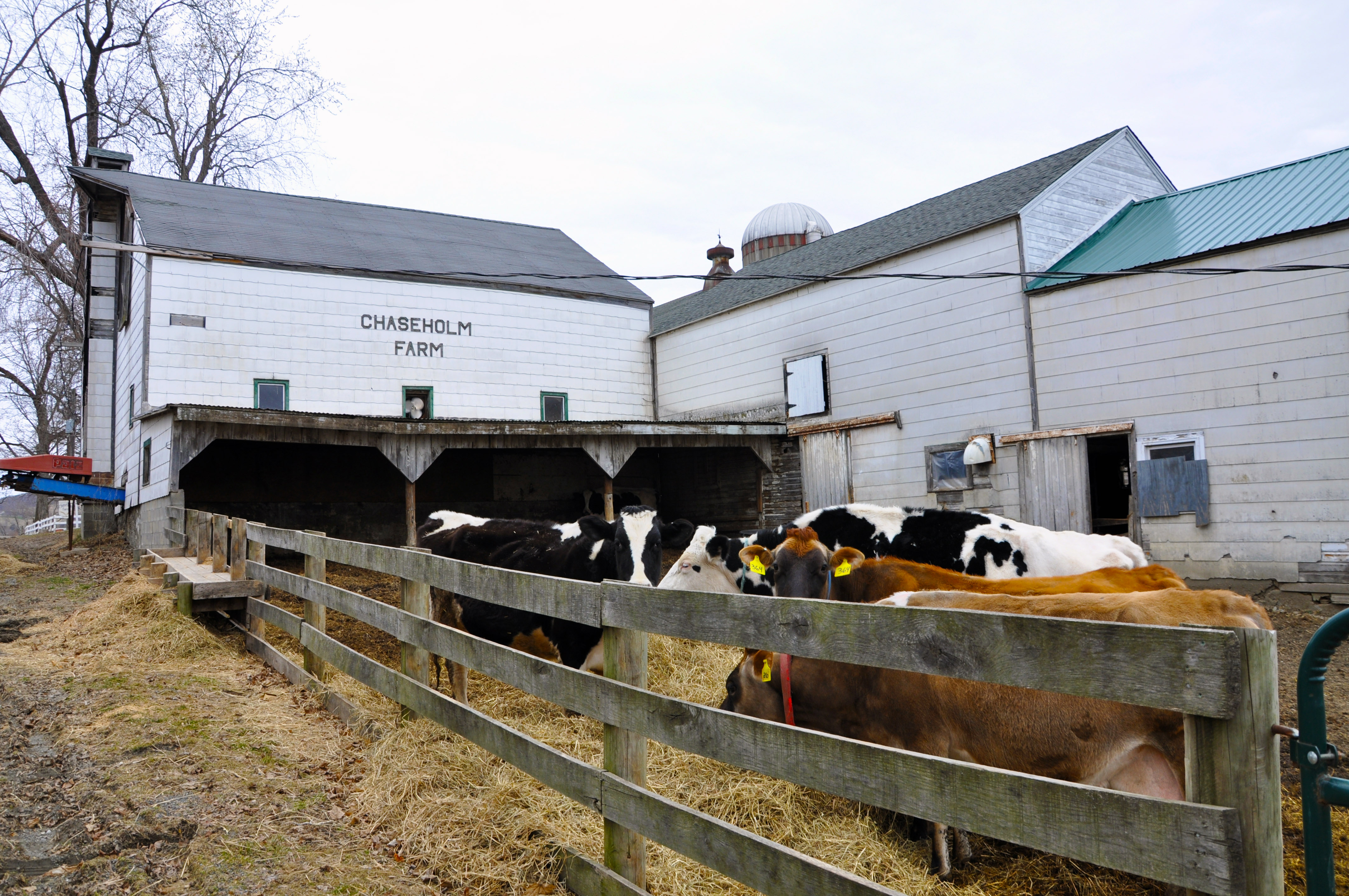
Chasehold Farm Creamery cows

The Chaseholm Farm Creamery is a 350-acre (140 ha) family-run farm in Pine Plains, New York, on the borders of Dutchess and Columbia Counties in New York's Hudson Valley, protected by the Columbia Land Conservancy. It works with many farms in the surrounding Hudson Valley as part of the local food movement. The Chaseholm Farm Creamery is currently run by siblings Rory and Sarah Chase.

== Farm operation ==
The Chaseholm Farm Creamery has a herd of 30 cows, both Jersey and Holstein, run by Sarah Chase. Calves are kept with their mothers as a new method in hopes that the cows will produce milk for longer. The cows have over 70 acres of land for grazing. The hay they eat is sprayed with lime to organically keep pests away and raise the pH of the crop. The herd is milked by Sarah and a helper twice a day, and the milk is sent down the road to brother Rory Chase at the creamery. The farm has attained a raw milk license, and sells raw milk in their farm store.

== Creamery operation ==
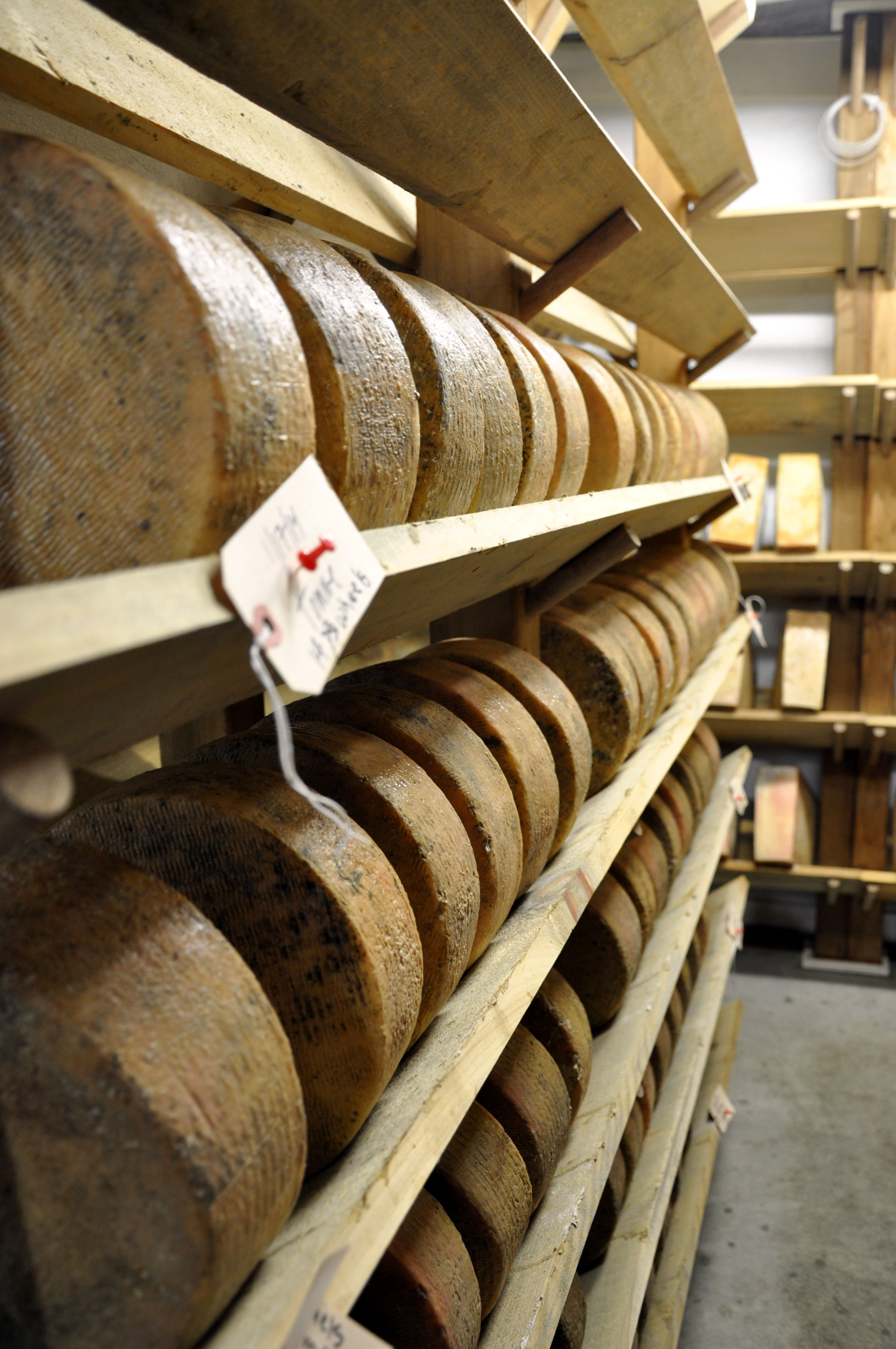
The cheese aging cave of the Chaseholm Farm Creamery

Home to The Amazing Real Live Food Co., the creamery was founded in 2007 and is run by Rory Chase, who redid a barn built in the 1930s by his grandfather in order to make a cheese making plant and aging cave. Chaseholm crafts a number of different styles of cheese, most out of the French tradition. The milk from their own cows is used to make seven types of artisan cheeses. The seven current cheeses are Alpag Gruyere, Chaseholm Camembert, Moonlight Chaource, Probiotic Herbed Farmer's Cheese, a spicy Queso Blanco, an herbal Queso Blanco, and Stella Vallis Tomme.
