= Waterkeeper Alliance =

Worldwide network of environmental organizations

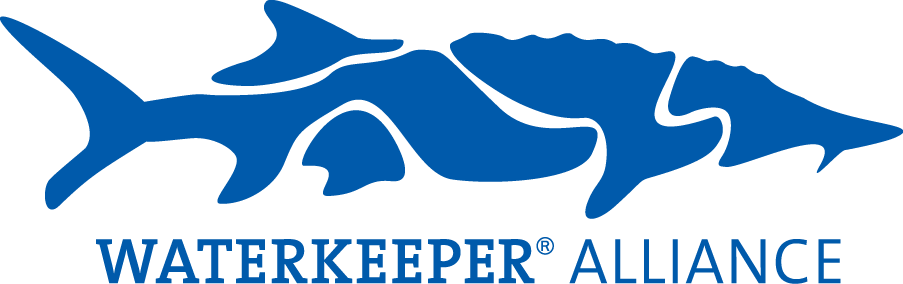
- Formation: 1999
- Headquarters: New York City, U.S.
- CEO: Marc Yaggi
- Website: waterkeeper.org

Waterkeeper Alliance is a worldwide network of environmental organizations founded in 1999 that work to protect bodies of water around the United States and the world. By December 2019, the group said it had grown to 350 members in 46 countries, with half the membership outside the U.S.; the alliance had added 200 groups in the last five years.

In 1983, the founding Riverkeeper organization, founded by Robert H. Boyle, formed around the Hudson River in New York, in response to the untreated sewage and industrial water pollution that was degrading water quality in the river. Today, Waterkeeper Alliance, founded by the original Waterkeeper groups including Riverkeeper, Soundkeeper and Baykeeper and Robert F. Kennedy Jr. and based in Manhattan, unites all Waterkeeper organizations. The group helps to coordinate and cover issues affecting Waterkeepers that work to protect rivers, lakes, bays, sounds, and other water bodies around the world. In the United States, only 52 of the 180 groups cover watersheds west of the Mississippi River.

In June 2019, the group announced a project with online travel website Culture Trip called "Waterkeeper Warriors". They named 20 activists who "represent the impact one person can make on an issue that affects us all."
