= Riverkeeper =

US non-profit environmental organization

- Formation: 1966 (Hudson River Fishermen's Association)
- Headquarters: Ossining, New York
- Hudson Riverkeeper: Tracy Brown
- Website: riverkeeper.org

Riverkeeper is a non-profit environmental organization dedicated to the protection of the Hudson River and its tributaries, as well as the watersheds that provide New York City with its drinking water. It started out as the Hudson River Fisherman's Association (HRFA) in 1966. In 1986, the group merged with the Hudson Riverkeeper Fund it established in 1983 and took on the name Riverkeeper. In 1999, the Waterkeeper Alliance was created as an umbrella organization to unite and support "keeper" organizations.

The organization has lobbied against nuclear power and hydropower.

== History ==
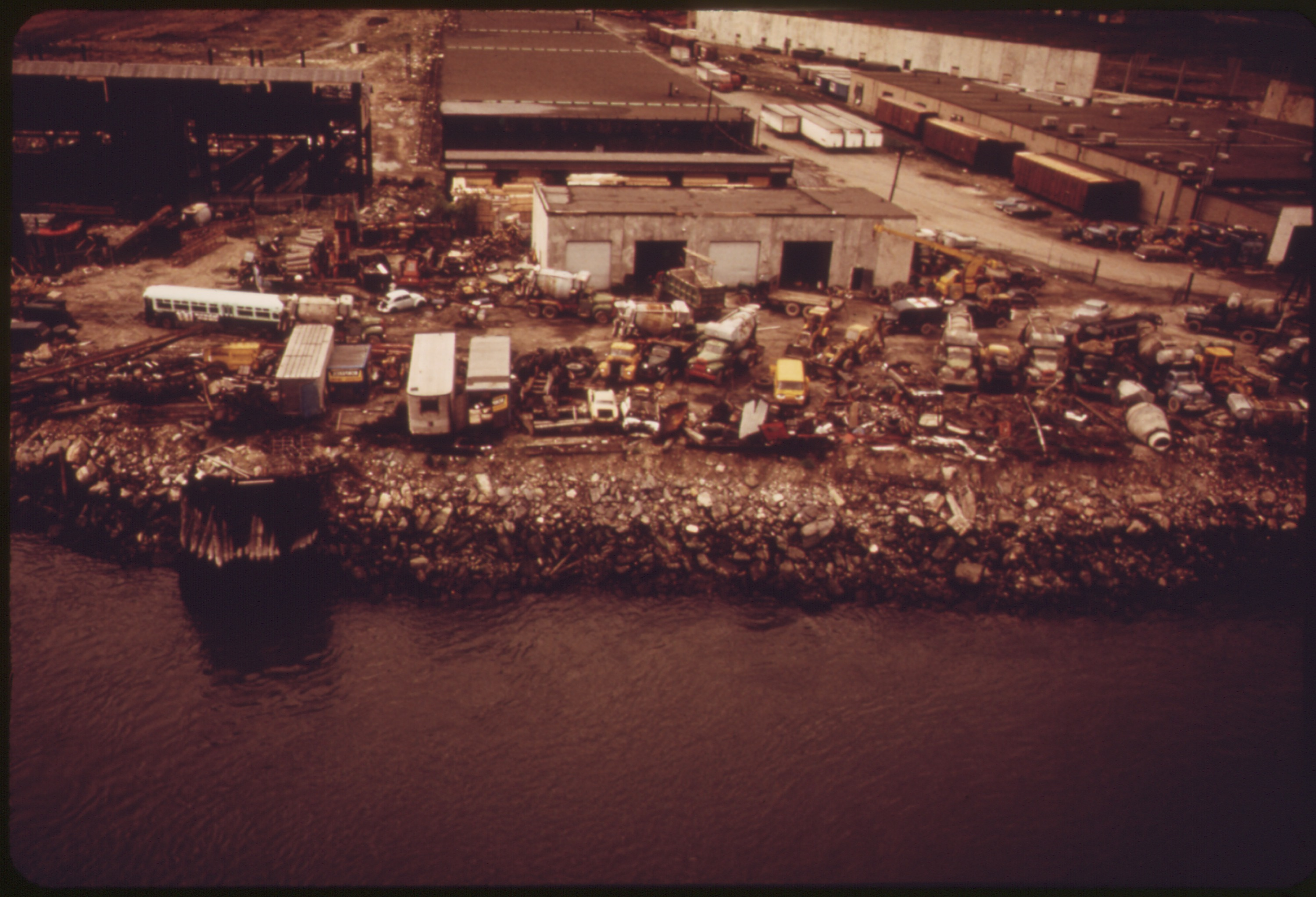
Abandoned industrial facilities on the Hudson River in 1973 (photograph by Chester Higgins Jr.)

=== Hudson River Fisherman's Association (HRFA) ===
The Hudson Valley has long been considered the birthplace of the modern American environmental movement. In the 1960s, a small group of scientists, fishermen, and concerned citizens led by Robert H. Boyle, author of The Hudson River, A Natural and Unnatural History and a senior writer at Sports Illustrated, were determined to reverse the decline of the then-polluted Hudson River by confronting the polluters through advocacy and citizen law enforcement. Eventually, the organization became a powerhouse that has played a leading role in protecting the Hudson and the New York City watershed.

Along with Scenic Hudson and other groups, Boyle was at the forefront of the fight against a Con Edison power plant proposal that would have destroyed Storm King mountain, by the Hudson, warning that water-intake equipment would kill small fish. In so doing, he opened up the courts to environmentalists for the first time in history, establishing the principle that citizens can sue corporations on the basis of potential harm to aesthetic, recreational, or conservational values as well as tangible economic injury.

=== Riverkeeper ===
In 1983, Boyle founded HRFA's Hudson Riverkeeper Fund and launched the 25-foot boat "Riverkeeper" with John Cronin as its skipper, the first riverkeeper in the United States. His tenure began with HRFA's 1983 landmark victory over the Exxon Company, whose oil tankers Cronin caught discharging salt water polluted with petrochemicals from their holds into the Hudson River at Hyde Park, New York and filling them with river water for use in their Aruba refinery and to sell to the island's people as drinking water. Exxon settled the lawsuit out of court, paying $2 million to the state of New York and environmental groups.

In 1984, Robert F. Kennedy, Jr. began volunteering at HRFA. After he was admitted to the New York bar in 1985, Riverkeeper hired him as senior attorney. Kennedy resigned from Riverkeeper in 2017 when he moved to California, writing in his resignation letter that he had co-founded the organization. Riverkeeper President Paul Gallay said of Kennedy, "Nobody has been more important to Riverkeeper than Bobby Kennedy" and credited him with playing a key role in the closure of the Indian Point nuclear plant.

In 1986, HRFA merged with its Hudson Riverkeeper Fund under the name Riverkeeper.

In 2000, a majority of Riverkeeper's board sided with Kennedy who insisted on rehiring William Wegner, a wildlife lecturer and falcon trainer whom Boyle had fired six months earlier after learning that Wegner had been convicted in 1995 for tax fraud, perjury and conspiracy to violate wildlife protection laws. Wegner had recruited and led a team of at least 10 people who smuggled cockatoo eggs, including species considered endangered by Australia, from Australia to the United States over a period of eight years. He served 3.5 years of a 5-year sentence and was hired by Kennedy a few months after his release from prison in 1999. After the board's decision, Boyle, eight of the 22 members of the board, and Riverkeeper's treasurer resigned, saying it was not right for an environmental organization to hire someone convicted of environmental crimes and that it would hurt the organization's fundraising.

== Advocacy and actions ==
=== Consolidated Edison ===
In 1963, Consolidated Edison applied for a license from the Federal Power Commission to build a power station on the Hudson River at Storm King Mountain. Local opponents tried to block the plant. In 1965, the conflict became national news when Boyle wrote about it in an article in Sports Illustrated which also recounted Con Edison dumping dead fish in a landfill near its Indian Point power plant and conspiring with New York's Conservation Department to conceal the mass fish death. The legal battle continued for 17 years. At the end of 1980, Con Edison formally agreed to abandon its Storm King Mountain project, reduce fish kills at its power plants on the Hudson, and establish a $12 million research fund.

The groundbreaking 1965 "Scenic Hudson Decision" by United States Court of Appeals for the Second Circuit for the first time gave citizens without financial interest in the outcome the right (legal standing) to sue for protection of the environment, including "the preservation of natural beauty and national historic sites".

=== Opposition to nuclear power ===
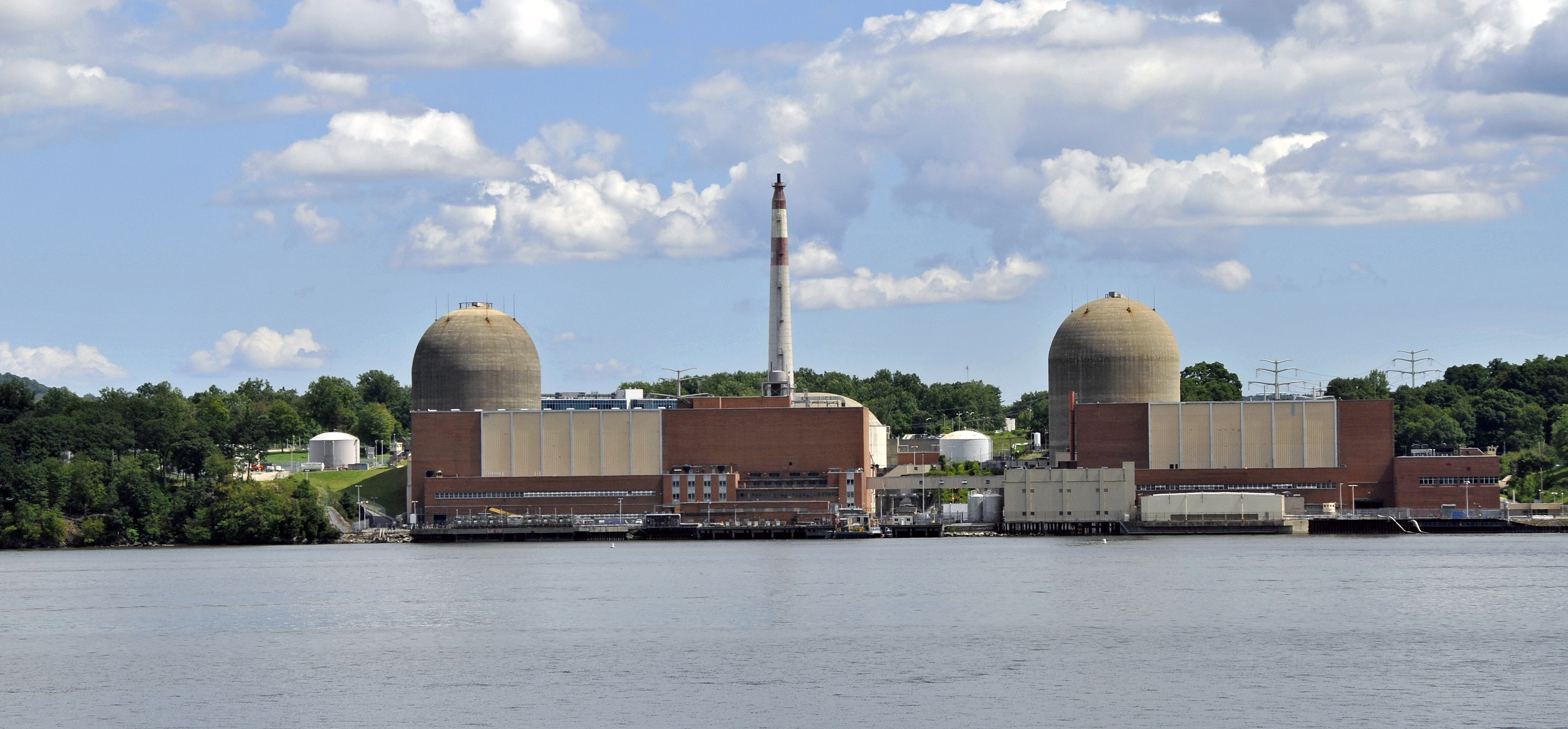
Indian Point Energy Center

Riverkeeper has advocated for the closure of the Indian Point nuclear power plant. Riverkeeper argued that the power plant killed fish by taking in river water for cooling and that the power plant could cause "apocalyptic damage" if attacked by terrorists. Riverkeeper argued that the electricity provided by Indian Point could be fully replaced by renewable energy. After the closure, carbon emissions from electricity generation in New York state increased by 37% and the share of fossil fuel energy in the electric grid increased by 90%.

In August 2023, Governor Kathy Hochul signed the "Save the Hudson" bill into law. Riverkeeper worked in collaboration with others to pass this law. According to the new legislation, it shall be unlawful to discharge any radiological substance into the Hudson River in connection with the decommissioning of a nuclear power plant. This put a stop on Holtec International's (the company decommissioning Indian Point) plan to dump wastewater into the Hudson.

Since October 2023, Indian Point has transferred all spent nuclear fuel to dry cask storage. With this, the risk of an off-site radiological release is significantly lower, and the types of possible accidents significantly fewer.

=== Opposition to hydropower ===
In 2022, Riverkeeper called on New York to reject a $3 billion clean energy plan that would have supplied New York City with hydropower and lessened New York's reliance on fossil fuels. Riverkeeper opposed the hydropower plan, saying "This is not emission-free power." Riverkeeper's position was in stark contrast with many other environmental and clean-energy advocates who argued that the plan was needed to shift the region towards greener energy. Riverkeeper argued that construction of hydropower dams have adverse environmental effects, but the hydropower station that New York was set to use had already been constructed which meant that most of the upfront environmental impact had already occurred.

=== Action on drinking water ===
Riverkeeper became a key player in the 1997 Watershed Memorandum of Agreement, which obligated New York City to spend $1 billion over 10 years to ensure the safety of its water supply and forestalled a federal order that would have forced the city to build a $6 billion filtration plant.

In the 1997 agreement, New York City and communities around the reservoirs in the Catskill Aqueduct system pledged to undertake a series of actions, like installing new equipment in sewage plants to discharge treated wastewater into the reservoirs and buying land to prevent development that could let chemicals enter the water. In return, the New York City Department of Environmental Protection has been able to maintain an unfiltered water supply in the Catskill system, the largest such system in the country.

=== Dam removal ===
By removing old, obsolete dams, Riverkeeper is working to restore life to creeks and streams in the Hudson Valley. There are an estimated 2,000 dams in the Hudson River Estuary between New York City and Albany, NY, many of which are small and obsolete. A challenge for Riverkeeper is convincing people that removing a dam will have payoffs for the fish and the landscape.

Riverkeeper began their dam removal efforts in 2016 when they collaborated with the City of Troy and the Department of Environmental Conservation to help remove a dam in the Wynants Kill. In 2020, Riverkeeper participated in removing the Strooks Felt Dam on Quassaick Creek in Newburgh and another dam on Furnace Brook in Westchester County.

=== Action on water pollution ===
Riverkeeper studies the water quality of the Hudson. The river water is measured for salinity, oxygen, temperature, suspended sediment, chlorophyll and sewage. As of 2008, it is estimated that each year New York City's 460 Combined Sewer Overflows (CSOs) dump more than 27 billion gallons of raw sewage into the river and New York Harbor.

Riverkeeper has filed suits against corporations including Exxon and General Electric. The organization has often worked together with other environmental groups on issues affecting the Hudson, including the longstanding problem of PCBs in the Hudson, which have made the river's fish dangerous to eat.

Riverkeeper also acts on Superfund sites like Gowanus Canal and Newtown Creek. Both waterways were listed as federal Superfund sites in 2010. Work to clean up Gowanus Canal began in 2010, but cleanup in Newtown Creek has been delayed to 2032. The once heavily industrialized Newtown Creek features 11 miles of shoreline that winds along the Queens-Brooklyn border. From 1915 to 1917, the waterway handled as much freight tonnage as the entire Mississippi River. Over 150 years of industrial use have resulted in substantial contamination and impairment of habitat related to releases of hazardous substances and oil. Fish and crab consumption advisories are in place, including a ban on eating fish and crabs by children and women of childbearing age, and other recreational opportunities have also been negatively affected. It is estimated that, over decades, oil refineries on those shores spilled between 17 and 30 million gallons of product into the creek. More than 13 million gallons have been cleaned up so far. Riverkeeper has brought litigation forward, raised public awareness about the oil spill, and worked with state officials to address this contamination.

== See also ==
- List of environmental and conservation organizations in the United States
