= George Alfred Joy Ricker =

American civil engineer

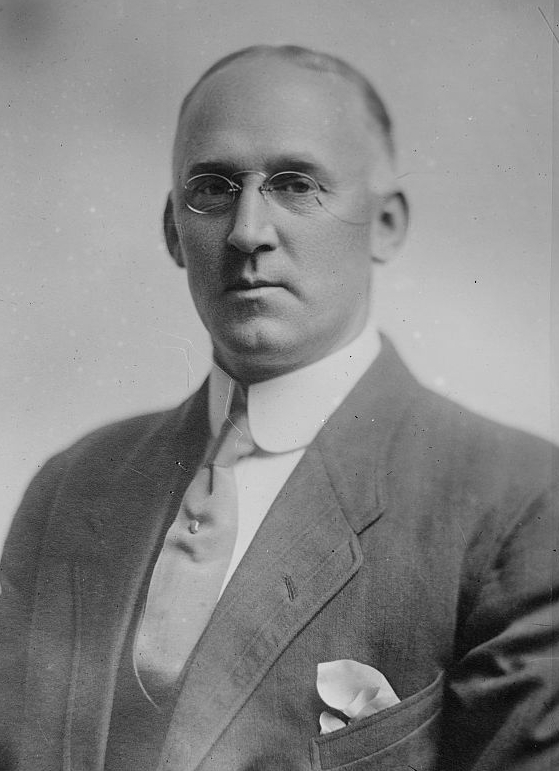

George Alfred Joy Ricker (June 30, 1863 - November 3, 1933) was a civil engineer in Buffalo, New York who built the Niagara Falls Gorge Railway and supervised the construction of the Storm King Highway.

== Biography ==
He was born in Portsmouth, New Hampshire on June 30, 1863. He attended the Massachusetts Institute of Technology. In 1880 he moved to Buffalo, New York with his parents. In 1885, he became an assistant engineer on the Buffalo section of the Erie Railroad. In 1886, he was made assistant civil engineer on the Northern Pacific Railroad at Helena, Montana. He died in 1933.
