= Scenic Hudson Preservation Conference v. Federal Power Commission =

U.S. Circuit Court of Appeals case

- Court: United States Court of Appeals for the Second Circuit
- Full case name: Scenic Hudson Preservation Conference v. Federal Power Commission
- Argued: October 8, 1965
- Decided: December 29, 1965
- Citation: 354 F. 2d 608 (2d Cir. 1965)

Holding
- Court granted standing to Scenic Hudson Preservation Conference on the basis of aesthetic or environmental benefits

Court membership
- Judges sitting: Stanley H. Fuld, J. Edward Lumbard, Sterry R. Waterman, Leonard P. Moore, Henry Friendly, J. Joseph Smith, Irving Kaufman, Paul R. Hays, Robert P. Anderson

Laws applied
- Standing, §10(a) & §313(b) Federal Power Act

Location of Storm King Mountain in New York State.

Scenic Hudson Preservation Conference v. Federal Power Commission, 354 F.2d 608 (2d Cir. 1965) is a United States Second Circuit Court of Appeals case in which a public group of citizens, the Scenic Hudson Preservation Conference, organized and initiated legal action after the Federal Power Commission approved plans for Consolidated Edison to construct a power plant on Storm King Mountain, New York. The federal regulatory agency had denied that the environmental group could bring action, but the court disagreed, ruling that Scenic Hudson had legal standing because of their "special interest in aesthetic, conservational, and recreational aspects" of the mountain.

In order to insure that the Federal Power Commission will adequately protect the public interest in the aesthetic, conservational, and recreational aspects of power development, those who by their activities and conduct have exhibited a special interest in such areas must be held to be included in the class of 'aggrieved' parties under s. 313 (b). We hold that the Federal Power Act gives petitioners a legal right to protect their special interests.

— Circuit Judge Paul R. Hays, in the court's decision for Scenic Hudson Preservation Conference v. Federal Power Commission

This was the first decision of a court to grant standing on such terms, and established a precedent to allow similar public-based environmental groups to engage in legal processes. As Justice Hays stated, "the cost of a project is only one of several factors to be considered" in addition to "the preservation of natural beauty and national historic sites" as a basic concern. This 1965 ruling helped to establish the legitimacy of environmental issues and paved the way for lawyers and the courts to play a significant role in all manner of land-use and environmental battles.

== Background ==
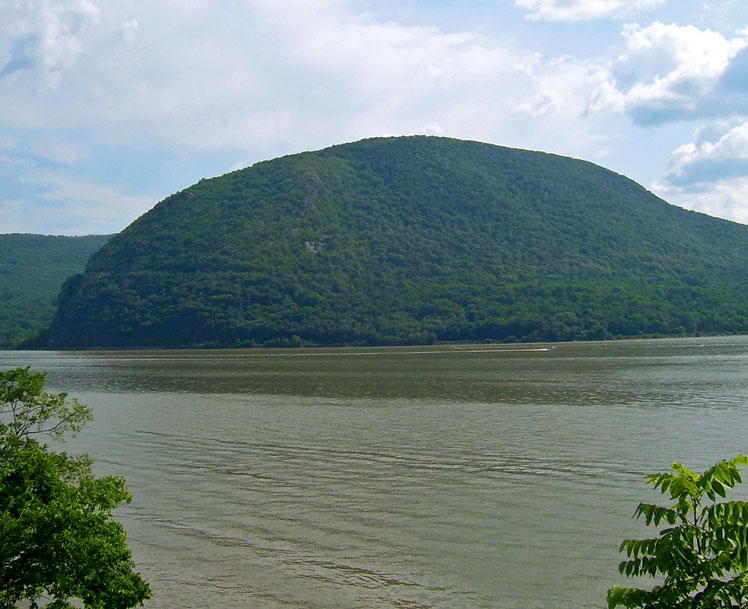
Storm King from the Breakneck Ridge train station across the Hudson

This case is part of a 17-year (1963–1981) dispute. In September, 1962, Consolidated Edison announced plans to build the country's largest pumped-storage, 2,000-megawatt (MW) hydroelectric power plant on Storm King Mountain at a cost of $234 million. The proposed project also required that Con Edison buy about three hundred acres of the Black Rock Forest owned by Harvard University, which was unwilling to sell. In response to the proposal, by November 1963 citizens had formed the Scenic Hudson Preservation Conference to provide a stronger unified voice against the project. Despite its opposition, the Federal Power Commission granted Consolidated Edison the right to proceed. The commission's decision was immediately appealed and the matter was sent to the U.S. Second Circuit Court of Appeals. The timeline below provides a more thorough context of the different cases and significant decisions.

== Legal framework ==
=== Parties involved ===
Scenic Hudson Preservation Conference was a collection of concerned citizens and other local interests. Several towns joined Scenic Hudson as plaintiffs. The towns were located along both banks of the Hudson River within the vicinity of Storm King Mountain. These surrounding local governments felt as though the development of the storage facility along with the additional transmission lines would adversely affect them. Among them were Phillipstown, Putnam Valley, Cortlandt, and Yorktown, all on the opposite bank and concerned about the visual impact of the project.

Consolidated Edison was, and as of 2025 still is, a large investor-owned utility in New York. It was seeking a reliable source of energy to meet the needs of a then growing population.

=== Appeals court ===
This case was tried in the U.S. Court of Appeals, 2nd Circuit. It was argued on October 8, 1965, and decided on December 29, 1965. The case was remanded to the Federal Power Commission in the lower courts. The decision was the beginning of what was to become environmental law. The case was presented before Chief Judge J. Edward Lumbard and Circuit Judges Sterry R. Waterman and Hays. The innovative decision was written by Justice Hays.

=== Issues ===
The main issue presented in this case is whether aesthetic harm can suffice as an injury-in-fact in order to establish standing. The "injury in fact" test requires both an "injury to a cognizable interest" and that "the party seeking review be himself among the injured."

The Storm King project was to be located in an area of unique beauty and major historical significance. The highlands and gorge of the Hudson offer one of the finest pieces of river scenery in the world. The great German traveler Baedeker called it "finer than the Rhine." Petitioners' contention that the Commission must take these factors into consideration in evaluating the Storm King project is justified by the history of the Federal Power Act. Prior to this case, aesthetics were not considered worthy of standing in court. Environmental groups had to demonstrate a harm to a person or people (typically economic harm) before they could be allowed to challenge development in court and be heard.

The New York Court of Appeals set aside the Storm King license and remanded to the Federal Power Commission in a decision marking the birth of environmental law. The court stated that "The Commission's renewed proceedings must include as a basic concern the preservation of natural beauty and national historic sites, keeping in mind that in our affluent society, the cost of a project is only one of several factors to be considered." In addition, the court ruled that "On remand, the Commission should take the whole fisheries question into consideration before deciding whether the Storm King Project is to be licensed."

This also helped to establish some of the largest environmental organizations today. See "Catalyst for other action," below.

== Opinion of the Court ==
Presented by Justice Hays on behalf of Chief Justice Lumbard and Justice Waterman.

=== Standing ===
In United States law, the Supreme Court of the United States has stated, "In essence the question of standing is whether the litigant is entitled to have the court decide the merits of the dispute or of particular issues."

This case was significant because the court decided the Scenic Hudson Preservation Conference was an aggrieved party under § 313(a) of the Federal Power Act and thus "has standing to challenge the Commission's order." They were determined to be an "aggrieved party" because of their "special interest in aesthetic, conservational, and recreational aspects of power development."

This was the first example of granting standing on the basis of aesthetic or environmental benefits.

=== Commission ===
The Second Circuit Court of Appeals held the following:

- Commission violated requirements of §10(a) and §313(b) of Federal Power Act by failing to compile record adequate to support its findings and by failing to consider alternatives to the proposed project, including no project at all.
- Commission failed to weigh adequately the need to preserve an area of unique beauty and major historical significance for "recreational purposes" as expressly mandated by Act.
- Commission illegally failed to consider such alternatives as a gas turbine system, an interconnection with other systems, or a combination of the two.
- Commission illegally failed to consider the possibility that no device could adequately protect fish and fish larvae in the project area and further failed to consider the desirability of running segments of the transmission lines underground.

== Remand ==
The licensing order of March 9 and the two orders of May 6 were set aside, and the case was remanded for further Federal Power Commission hearings.

== Judicial timeline ==
The Storm King Decision incorporates 15 years of legal challenges, beginning with the first case in 1965. Below is the timeline:

- 1963: Initial proposal for Storm King plant is developed, Scenic Hudson Preservation Conference established
- 1964: Federal Power Commission (FPC) holds hearings on the proposed plant. They grant Consolidated Edison the license to build plant
- 1965: First case: Consolidated Edison Vs. Scenic Hudson Preservation Conference, Towns of Phillipsville, Putnam Valley, Cortland. Court remands case to lower court and acknowledges the aesthetic and historical importance of Storm King Mountain and grants standing to a citizen environmental group.
- 1966–1967: The remanded FPC hearings take place. There are over 19,000 pages of testimony. Many additional environmental studies are presented including studies showing the predicted number of fish kills from the plant.
- 1968: Almost one year after the hearings ended, the FPC recommends that the license be granted for the Storm King Project.
- 1968–1970: Alternative sites and routes are examined by FPC. They determined that the alternate site is a major hazard to the New York City aqueduct. This eliminates the possibility of the alternate location. The FPC again examines the potential of the Storm King Mountain Site. In August 1970 the FPC re-licensed Storm King.
- 1971: Scenic Hudson, the Hudson River Fisherman's Association (now Riverkeeper), The City of New York, the Palisades Park Commission and others appealed the Federal Power Commission decision. The Court upholds the FPC licensing decision in a two-to-one vote. The court later split four-to-four on reconsideration. (453 F. 2d 463 (2d Cir. 1971), cert. denied 407 U.S. 926 (1972)).
- 1973: Once again, Scenic Hudson and the Hudson River Fisherman's Association petitioned the Federal Power Commission to reconsider the Storm King license. They allege that the fish studies used in the 1970 license granting were inaccurate. The study did not consider that the Hudson is a tidal river and therefore underestimated impact to certain fish. The Federal Power Commission later rejected the Scenic Hudson and Hudson River Fisherman's Association Petitions. (49 FPC 1227 (1973)).
- 1973: Scenic Hudson and Hudson River Fisherman's Association bring suit against the US Army Corps of Engineers in federal district court to stop Consolidated Edison from dumping rock excavated from the Storm King project into the Hudson River. They argued that a Corps of Engineers permit was required. Scenic Hudson Preservation Conference v. Callaway, 370 F. Supp. 162 (S.D.N.Y. 1973), aff'd 499 f.2d 127 (2d Cir. 1974).
- 1976: NY City Attorney General and some FPC staff join Scenic Hudson and Hudson River Fisherman's Association in petitioning the Federal Power Commission to restart hearings on the Storm King license. This time they include economics in the argument along with changed circumstances and environmental concerns.
- 1980: Scenic Hudson and Consolidated Edison reached a settlement in the Storm King case. Consolidated Edison agreed to terminate the Storm King plans, reduce fish kills at some of its power plants on the Hudson. They also established a research fund for the Hudson River. The surrender was approved by Federal Energy Regulatory Commission (FERC) in 1981.

== Catalyst for other action ==
The Court's decision to grant standing to the Scenic Hudson Preservation Conference, a conservation group with local members, established an important legal precedent for similar groups to be able to take legal action to protect the public interest. This case has been attributed as the birth of environmental law, which is now so firmly established, it is taught as a separate branch of legal studies at most law schools today.

=== Related cases ===
This case sets a precedent for "attainment of standing to sue than for justiciability of aesthetic issues on their merits." Within each case, it is important that aesthetic conditions be specifically mentioned within the applicable statutes. In the case of Scenic Hudson Preservation Conference v. Federal Power Commission case, this was the Federal Power Act.

- Izaak Walton League of America v. St. Clair (1970): in response to mineral claims in the Boundary Waters Canoe Area.
- Citizens to Preserve Overton Park, Inc. v. Volpe (1971): lawsuit in response to a proposed highway corridor through a municipal park. This case contained environmental issues with aesthetic factors, but also had particular statutory language examined.
- U.S. v. Students Challenging Regulatory Agency Procedures (SCRAP) (1973): students found to have alleged individual standing because assigning higher transport tariffs would encourage use of raw materials over recycled materials. Though the students had standing, they eventually lost the case.
- Parker v. US (1971): lawsuit in response to a proposed forest timber sale. This case contained environmental issues with aesthetic factors, but also had particular statutory language examined.
- Sierra Club v. Morton (1972): The key issue in the case was whether the permitted development would cause the Sierra Club sufficient injury to give them standing to sue to block the permit. The Supreme Court held that the Sierra Club, in its corporate capacity, lacked standing, but that it may sue on behalf of any of its members who had individual standing because the government action affected their aesthetic or recreational interests. However, the Sierra Club had failed to state in its complaint that any of its members had ever visited Mineral King, even though several members had used it for recreational purposes and even owned property in the nearby area, and so it lost.
- Friends of the Earth v. Armstrong (1973).

=== Policy change ===
Though a powerful tool for environmental action, private litigation does not replace the proactive approach of states and the federal government establishing environmental standards.

=== Environmental organizations ===
The Natural Resources Defense Council started in 1970 from a partnership including attorneys of the Scenic Hudson Preservation Conference, led by Stephen Duggan.

== See also ==
- Clearwater Festival
- New York energy law
- David Sive
- Pete Seeger
