= David Sive =

American lawyer

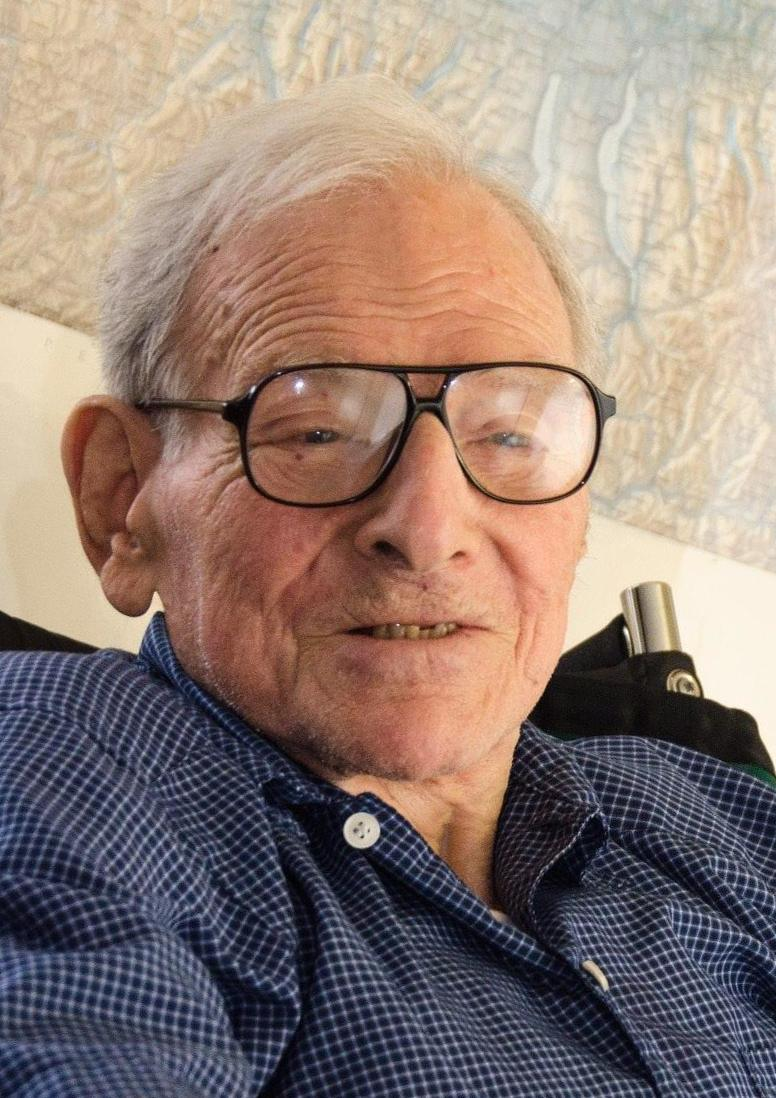
- David Sive in 2012
- Born: September 22, 1922; Brooklyn, New York, U.S.
- Died: March 12, 2014 (aged 91); West Orange, New Jersey, U.S.
- Education: Brooklyn College (BA); Columbia University (LLB)
- Occupations: Environmentalist, lawyer, professor

David Sive (September 22, 1922 – March 12, 2014) was an American attorney, environmentalist, and professor of environmental law, who has been recognized as a pioneer in the field of United States environmental law.

== Early life and education ==
Sive was born in Brooklyn, New York, on September 22, 1922, the son of Abraham Sive and Rebecca (née Schwartz) Sive. As a teenager, his growing love for the outdoors and fascination with the American wilderness, as well as his interest in the writings of Thoreau, Emerson, and Wordsworth, led him to a lifelong passion for the natural environment, to wilderness preservation and environmental protection. Hiking and camping expeditions during his college years, to the Catskill and Adirondack Mountains of New York State, foreshadowed his advocacy in later years for the “forever wild” clause in the New York State constitution and his activism for environmental preservation in his home state and throughout the U.S.

Sive graduated from Brooklyn College with a degree in political science in 1943. He had enlisted in the U.S. Army in 1942 and was called up in the spring of 1943 shortly before his college graduation. He served in the front lines in Europe, including in the Battle of the Bulge, was wounded twice and awarded the Purple Heart with Oak Leaf Cluster. Convalescence at a U.S. Army hospital in Devon, England gave him further opportunity to study the verse of William Wordsworth.

Sive enrolled at Columbia Law School following his discharge from the Army in the fall of 1945. A Harlan Fiske Stone scholar, he received the Bachelor of Laws degree in 1948.

== Legal career ==
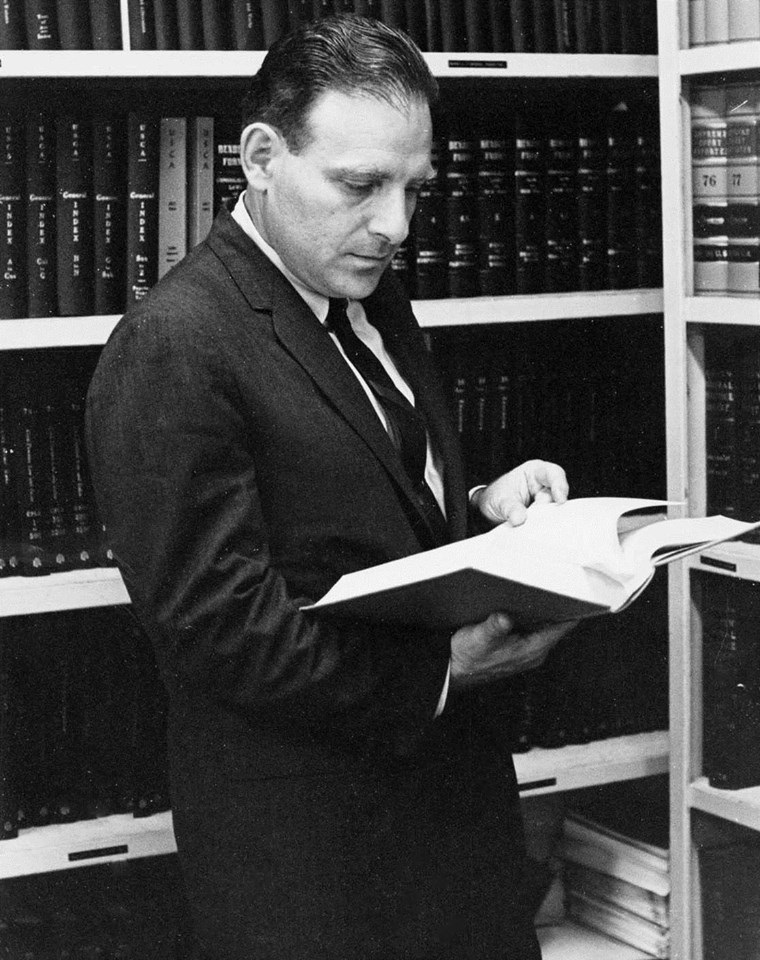
Sive in his office (1964)

One of Sive's first lawsuits that gained public attention was David Sive v. Louis Newman (1951). In this case, Sive argued that the owner of a car that is double-parked is liable for damage incurred to a car traveling from the curb to the normal traffic stream. The argument was upheld.

As a partner in the firm Winer, Neuberger & Sive, founded in New York City in 1962, and chairman of the Atlantic Chapter of the Sierra Club in the 1960s, Sive developed his reputation as an expert litigator and fierce defender of the environment. The successor firm, Sive, Paget & Riesel, remains a leader in environmental law.

Sive lost one of the earliest cases under the National Environmental Policy Act, Concerned About Trident v. Schlesinger, 400 F.Supp. 454 (D.D.C. 1975). Among the many landmark cases Sive argued were Scenic Hudson Preservation Conference v. Federal Power Commission (1971). The Storm King case accorded standing to a citizens group without financial interest in the proposed power project and ordered the defendant to explore alternatives. Con Ed eventually abandoned the project. Other notable cases included Committee for Nuclear Responsibility, Inc. v. Schlesinger (1971), argued before the U.S. Supreme Court, which attracted wide media attention to the issue of governmental underground nuclear bomb testing and its potential environmental effects at Amchitka Island, Alaska; Concerned About Trident, Inc. v. Rumsfeld (1976), which established that strategic military decisions are not exempt from compliance with the National Environmental Policy Act; Mohonk Trust v. Board of Assessors of Town of Gardiner (1979), a real property case that on appeal established that land owned by a trust for environmental preservation and use could be exempt from real property taxes; Citizens Committee for the Hudson River v. Volpe et al. (1970), which stopped the construction of a proposed expressway on fill to be placed in the Hudson River.

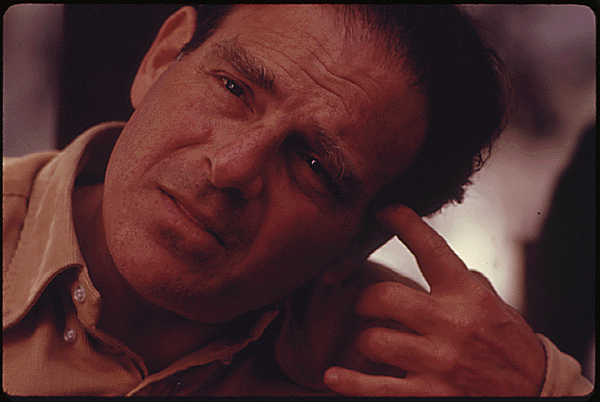
David Sive at a board meeting for the Concerned about Trident case. (June, 1974)

== Academic experience ==
Sive taught litigation and environmental law for many years at Columbia Law School, and also taught environmental law as a visiting faculty member at the Universities of Michigan, Wisconsin, Indiana, Utah, Hawaii, Colorado, and Washington. He joined the faculty of Pace University Law School in 1995; the Pace Law Library houses the David Sive Manuscript Collection, for students and scholars of environmental law.

== Environmental organizations ==
Sive was a leader and activist with a number of environmental organizations. He was a founding member of Natural Resources Defense Council, the nation’s leading public interest law firm in this specialty, and of the Environmental Law Institute. Sive was also among the lawyers representing the Sierra Club when the Internal Revenue Service abruptly ended the Club's tax-exempt status in 1966. That move had the quite unintended effect of turning Sierra Club into the nationally known organization it remains and vastly increasing its membership. Sive subsequently served on the Club's Board of Directors. Sive was a founder of Environmental Advocates of New York, a contributing founder of Friends of the Earth, a member of the board of directors of the Hudson Valley Institute and Scenic Hudson, New York Lawyers for the Public Interest, while serving on the board of directors of the Association of the Bar of the City of New York; and a multi-year chair of the annual ALI-ABA Conference on Environmental Law.

== Honors and awards ==
He was the recipient of many awards, from the Environmental Law Institute, the New York State Environmental Planning Lobby, the Sierra Club, the New York State Bar Association, The Nature Conservancy, the New York State Parks and Conservation Association, the Natural Resources Defense Council, and others. He was a prolific author and lecturer on the topics of environmental law and litigation.
