= Storm King Mountain (New York) =

Mountain in New York, United States

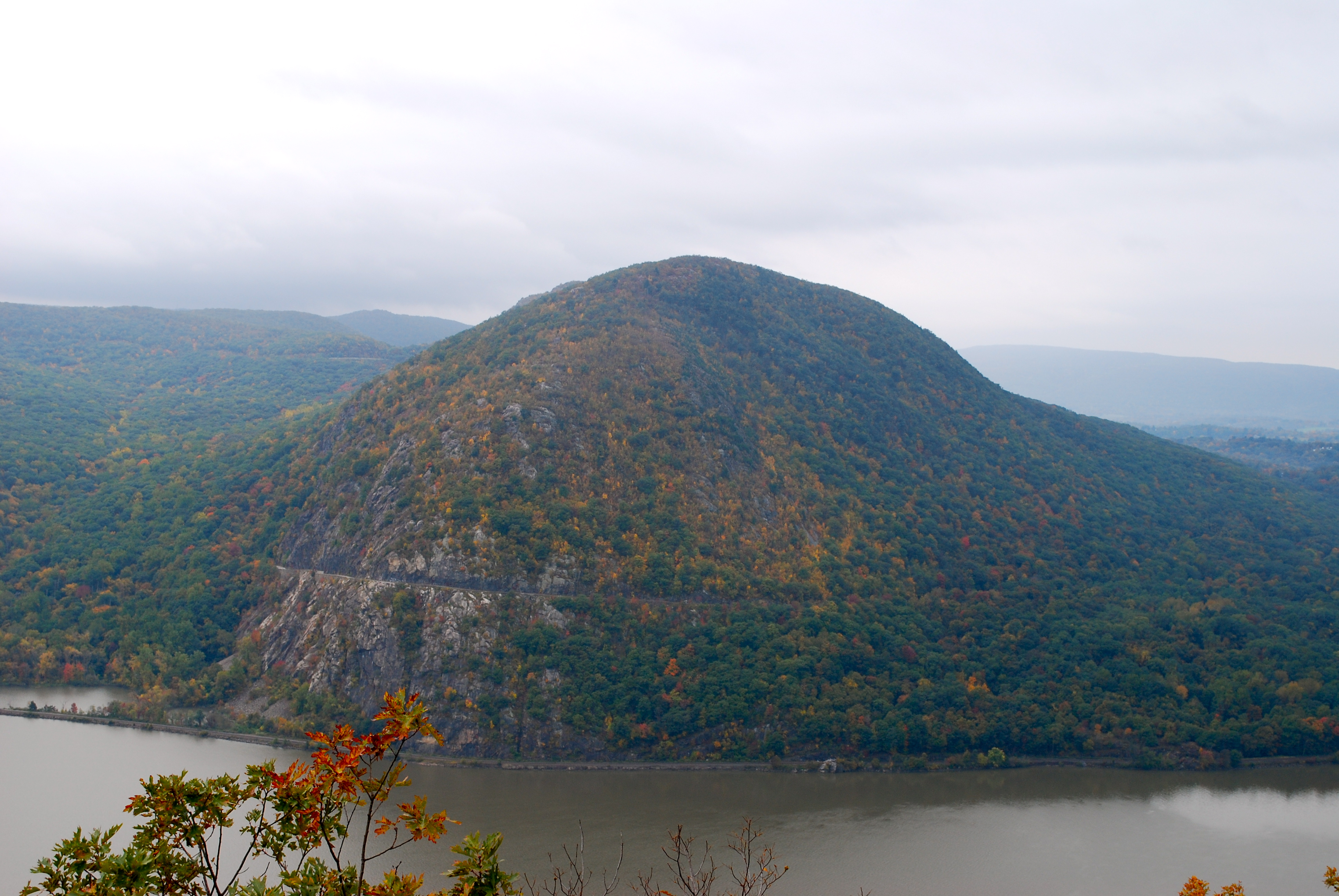
- Storm King and New York State Route 218 as seen from atop Breakneck Ridge

Highest point
- Elevation: 1340+ feet (408+ m)
- Prominence: 100 ft (30 m)
- Coordinates: 41°25′58″N 73°59′41″W

Geography
- Location within New York Location within the United States
- Location: Orange County, New York, U.S.
- Parent range: Hudson Highlands
- Topo map: USGS West Point

Climbing
- Easiest route: Trail hike

Storm King Mountain is a mountain on the west bank of the Hudson River just south of Cornwall-on-Hudson, New York. Together with Breakneck Ridge on the opposite bank of the river it forms "Wey-Gat" or Wind Gate, the picturesque northern narrows of the Hudson Highlands. Its distinctive curved ridge is the most prominent aspect of the view south down Newburgh Bay, from Newburgh, Beacon, and the Newburgh-Beacon Bridge. It can also be seen by southbound travelers on nearby sections of the New York State Thruway. This view was a popular subject for early artists of the Hudson River School.

While thought of as the highest point in the area, its summit reaching approximately 1,340 feet (410 m) above sea level, the eastern summit known officially as Butter Hill is actually higher, with an elevation of 1,380 feet (420 m).

== Name ==
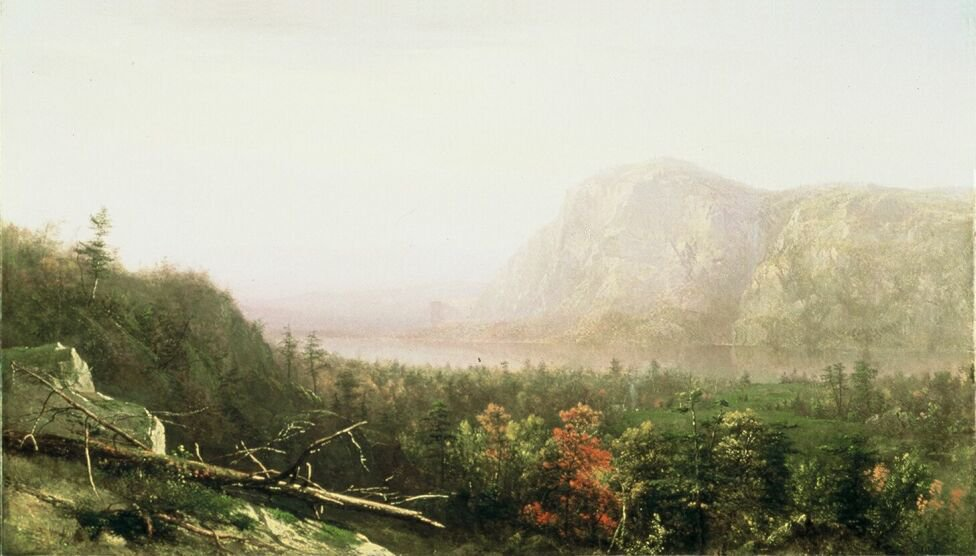
Storm King, by Homer Dodge Martin (1836 ..1897), in the style of the Hudson River School.

During his initial voyage up the river, Henry Hudson and his crew named the mountain Klinkesberg, due to its wrinkled rock cliffs near the river.

Later, the early Dutch colonists of the region referred to the mountain simply as "Boterberg" (Butter Hill, since the mountain looked like a lump of butter; the English translation was later the common name for the mountain). During the middle of the 19th century, writer Nathaniel Parker Willis, who had become a resident in the region, proposed the name Storm King:

The tallest mountain is ... looked upon as the most sure foreteller of a storm. When the white cloud-beard descends upon his breast in the morning ... there is sure to be a rain-storm before night. Standing aloft before other mountains in the chain, this sign is peculiar to him. He seems the monarch, and this seems his stately ordering of a change in the weather. Should not STORM-KING, then, be his proper title?

The section of New York State Route 218 that winds around the eastern slope of the mountain overlooking the River Hudson was originally named the Storm King Highway. That name is often used presently for the four-lane section of U.S. Route 9W to the west, with Route 218 referred to as the Old Storm King Highway.

== History ==
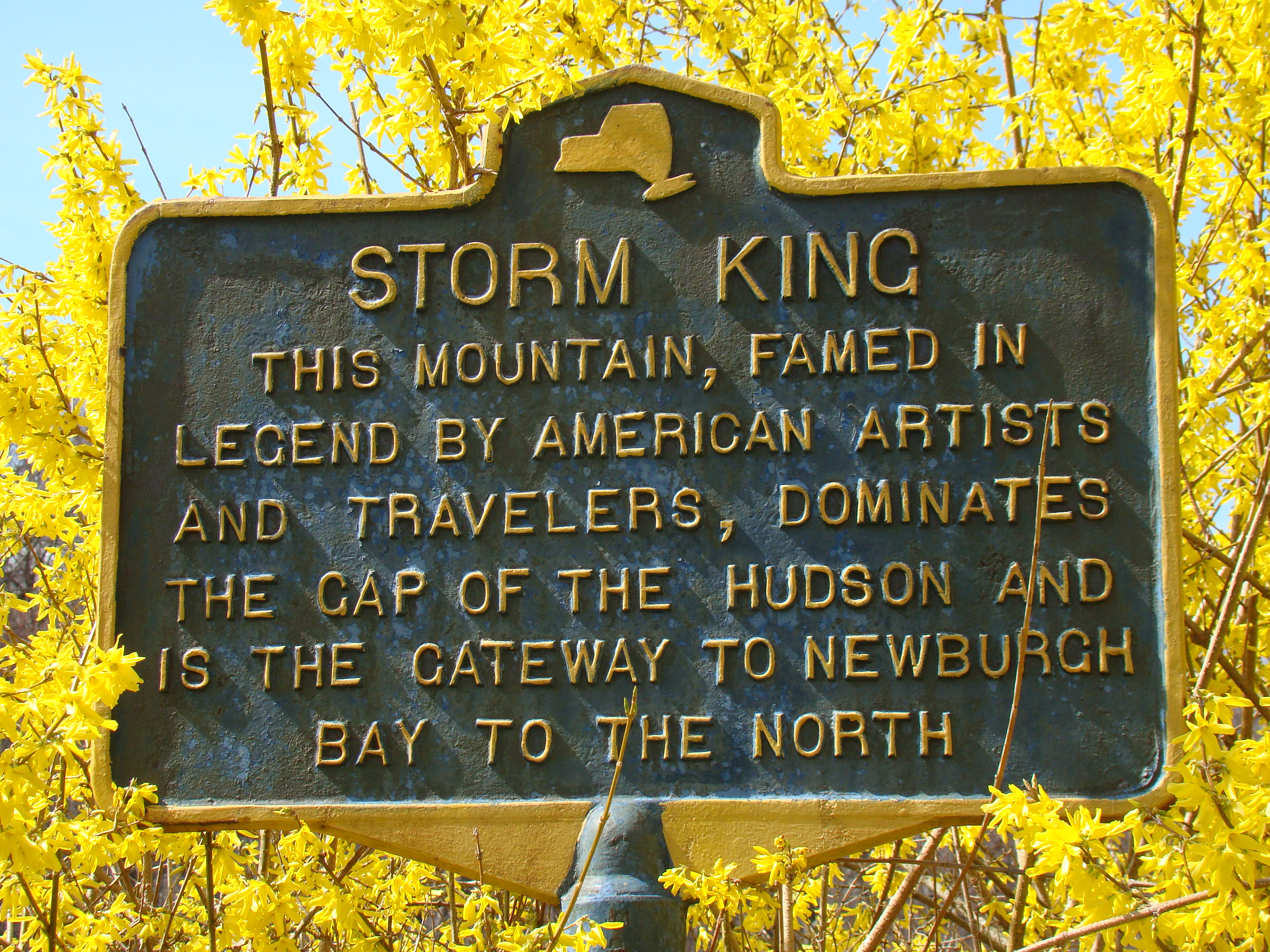
Historical marker near Rte 293 adjacent the West Point golf course.

During 1962 the mountain became the topic of an environmental controversy when local activists formed the Scenic Hudson Preservation Coalition (known presently simply as Scenic Hudson) to fight plans by utility Consolidated Edison to cut away part of the mountain near the river and build a pumped storage hydro-electric plant complete with transmission lines across the Hudson River for an ambitious power generating scheme which would also have entailed creating a reservoir in much of what is now Black Rock Forest. In a lawsuit brought by the coalition, Scenic Hudson Preservation Conference v. Federal Power Commission, a judge ruled for the first time that environmentalists had standing to challenge executive branch decisions in federal court. During 1979 Con Edison finally abandoned even a greatly reduced version of the project, and settled another lawsuit against their Indian Point facility by agreeing to regulate the operation of their Hudson River power plants so as to minimize the number of fish they killed and endow the Hudson River Foundation with $12 million.

After forest fires on the mountain during the dry summer of 1999, unexploded ordnance remaining from 19th century artillery tests and training at the nearby United States Military Academy was discovered in some areas close to the trails. As a result, hiking on the mountain was prohibited until October 2002, when authorities could be sure it had been removed safely.

On February 20, 2011, a NYPD helicopter rescued two Fourth Class "plebes" from the United States Military Academy nearby, who had stranded themselves 500 feet up on the southern cliff face while rappelling, when a New York State Police chopper proved unable to complete the task.

== Hiking ==
The mountain is a major part of Storm King State Park. With wide views of the river and areas surrounding, both Storm King and Butter Hill summits are popular with hikers. The orange-blazed unnamed connector trail, leading to the yellow-blazed Stillman Trail, most often accessed at a parking area on U.S. Route 9W, offers an immediate and steep climb up Butter Hill followed by a longer and more relaxing hike to the summit of Storm King.

Although attempted infrequently and not permitted by the park authorities, there are documented technical rock climbing routes above the river, as well as ice climbing, when conditions are favorable.

== Gallery ==
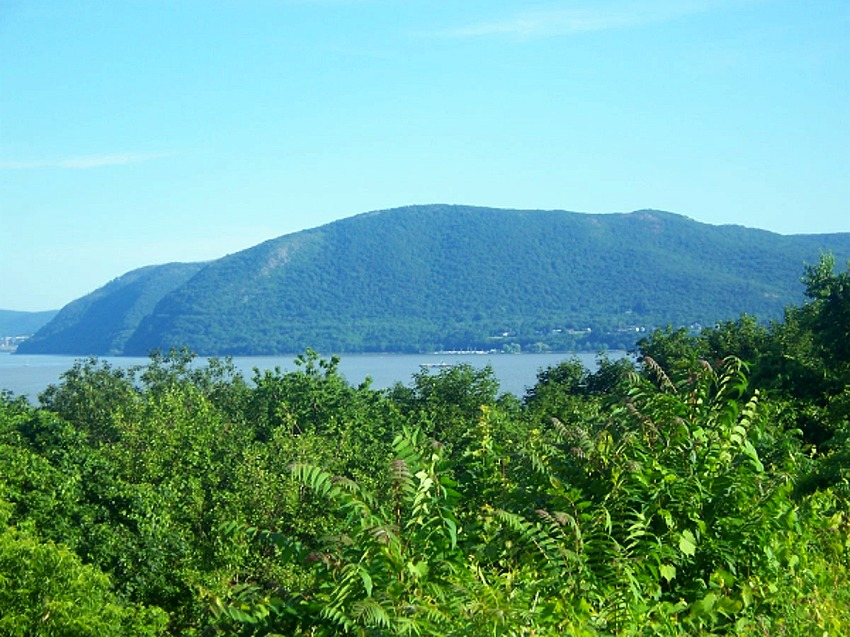
Storm King and Butter Hill from Newburgh, New York

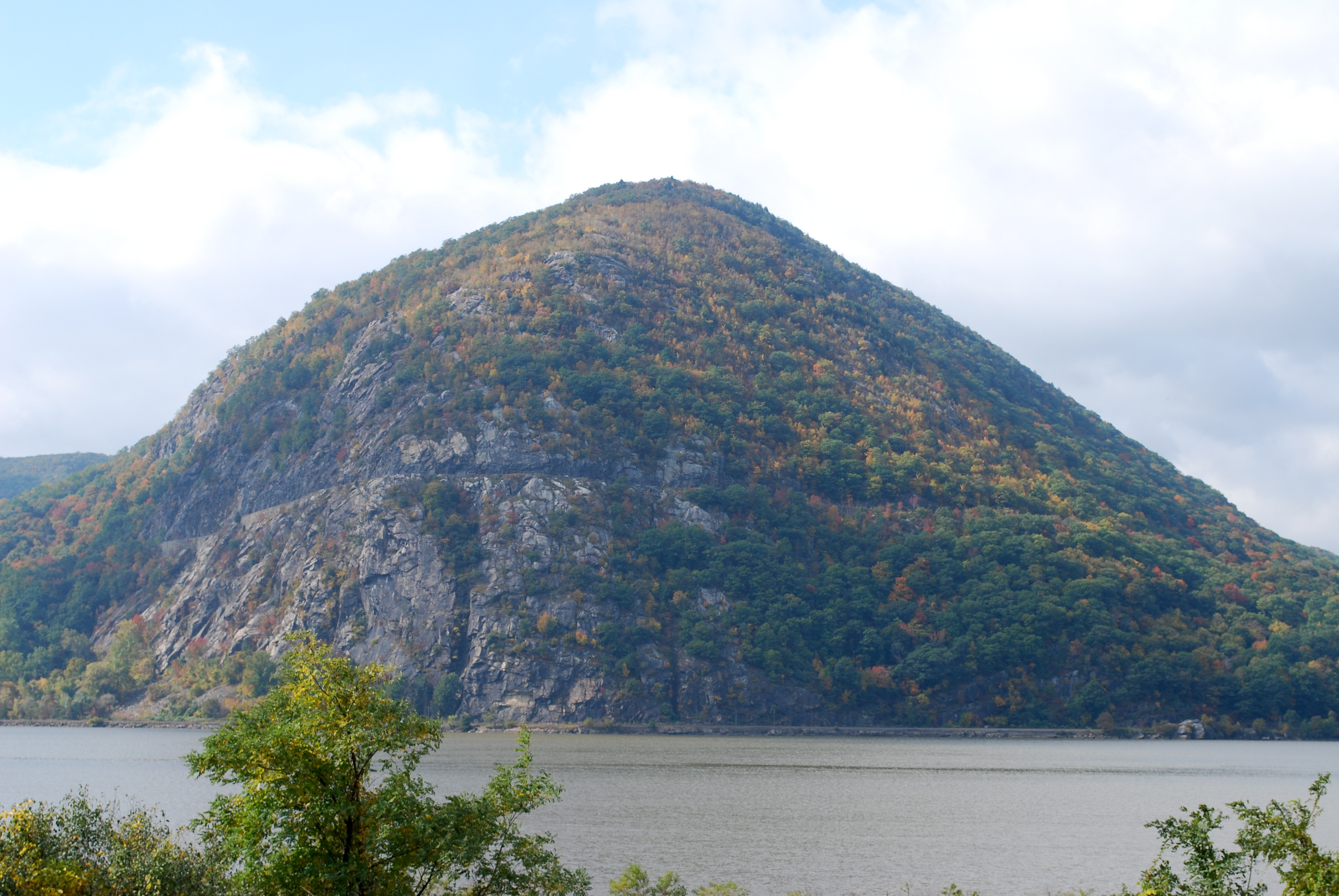
Seen looking west from the base of Breakneck Ridge

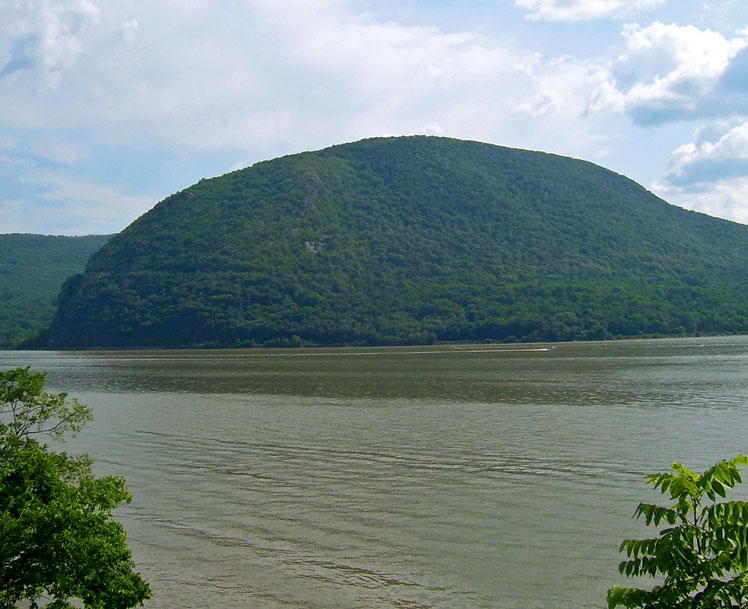
Storm King from the Breakneck Ridge train station across the Hudson River

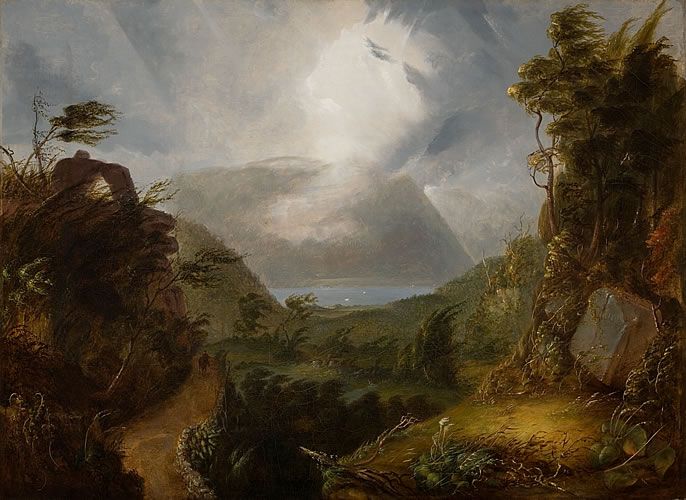
Thomas Cole, Storm King of the Hudson, 1825-1827

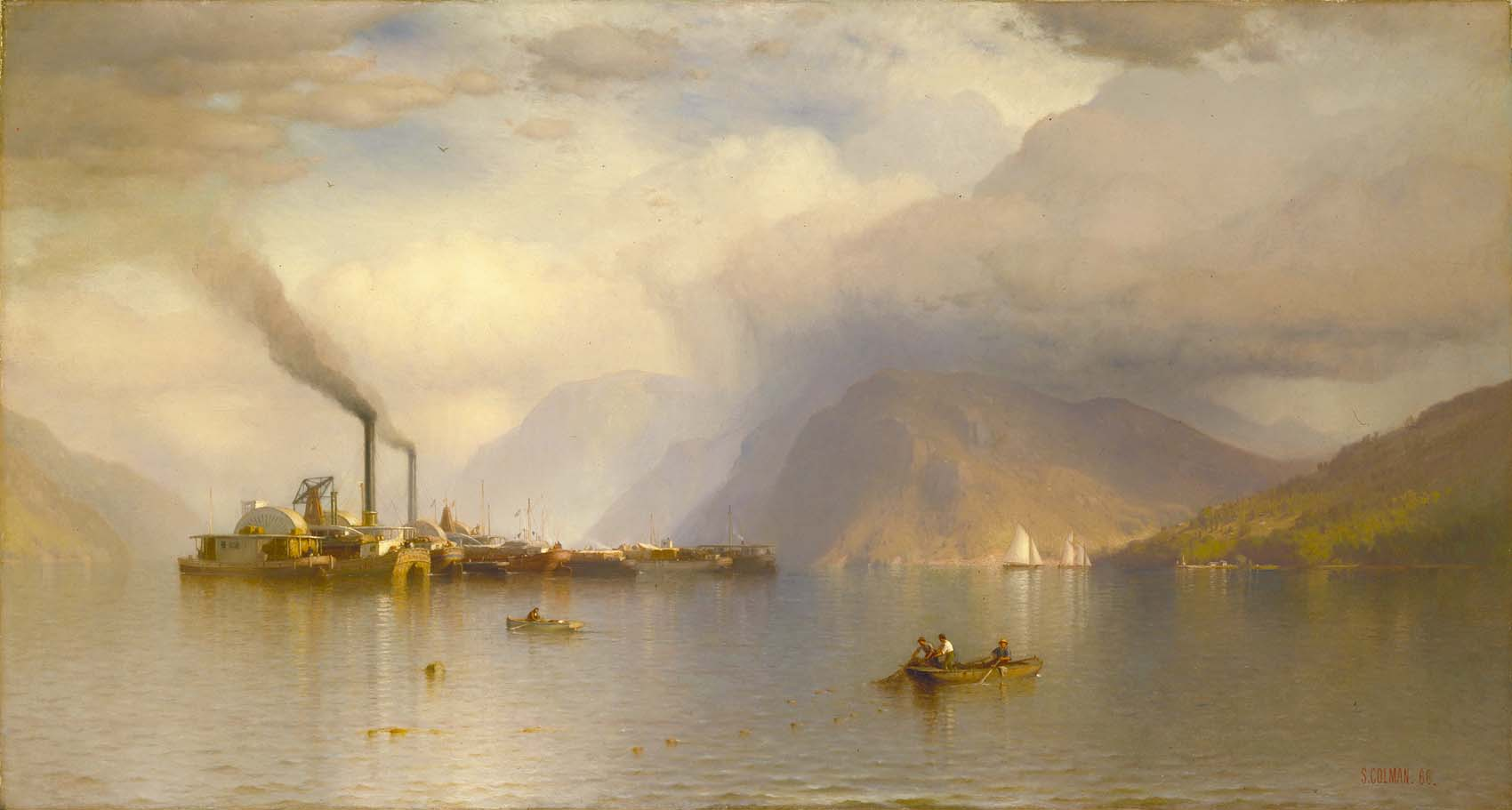
Samuel Colman, Storm King on the Hudson, 1866

== See also ==
- Bull Hill
- David Sive
