= Columbia Land Conservancy =

American nonprofit organization

The Columbia Land Conservancy is an environmental nonprofit organization and land trust located in Columbia County, New York, in the greater Hudson Valley. Its mission is to conserve farmland, forests, wildlife habitat, and rural character of Columbia County, connecting people to the land.

== Public Conservation Areas ==
The Columbia Land Conservancy has facilitated the protection of, and continues to maintain, a number of notable Public Conservation Areas in Columbia County. These include: the Borden's Pond Conservation Area and Ooms Conservation Area in Chatham, Drowned Lands Swamp Conservation Area and Overmountain Conservation Area in Ancram, Greenport Conservation Area in Greenport, Hand Hollow Conservation Area in New Lebanon, Harris Conservation Area in Austerlitz, New York, High Falls Conservation Area in Philmont, Schor Conservation Area in Canaan, and Siegel-Kline Kill Conservation Area in Ghent. The parks are all open year-round and free of charge, and some allow regulated fishing and hunting.

== Education and Outreach ==
CLC works with schools to provide environmental education programs. They also offer free events open to the public. As a member of the Coalition of Living Museums, CLC values outdoor education. New York State considers CLC as a museum with a Living Collection represented by our lands with interpretation through signage.

== Land Protection ==
CLC works with landowners to protect their land with conservation easements. To date, the organization has protected more than 30,000 acres of land. CLC coordinates the Berkshire-Taconic Regional Conservation Partnership, which protects land throughout the northeast.

== Farmland conservation ==
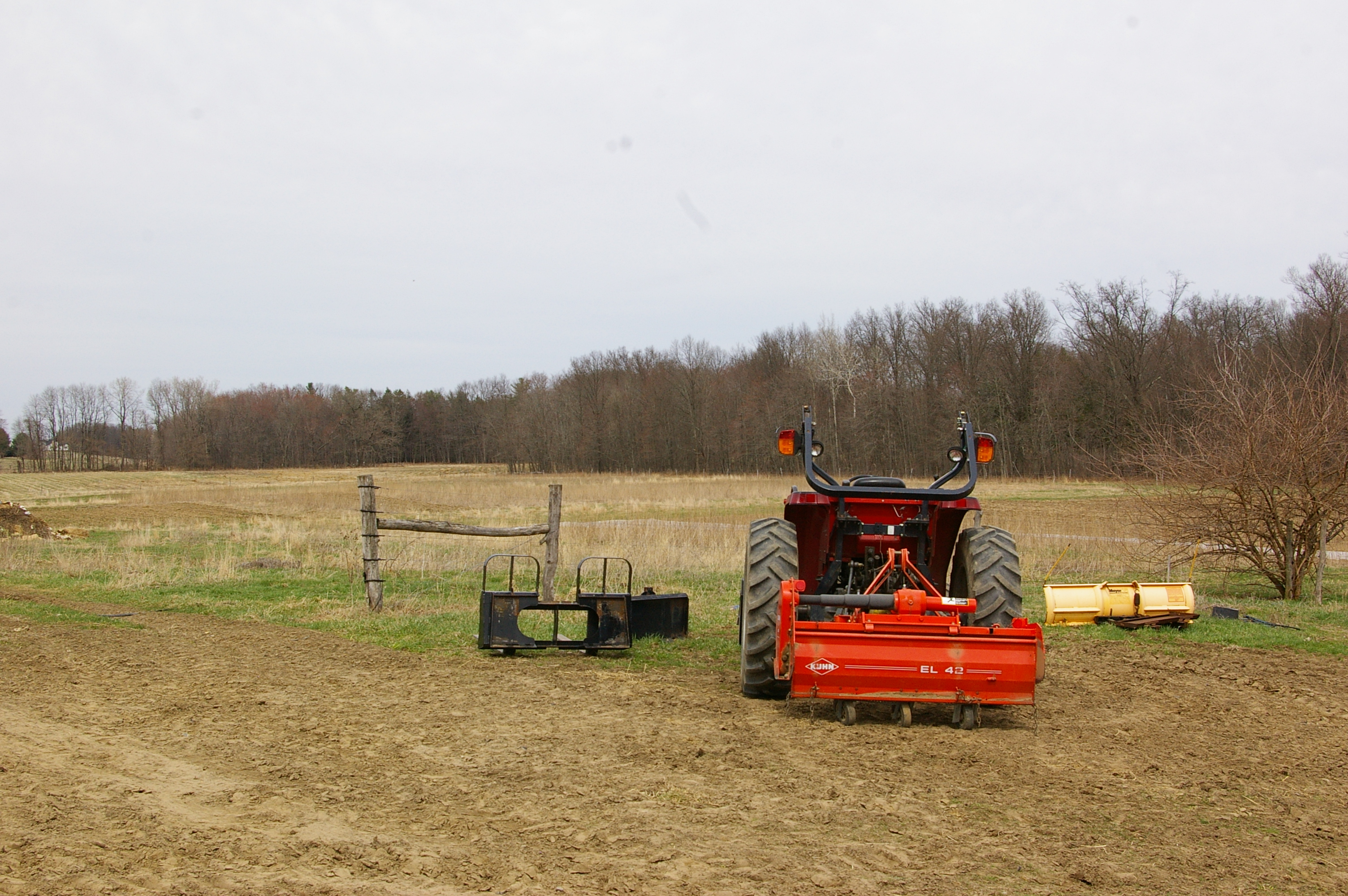
Protected land at Monkshood Nursery

The Columbia Land Conservancy offers protection for private farmland through conservation easements. Agricultural landowners may be able to access grant funds in exchange for their property's development rights through state programs. This can be especially appealing to small farmers and landowners who have held farmland for generations and do not want to see it commercialized. The Columbia Land Conservancy had protected 10,000 acres (40 km^{2}) of working farmland as of 2020.

The organization also founded a "Farmer Landowner Match Program" in 2008 for farmers to find conserved land to work. In 2013, this program partnered with the Dutchess Land Conservancy of adjacent Dutchess County to offer more options over a larger area.

== Funding ==
The Columbia Land Conservancy is a registered 501(c)(3) nonprofit supported by donors. It maintains Platinum Status on Guidestar.
