= Scenic Hudson =

Scenic Hudson is a non-profit environmental organization in New York that was founded in 1963 to oppose a hydro-electric power project in New York.

== History ==
Scenic Hudson was founded as the Scenic Hudson Preservation Conference on November 8, 1963, when Hudson Valley residents organized to save Storm King Mountain from being transformed into a pumped-storage hydroelectric plant. The organization successfully mounted the Scenic Hudson Preservation Conference v. Federal Power Commission court case, which saved the mountain and, for the first time, gave U.S. citizens legal standing to challenge development proposals on environmental grounds. Known as "The Scenic Hudson Decision," the case became a cornerstone of environmental law in the United States, and is widely credited with launching the modern environmental movement.

After the Storm King Mountain case, Scenic Hudson gained more visibility. It began working with other local communities to protect important natural resources and adopting sound environmental policies.

The Chair of the Board of Directors of the organization is Kristin Gamble, who succeeded James C. Goodfellow.

== Current projects ==
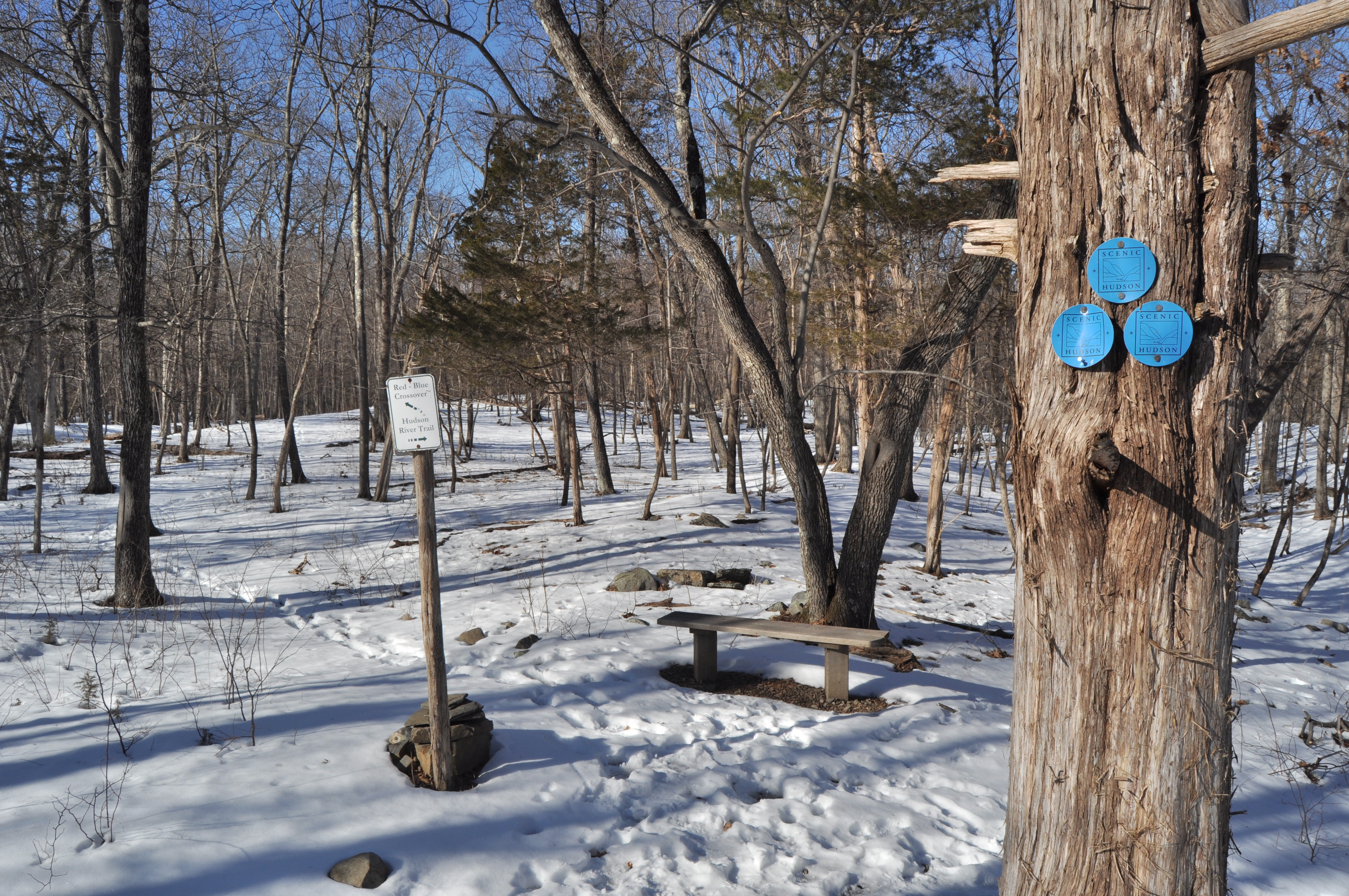
Hiking trails at Black Creek Preserve, one of Scenic Hudson's parks, in Esopus

The organization has three major focus area: Protecting land, creating and enhancing parks and preserves, and advocating for environmentally responsible policies and development outcomes.

=== Land ===
Working primarily along the Hudson River between New York City and Albany, the organization acquires land and conservation easements to create parks and preserves, protect lands of high scenic and ecological importance, and conserve farmland. Much of its land protection work is completed in partnership with private landowners, local land trusts, and local, state, and federal public agencies. Land and conservation easements are typically acquired and held by Scenic Hudson's affiliate organization, The Scenic Hudson Land Trust, Inc. The organizations have protected over 31,000 acres in nine counties. In 2011, the organization received the Land Trust Alliance's National Land Trust Excellence Award.

=== Parks ===
Scenic Hudson has created and enhanced more than 60 parks, preserves, and historic sites.

=== Advocacy ===
==== Land-Use ====
Scenic Hudson works with municipalities and other environmental organizations to connect the public with the Hudson River, improve water quality, encourage responsible development practices, and revitalize urban waterfronts. In 2010, the organization published Revitalizing Hudson Riverfronts, a handbook which provides guidance for balancing conservation and development goals on urban waterfronts. More recently, it launched a series of task forces to help riverfront communities adapt to climate change-induced sea level rise. The organization also works with the Hudson Valley Smart Growth Alliance.

Revitalizing Downtown Poughkeepsie

In 2020, Scenic Hudson along with other local partners acquired two old manufacturing buildings and properties in the city of Poughkeepsie. The acquisition is a part of a bigger project slowly underway by Scenic Hudson to revitalize the city’s Northside neighborhood. The spaces will likely be used for office spaces, “parkland,” and public gathering spaces. Another element of the project slightly farther along is the Pershing Avenue Neighborhood Farm, of which the construction started in fall 2020. The farm will consist of a quarter acre plot, with half being used for educational purposes, and all food grown will be distributed through Duchess Outreach, another local non-profit organization. The second half will act as a community garden where community members can rent out space. The hope is that the farm will give the community safer spaces to be outside, as well as a food supply.

The Pershing Avenue Neighborhood Farm is a part of a response to the status of the city of Poughkeepsie as a food desert. A 2014 study found that one in four households in Poughkeepsie was food insecure. This statistic was the same for access to a car, which has been proven to impact food security. Today there are only three accessible food stores within the city limits, two of which are on the outskirts and may be difficult to access without reliable transportation. In 2018, Duchess Outreach Fresh Market distributed 8,000 pounds of food grown in the Hudson Valley region, and the Pershing Avenue Farm will provide an additional stream of local food to that critical source. Additionally, in encouraging local residents to learn to grow their own food, the hope is that there will be a further increase in accessibility to healthy food.

While Scenic Hudson has been a critical actor in this project, a number of other organizations in the area have been instrumental. These include Cornell Cooperative Extension, Nubian Directions, Duchess Outreach, Poughkeepsie Farm Project, Poughkeepsie Alliance, and the City of Poughkeepsie. Additionally, press releases from Scenic Hudson indicate that they will continue to work with community members for insights on planning. All of these moving parts are instrumental in ensuring a grassroots, sustainable approach to revitalizing the dilapidated downtown area.

==== Public policy ====
Scenic Hudson has helped establish and advance numerous environmental initiatives, including the Hudson River Estuary Program, the New York State Coastal Management Program, the Hudson River Valley Greenway, the Clean Water Act, the Hudson Valley Community Preservation Act and the National Heritage Area Designation, and the Hudson River National Estuarine Research Reserve, a National Estuarine Research Reserve, and created and managed in partnership with the National Oceanic and Atmospheric Administration.

Scenic Hudson is currently working with other environmental organizations to facilitate the removal of polychlorinated biphenyl materials from the Hudson River.

== Conservation Partners ==
- Audubon New York
- Columbia Land Conservancy
- Dutchess Land Conservancy
- Esopus Creek Conservancy
- Greene Land Trust
- The Highlands Coalition
- Hudson Valley Smart Energy Coalition
- Hudson Highlands Land Trust
- Hudson River National Estuarine Research Reserve
- Land Trust Alliance
- Metropolitan Transportation Authority
- Mohawk Hudson Conservancy
- National Oceanic and Atmospheric Administration
- National Park Service
- Natural Resources Conservation Service
- New Baltimore Conservancy
- New York State Conservation Partnership Program
- New York State Department of Environmental Conservation
- New York State Office of Parks, Recreation and Historic Preservation
- The Nature Conservancy, Eastern New York Chapter
- New York-New Jersey Trail Conference
- The Olana Partnership
- Open Space Institute
- Orange County Land Trust
- Pallisades Interstate Park Commission
- Protect the Pallisades
- Riverkeeper
- Thomas Cole House
- Trust for Public Land
- Westchester Land Trust
- Winnakee Land Trust
- United States Department of Agriculture
- Wallkill Valley Land Trust
- Walkway Over the Hudson

== See also ==
- Glynwood Center
