= List of nature centers in New York =

This is a list of nature centers and environmental education centers in the state of New York.

To use the sortable tables: click on the icons at the top of each column to sort that column in alphabetical order; click again for reverse alphabetical order.

== List ==
Name	Location	County	Region	Summary
Adirondack Interpretive Center	Newcomb	Essex	Adirondack Region	Managed by the SUNY College of Environmental Science and Forestry, 236 acres
Albany Pine Bush Preserve Discovery Center	Albany	Albany	Capital District	Exhibits and activities about the 3,200-acre inland pine barrens preserve
Alley Pond Environmental Center	Douglaston	Queens	New York City	655 acre park with live animals, museum exhibits, library
Amboy 4-H Environmental Education Center	Williamstown	Oswego	Central New York	150 acres, operated by the Cornell Cooperative Extension of Oswego County
Ashokan Center	Olivebridge	Ulster	Mid-Hudson	374 acres, features cluster of 18th and 19th century craft shops, farm, focus on outdoor and environmental education, art, science and living history
Audubon Center at Knox Farm State Park	East Aurora	Erie	Western New York	633-acre park, center operated by the National Audubon Society in partnership with the Buffalo Audubon Society
Audubon Community Nature Center	Jamestown	Chautauqua	Western New York	600 acres
Baltimore Woods Nature Center	Marcellus	Onondaga	Central New York	180 acres
Beaver Island State Park Nature Center	Grand Island	Erie	Western New York	950 acres, center open Friday-Sunday
Beaver Lake Nature Center	Baldwinsville	Onondaga	Central New York	661 acres, operated by the County
Beaver Meadow Audubon Center	North Java	Wyoming	Western New York	324 acres, operated by Buffalo Audubon Society
Belleayre Mountain Interactive Nature Center	Highmount	Ulster	Mid-Hudson	Part of the Belleayre Mountain resort, operated by the New York State Department of Environmental Conservation in the summer
Belvedere Castle Visitor Center	Manhattan	Manhattan	New York City	Interpretive center for the 843-acre Central Park
Brookville Outdoor and Environmental Education Center	Brookville	Nassau	Long Island	operated by Nassau BOCES
Blue Heron Park Nature Center	Staten Island	Staten Island	New York City	236-acre city park with nature center
Caleb Smith State Park Preserve	Smithtown	Suffolk	Long Island	543 acres, features a nature museum
Caumsett Outdoor and Environmental Education Center	Lloyd Harbor	Suffolk	Long Island	operated by Nassau BOCES in Caumsett State Historic Park
Cayuga Nature Center	Ithaca	Tompkins	Central New York	Part of the Ithaca Discovery Trail, 120 acres, features a six-story tree house and a seasonal butterfly garden
Center for Science Teaching and Learning	Rockville Centre	Nassau	Long Island	17 acre Tanglewood Preserve with butterfly garden, mini-zoo and museum
Center for the Urban River at Beczak	Yonkers	Westchester	Lower Hudson	Hudson River interpretive center, tidal marsh and 2-acre park, operated by Sarah Lawrence College and the Hudson River Valley Environmental Education Institute at the former Beczak Environmental Education Center
Chip Holt Nature Center	Lakeville	Livingston	Western New York	located on Conesus Lake in Vitale Park, co-sponsored by the Town
Clark Reservation State Park	Jamesville	Onondaga	Central New York	377 acres, nature center is operated by the Council of Park Friends
Clay Pit Ponds State Park Preserve	Staten Island	Staten Island	New York City	260 acre nature preserve and interpretive center
Cold Spring Harbor Fish Hatchery and Aquarium	Cold Spring Harbor	Nassau	Long Island	Trout hatchery and education center about the freshwater ecosystems of New York
Connetquot River State Park Preserve	Oakdale	Suffolk	Long Island	3,473 acres, features the Long Island Environmental Interpretive Center
Constitution Marsh Audubon Center	Cold Spring	Putnam	Lower Hudson	270-acre tidal marsh
Cornell Lab of Ornithology	Ithaca	Tompkins	Central New York	226-acre Sapsucker Woods Sanctuary, part of the Ithaca Discovery Trail, natural history, observation and conservation of birds
Cranberry Lake Preserve	White Plains	Westchester	Lower Hudson	190 acres, operated by the County
Croton Point Nature Center	Croton-on-Hudson	Westchester	Lower Hudson	508 acres, operated by the County
Crotona Park Nature Center	Bronx	Bronx	New York City	127-acre park, center open for programs and by appointment
Cumming Nature Center	Naples	Ontario	Western New York	900 acre preserve, operated by the Rochester Museum and Science Center
Dana Discovery Center	Manhattan	Manhattan	New York City	operated by the City in the Harlem region of Central Park
Dyken Pond Environmental Education Center	Grafton	Rensselaer	Capital District	594 acre park with environmental education programs
Dyson College Nature Center	Pleasantville	Westchester	Lower Hudson	center for environmental education, operated by Pace University
Edith G. Read Wildlife Sanctuary	Rye	Westchester	Lower Hudson	179 acres, operated by the County
Emma Treadwell Thacher Nature Center	Voorheesville	Albany	Capital District	Operated by the State in Thompson's Lake State Park
Eric Humphrey Nature Center	Castile	Wyoming	Finger Lakes	14,427 acres (58.4 km), open daily, year-round nature programming, operated by the State in Letchworth State Park
Finch Hollow Nature Center	Johnson City	Broome	Southern Tier	operated by the County, natural history museum and education center, 1 mile trail
Five Rivers Environmental Education Center	Delmar	Albany	Capital District	450 acres, operated by the New York State Department of Environmental Conservation
Forest Park Visitor Center	Queens	Queens	New York City	538-acre city park, center open by appointment
Forsyth Nature Center	Kingston	Ulster	Mid-Hudson	supported by the Friends of Forsyth Nature Center and the City of Kingston Parks and Recreation Department
Fort Greene Park	Brooklyn	Brooklyn	New York City	30-acre park, visitor center exhibits and nature programs
Fort Niagara State Park Nature Center	Porter	Niagara	Western New York	Open in the summer
Fort Totten Park	Queens	Queens	New York City	60-acre park, visitor center with weekend environmental education programs
Garvies Point Museum and Preserve	Glen Cove	Nassau	Long Island	exhibits on Long Island and state geology, Native American archaeology, 62 acre preserve
Genesee Country Village and Museum	Mumford	Monroe	Western New York	19th-century living history museum covering more than 600 acres, includes an art gallery and nature center that is open only on weekends in January and February
Genesee County Park Interpretive Nature Center	East Bethany	Genesee	Western New York	430 acres, operated by the County
Greenbelt Nature Center	Staten Island	Staten Island	New York City	located in the 844-acre LaTourette Park
Greenburgh Nature Center	Scarsdale	Westchester	Lower Hudson	33-acre nature preserve with trails, a pond and gardens
Hansen Nature Center	Henrietta	Monroe	Western New York	located in the 68-acre Tinker Nature Park
Helmer Nature Center	Rochester	Monroe	Western New York	45 acres, operated by the West Irondequoit Central School District
High Rock Nature Center	Staten Island	Staten Island	New York City	operated by the City in 94-acre High Rock Park, open by appointment
Higley Flow State Park	Colton	St. Lawrence	Adirondack Region	Open in the summer
Hoyt Farm Nature Center	Commack	Suffolk	Long Island	operated by the Town as part of Hoyt Farm Nature Preserve
Hudson Highlands Nature Museum	Cornwall	Orange	Mid-Hudson	two locations, the Wildlife Education Center with exhibits and live animals and the Outdoor Discovery Center with trails
Indian Creek Nature Center	Canton	St. Lawrence	Adirondack Region	about 350 acres, trails and education in the Upper and Lower Lakes Wildlife Management Area, operated by North Country Conservation-Education Associates
Inwood Hill Park Nature Center	Manhattan	Manhattan	New York City	196 acres, open to the public on weekends from April through October
Iroquois National Wildlife Refuge	Basom	Genesee	Western New York	10,828 acres, exhibits and nature programs offered at the Visitor Contact Station in partnership with the Buffalo Audubon Society, the U.S. Fish & Wildlife Service and the Friends of Iroquois National Wildlife Refuge
Jones Beach Energy & Nature Center	Wantagh	Nassau	Long Island	Joint project between Long Island Power Authority and New York State Office of Parks, Recreation and Historic Preservation that replaced the Theodore Roosevelt Nature Center. Hosts a variety of programs, has live animals and exhibits.
Kaler's Pond Nature Center	Center Moriches	Suffolk	Long Island	open seasonally
Kathryn W. Davis Riverwalk Center	Sleepy Hollow	Westchester	Lower Hudson	Hudson River environment and art programs, adjacent to Kingsland Point Park, operated by the Hudson River Valley Environmental Education Institute
Lenoir Preserve	Yonkers	Westchester	Lower Hudson	40 acres, operated by the County
Lime Hollow Center for Environment and Culture	Cortland	Cortland	Central New York	400 acres
Lloyd and Carol Bull Nature Center	Herkimer	Herkimer	Central New York	part of Herkimer County Community College
Madden Outdoor Education Center	Carmel	Putnam	Lower Hudson	120 acres, operated by Putnam-Northern Westchester BOCES
Marine Nature Study Area	Hempstead	Nassau	Long Island	52 acre preserve devoted to environmental education and natural history
Marshlands Conservancy	Rye	Westchester	Lower Hudson	operated by the County, 147 acres
Mendon Ponds Park	Honeoye Falls	Monroe	Western New York	2,500 acres, operated by the County
Minna Anthony Common Nature Center	Wellesley Island	Jefferson	Thousand Islands	Locate in Wellesley Island State Park
Minnewaska State Park Preserve	Kerhonkson	Ulster	Mid-Hudson	21,106 acres, nature center is open on weekends seasonally
Mohonk Preserve	New Paltz	Ulster	Mid-Hudson	over 7,000 acres, exhibits and programs at the Visitor Center
Montezuma Audubon Center	Savannah	Wayne	Western New York	198 acres, operated by Audubon New York and the New York State Department of Environmental Conservation in the Northern Montezuma Wildlife Management Area
Mud Creek Environmental Learning Center	Ghent	Columbia	Capital District	operated by the Columbia County Soil & Water Conservation District
Orchard Beach Nature Center	Bronx	Bronx	New York City	Located in Pelham Bay Park, open seasonally
Paul Smith's College Visitor Interpretive Center	Paul Smiths	Franklin	Adirondack Region	Operated by Paul Smith's College, about 2,700 acres
Pember Museum	Granville	Washington	Adirondack Region	natural history museum and 125 preserve
Pfeiffer Nature Center	Portville	Cattaraugus	Western New York	648 acres in 2 properties
Point Au Roche State Park	Beekmantown	Clinton	Adirondack Region	
Prospect Park Audubon Center at the Boathouse	Brooklyn	Brooklyn	New York City	585-acre park, center is a partnership between the Prospect Park Alliance and Audubon New York
Quogue Wildlife Refuge	Quogue	Suffolk	Long Island	305 acres, managed by the Southampton Township Wildfowl Association, includes Charles Banks Belt Nature Center
Red House Nature Center at Inlet Pond County Park	Greenport	Suffolk	Long Island	operated by the North Fork Audubon Society in the 55-acre county park
Reinstein Woods Nature Preserve	Depew	Erie	Western New York	Operated by the New York State Department of Environmental Conservation, 292 acres
Robert Moses State Park	Massena	St. Lawrence	Adirondack Region	Nature center being rebuilt
Rockland Lake State Park	Congers	Rockland	Lower Hudson	Nature center open in the summer
Roger Tory Peterson Institute of Natural History	Jamestown	Chautauqua	Western New York	includes the Roger Tory Peterson Art Gallery and his personal library
Rogers Environmental Education Center	Sherburne	Chenango	Central New York Region	600 acres owned by the state, center operated by the Friends of Rogers
Rye Nature Center	Rye	Westchester	Lower Hudson	47 acres, city-owned facility supported by the Friends of Rye Nature Center
Salt Marsh Nature Center	Brooklyn	Brooklyn	New York City	Located in 798-acre Marine Park, operated by the Salt Marsh Alliance
Sam's Point Preserve	Cragsmoor	Ulster	Mid-Hudson	4,600 acres, features the Sam’s Point Conservation Center, managed by the Nature Conservancy
Shaver Pond Nature Center	Grafton	Rensselaer	Capital District	Operated by the state in 2,357-acre Grafton Lakes State Park, open occasionally
Sheldrake Environmental Center	Larchmont	Westchester	Lower Hudson	60 acres, located on Sheldrake Lake
South Fork Natural History Museum and Nature Center	Bridgehampton	Suffolk	Long Island	70 acres, natural history museum, live animals
South Shore Nature Center	East Islip	Suffolk	Long Island	200 acres, operated by the Seatuck Environmental Center, Orr Wildlife Learning Center open on weekends
Spencer Crest Nature Center	Corning	Steuben	Southern Tier	250 acres, operated by Corning Community College
Sterling Nature Center	Sterling	Cayuga	Central New York	1,428 acres on 2 county-owned sites, operated by the Friends of Sterling Nature Center
Stony Kill Farm	Fishkill	Dutchess	Mid-Hudson	1000+ acre working farm and environmental education center, operated by the Stony Kill Foundation
Suffolk County Environmental Center	Islip	Suffolk	Long Island	70 acres, operated by the Seatuck Environmental Center at the Scully Estate
Sweetbriar Nature Center	Smithtown	Suffolk	Long Island	54 acres
Taconic Outdoor Education Center	Cold Spring	Putnam	Lower Hudson	Operated by the New York State Office of Parks, Recreation and Historic Preservation in 14,086-acre Clarence Fahnestock State Park
Tanglewood Nature Center & Museum	Elmira	Chemung	Southern Tier	
Teatown Lake Reservation	Ossining	Westchester	Lower Hudson	834-acre preserve located in the towns of Yorktown, Cortland and New Castle
Theodore Roosevelt Sanctuary & Audubon Center	Oyster Bay	Nassau	Long Island	website, 12 acres, operated by Audubon New York
Tifft Nature Preserve	Buffalo	Erie	Western New York	website, 264 acres, operated by the Buffalo Museum of Science
Trailside Nature Museum	Cross River	Westchester	Lower Hudson	operated by the County, collection of mounted animals, American Indian artifacts, educational exhibits, interactive displays, and nature-oriented artwork, situated on the 4,400-acre Ward Pound Ridge Reservation
Twin Cedars Environmental Area	East Avon	Livingston	Western New York	59 acres, operated by the State, outdoor facilities only
Up Yonda Farm	Bolton Landing	Warren	Adirondack Region	73 acres, operated by Warren County Parks and Recreation
Van Cortlandt Park Nature Center	Bronx	Bronx	New York City	1,146-acre park, center open seasonally
WaterFront Center	Oyster Bay	Nassau	Long Island	Sailing and marine environmental education center
Waterman Conservation Education Center	Apalachin	Tioga	Southern Tier	96 acre main site, manages four sites in the Tioga County area and one site in the Broome County area
Weinberg Nature Center	Scarsdale	Westchester	Lower Hudson	10 acres, part of Scarsdale Parks, Recreation and Conservation Department
Wertheim National Wildlife Refuge	Brookhaven	Suffolk	Long Island	2,550 acres, visitor center exhibits and programs
Westmoreland Sanctuary	Bedford Corners	Westchester	Lower Hudson	640 acre wildlife preserve and museum
Wild Center	Tupper Lake	Franklin	Adirondack Region	Formerly the Natural History Museum of the Adirondacks, 81 acres, natural history museum and education center
Woodlawn Beach State Park Nature Center	Blasdell	Erie	Western New York	

== Defunct nature centers ==
- Marty McGuire Environmental Museum at Dyson College Nature Center, Pleasantville, converted into the Marty McGuire Environmental Lab

== See also ==
- List of museums in New York
- List of nature centers in the United States
- List of New York state parks
