= Constitution Marsh =

Marsh in Garrison, New York, US

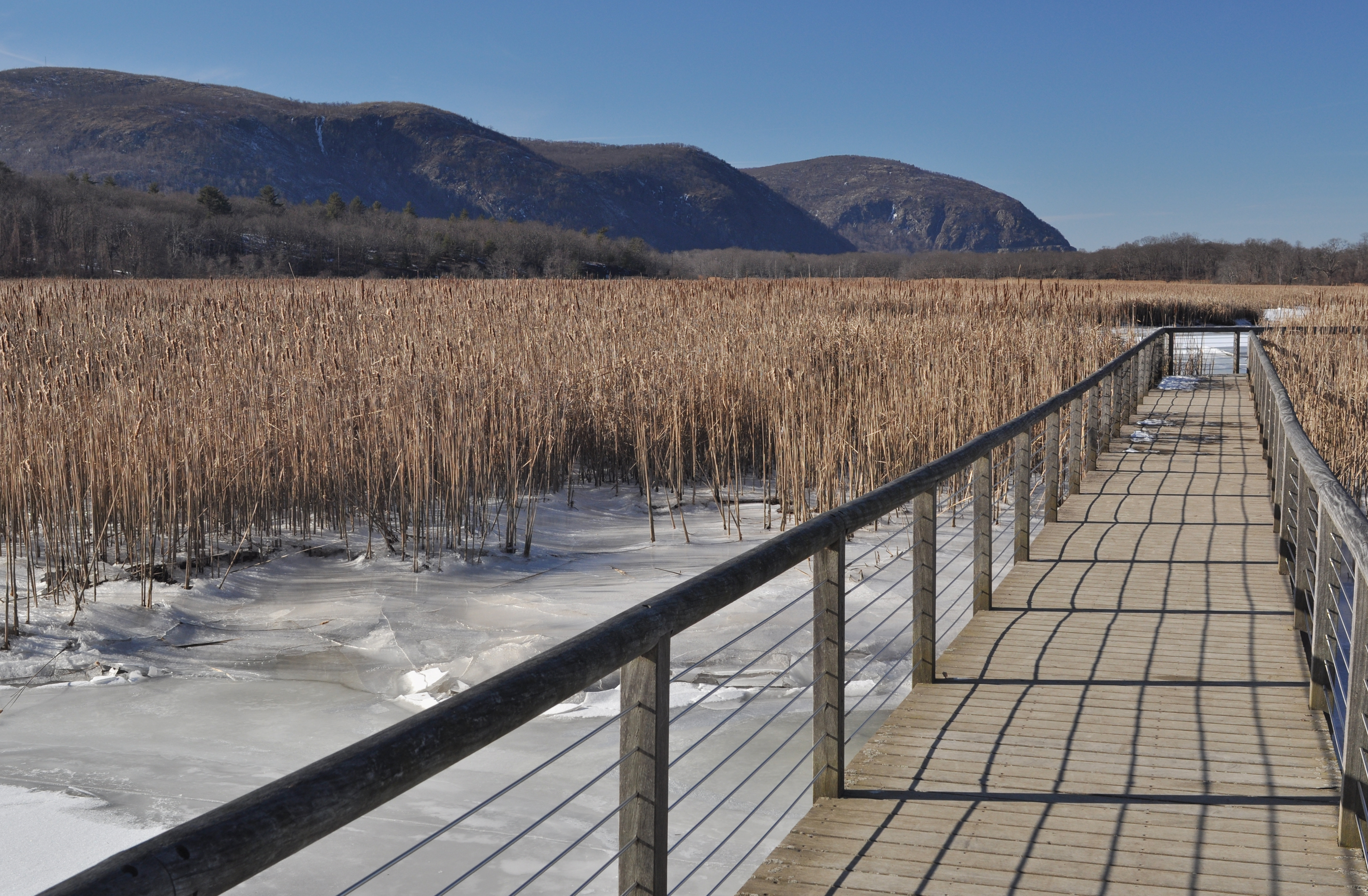
Boardwalk through the marsh in winter

Constitution Marsh is a 270-acre (110 ha) fresh water and brackish tidal marsh located between Constitution Island and the eastern shores of the Hudson River in Garrison, New York. Together with 80 acres (32 ha) of bordering woodlands, it forms the National Audubon Society's Constitution Marsh Audubon Center and Wildlife Sanctuary. Part of Hudson Highlands State Park, it is one of five major tidal marshes along the Hudson River. Constitution Marsh is an Audubon Important Bird Area, and has been listed as a New York State Bird Conservation Area since the early 2000s. It is also recognized by the New York State Department of State as both a Significant Coastal Fish and Wildlife Habitat and a Scenic Area of Statewide Significance.

== Ecology ==
A small creek called Indian Brook flows to the Hudson River through the southern end of the sanctuary; the estuarine environment near the mouth of the creek attracts a wide array of fish, crustaceans, and amphibians, among other animals, some of which are otherwise uncommon in the region.

Over 200 species of both migratory and non-migratory birds have been identified in the marsh. It serves as a wintering ground and stop-over point for migrating waterfowl, which gather in numbers as high as 4,000 in the fall. These waterfowl include American black ducks, wood ducks, and mallards. Constitution Marsh is also used by migrating pied-billed grebes, ospreys, northern harriers, and peregrine falcons; at least 2 and as many as 30 bald eagles can be found there in the winter. Autumn concentrations of swallows once peaked at 100,000, but have dwindled since the mid-1990s. Over 50 different bird species are known to breed within the wildlife sanctuary, including the least bittern, worm-eating warbler, Virginia rail, Louisiana waterthrush, northern cardinal, spotted sandpiper, gray catbird, common yellowthroat, marsh wren, eastern phoebe, swamp sparrow, and willow flycatcher, as well as the wood thrush, which breeds in the forest near the swamp. The marsh was included in bird habitat studies in 1986–1987 and again in 2005. The results revealed that the diversity of breeding bird species is steadily decreasing as the red-winged blackbird becomes dominant.

In addition to its value as a bird habitat, it is also an important nursery and spawning area for fish, including striped bass, shad, herring, and mummichog. Some 1,000 snapping turtles live in the marsh, and frequently lay their eggs at the nearby Boscobel estate grounds. The area contains invasive species like common reed, purple loosestrife, water caltrop, zebra mussels, and mute swans.

== History ==
The marsh itself is estimated to be 4,000–5,000 years old. It is crisscrossed by a series of channels dug in the 1830s as part of wild rice farming efforts. The site was purchased by New York State in 1969, and has been managed by the National Audubon Society since 1970.

Constitution Marsh sits adjacent to Foundry Cove, which was heavily polluted by industrial waste from a nickel–cadmium battery manufacturing plant that operated between 1952 and 1979. In total, 115,904 lb (52,573 kg) of cadmium was released into Foundry Cove, making it "the most cadmium polluted site in the world." Some of the metal spread to Constitution Marsh in high concentration pockets. Sediment dredging efforts in the early 1970s were largely unsuccessful, and extremely high levels of both nickel and cadmium were later observed in the cove and marsh; as a result, the Environmental Protection Agency listed the area as a Superfund site in 1983. Federal remediation of the site was completed in 1995 after extensive dredging conducted in Foundry Cove. Long-term sediment and water monitoring was prescribed for Constitution Marsh, as it was determined that similar dredging there would have caused disproportionate environmental damage. Additionally, the contaminants would soon be buried beneath clean sediment after the remediation of Foundry Cove. Cadmium levels rapidly decreased throughout the area, and after eight years, levels of particulate and soluble metal pollutants were lower than in the Hudson River at New York City.

== Recreation ==
Recreational opportunities include hiking trails that lead to a 700 ft (210 m) boardwalk exploring the marsh, and limited paddling access through the network of man-made channels. The current boardwalk replaced a much shorter version in 2001, and was dedicated to James P. Rod, an environmentalist who served as the warden for the sanctuary from 1982 until his death in 1998. The trails and boardwalk offer expansive views of the Hudson Highlands, including Storm King Mountain and Breakneck Ridge, as well as the United States Military Academy across the river.

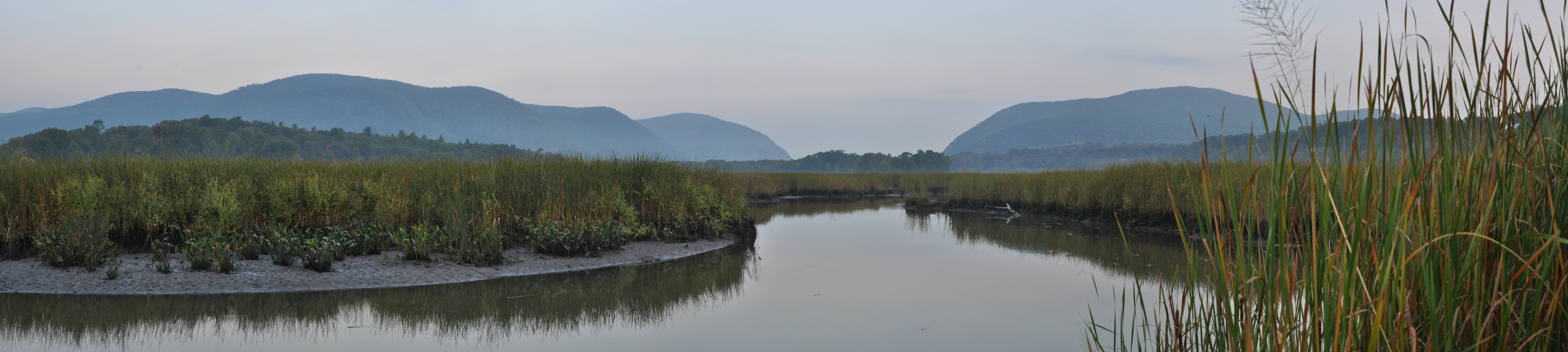
Panorama of the marsh looking northwest in October 2012

== See also ==
- List of Superfund sites in New York
- List of nature centers in New York
