= Valhalla Highlands Historic District =

Historic district in New York, United States

- U.S. National Register of Historic Places
- Location within New York Location within the United States
- Location: Roughly Highland Rd., Locust, Lookout & Mountainview Drs., near Cold Spring, New York
- Coordinates: 41°28′44″N 73°55′40″W
- Area: 873.28 acres (353.40 ha)
- Built: c. 1928-1951
- Architect: Hakon (Hakorn) Jacobsen; Erik Kaeyer
- Architectural style: Late 19th and early 20th century movements
- NRHP reference No.: 14000915
- Added to NRHP: November 12, 2014

Valhalla Highlands Historic District, also known as Lake Valhalla, is a national historic district located near Cold Spring in Putnam County, New York. The district encompasses 57 contributing buildings, 11 contributing sites, 10 contributing structures, 7 contributing objects and a 900-acre forest in an early second home community established by primarily German/Austrians and Norwegians from New York City. It developed between the early-1930s and mid-1940s, and includes lodges that are typically one or two stories high and have fieldstone foundations. They are characterized by structural stone walls and full log construction and frame dwellings clad with half-log wood siding and fieldstone veneer, chimneys and terraces. The district also includes a boat lodge with a ping-pong room and terrace, a swimming dock, a boat dock, a tea pavilion, a recreation pavilion, a lookout pavilion, shuffleboard courts, a tennis court, a playing field, a picnic area, rustic improvements throughout the forest and the remnants of a hunting cabin.

The on-site National Register plaque states:

"Valhalla Highlands was initiated in the early 1930s as a stylistically cohesive summer community with individual lodges, shared amenities, including Lake Valhalla, community buildings and a 1,100 acre forest with trails and rustic facilities and Valkyrie, the home of Ludwig Novoting, the creator of Valhalla Highlands.

All the lodges were placed on a planned layout with an organized system of boulder-lined unpaved roads, vistas and landscape features. No two lodges were the same and the community was placed within its natural setting. The District was an early occurrence of seasonal retreats for New Yorkers in the rural areas of the Hudson Valley during the early twentieth century.

The lodges, roads, common facilities and landscaping were a rustic interpretation of the Storybook Style popular in America between World War I and World War II. With whimsy and creative playfulness, the Valhalla Highlands interpretation was picturesque and nostalgic. These qualities were evident in the buttressed field stone and half-log walls, swooping multi-color asphalt shingle roofs with peaks, asymmetrical roof pitches, prominent field stone chimneys, cantilevered entry canopies, free-standing peeled log arches at the entrances, window awnings, half-log flower boxes, small-paned steel and wood windows, field stone paths and steps, boulder borders, rock gardens with elf figurines and knotty pine interiors. The ensemble blurred the line of fantasy and true reality with an inherent sense of humor. The playful, fairy-tale aesthetic of Valhalla Highlands matched the community’s theme of a Nordic paradise.

Eighty years later, on November 12, 2014, when the United States Department of the Interior listed the Valhalla Highlands Historic District on the National Register of Historic Places, the district was essentially unchanged from its time of origin."

It was listed on the National Register of Historic Places in 2014.
