= States Dyckman =

Historic house in New York State, USA

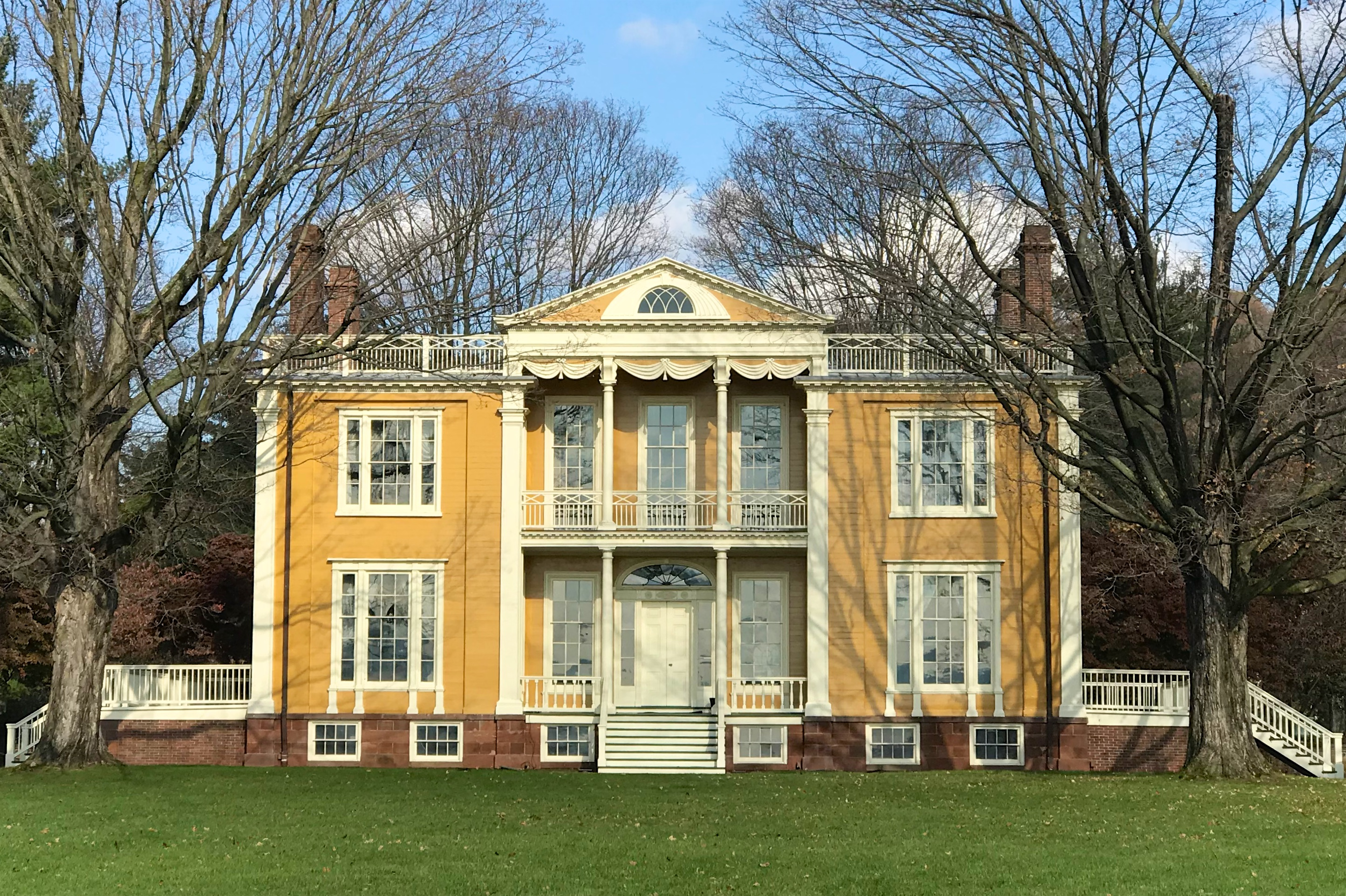
Dyckmans' home, Boscobel, on the Hudson River in New York state

States Dyckman was an American Loyalist during the American Revolution who lived in New York state. A descendant of early Dutch settlers of New Amsterdam, he proved to be a man of both questionable ethics and allegiances. He somehow was able to retain his family fortune despite being an active Loyalist and working in the British Army's Quartermaster Corps for most of the war, keeping the accounts of various quartermasters. Later, as an investigator of war profiteering among quartermasters he received a lifetime pension and other gifts from those whom he cleared, apparently by manipulating evidence.

== Biography ==
When Sir William Erskine, Quartermaster General, returned to England in 1779 to face an audit and investigation for war profiteering, he asked Dyckman to accompany him. Bribed off by Erskine with a life annuity, he remained in England ten years, profiting upon other investigations of quartermasters and only returned to the newly independent United States in 1789. While in London he associated with many wealthy members of society and acquired their tastes, particularly for the neoclassical buildings of Robert Adam. He bought many furnishings and decorative objects, such as a Wedgwood dinner service, and had them shipped back to the United States with him.

With the interest on a sizable life annuity granted him by Sir William Erskine for clearing the Baronet, Dyckman intended to build an estate on 250 acres (1 km²) near Montrose and named it Boscobel, perhaps after Boscobel House in Shropshire (itself named for the Italianate bosco bello, "pretty woodland"), symbolizing his Anglophilia. According to one biographer, he saw himself as a "conspicuously well-fixed farmer, surrounded with objects of taste...who did not farm too seriously". He began this process by marrying Elizabeth Corne, daughter of another Loyalist family, in 1794. But within a year he faced financial difficulties; the halt of Erskine's annuity by his heirs after his death and his own lavish tastes and generous gifts to less fortunate family members contributing to reduce his circumstances.

Dyckman returned to London in 1799, expecting to mend his fortunes and return to his wife, son and daughter within a year. Instead he remained three years, finishing the remaining quartermasters' investigation under John Dalrymple, himself once one of the inquiry's targets. He restored his fortunes by persuading the Erskines to restore their annuity and negotiating an extremely generous settlement with Dalrymple and the other quartermasters whom he had helped clear, apparently by manipulating evidence.

Wealthier but injured and ailing, Dyckman returned to the United States in 1803 and set about building the house he had long planned, Boscobel. It is possible that he had blueprints drawn up in England, since work began within six months of his return. The architect is not known, although surviving records show that a William Vermilye was heavily involved as construction manager. Dyckman died in 1806, before it was finished. His widow completed it, and she and their surviving son moved into it in 1808. In the mid-20th century it faced demolition, but was saved as a historic site. Relocated from Cortlandt to Garrison, New York, it is a popular tourist destination on the Hudson River.
