= Cold Spring Historic District =

- U.S. National Register of Historic Places
- U.S. Historic district
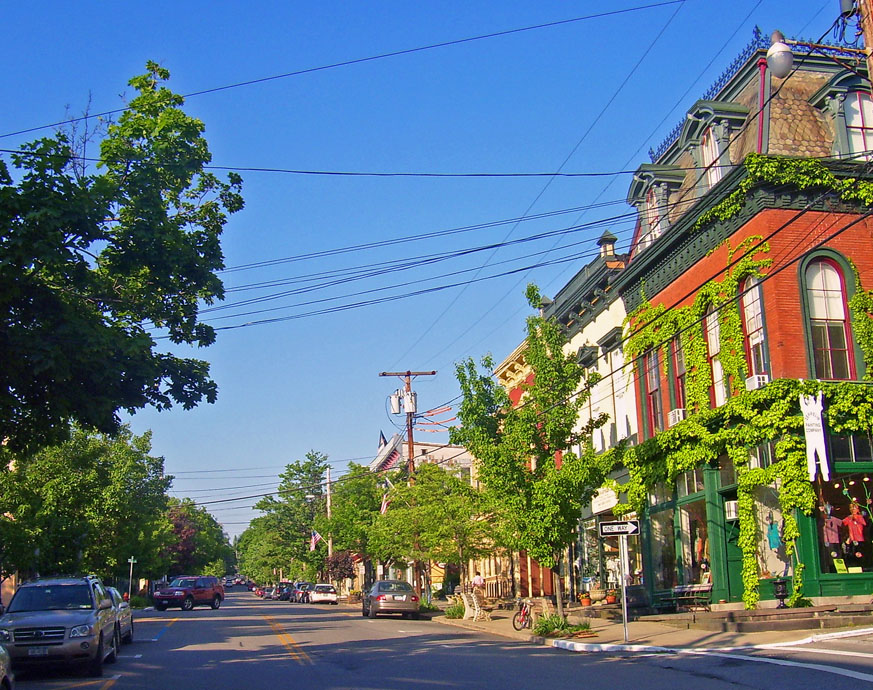
- Main Street in the Village of Cold Spring

- Location within New York Location within the United States
- Location: Cold Spring, NY
- Nearest city: Newburgh
- Coordinates: 41°25′12″N 73°57′18″W
- Area: 691 acres (280 ha)
- Built: Early 19th century
- Architectural style: Mixed styles
- MPS: Hudson Highlands MRA
- NRHP reference No.: 82001235
- Added to NRHP: November 23, 1982

The Cold Spring Historic District is a historic district that includes much of the central area of the Hudson River Cold Spring village in Putnam County, New York. It is roughly bounded by Main Street (in the northeastern portion of the village the eastern end of NY 301), Cedar (NY 9D) and Fair streets and Paulding Avenue.

It gives Cold Spring its quaint character and has been described as "one of the best-preserved 19th century townscapes in the Hudson River region". A consultants' report for the village's 1987 master plan quotes the National Register of Historic Places saying, upon adding the district in 1982:

As a surviving industrial village, Cold Spring's commercial, ecclesiastical and residential features reflect the economic and social dynamics of the (early 19th century) era. The distinctive store structures on the broad Main Street, the noticeable contrast of house types and neighborhoods and the variety of religious institutions dominated by the foundry owner's donated Episcopal church, are the legacy of the prosperous and paternalistic society in nineteenth century Cold Spring. They are significant today for their architectural and historical associations to important events in the history of the Hudson Highlands

Most of the houses, churches and other buildings came into existence in the years before the Civil War, when the nearby West Point Foundry was at the peak of its production and workers were rapidly moving into the area.

Today the district includes over 200 buildings, many of them contributing properties. They have helped transform the village into a popular upscale residence for commuters and weekend destination for New York City residents due to the nearby Metro-North train station offering easy access to Grand Central Terminal.

== 2005 lawsuit ==
Like some other municipalities with federally designated historic districts, Cold Spring has added sections to its zoning code to preserve that character. In 2005, resident Donald Lusk, filed suit in federal court against the village after it cited him for nonconforming signs he had put up in front of his house in protest of a proposed nearby condominium development. The case went all the way to appeals court, which decided in 2007 that his First Amendment rights had been violated by the process by which his signs were judged nonconforming, which partly considered the content of those signs. However, the ordinances dictating the size, shape and placement of the signs themselves were upheld as permissible regulations of the time, place and manner of speech.
