= The Highlands Current =

New York newspaper

Highlands Current
- Type: Weekly newspaper
- Founder(s): Gordon Stewart
- Founded: 2010
- Headquarters: 142 Main Street; Cold Spring, New York 10516
- Country: United States
- Website: highlandscurrent.org

The Highlands Current is a New York State weekly newspaper located in Cold Spring, New York. Currently owned and managed by a nonprofit corporation, Highlands Current Inc., the current publication was founded in 2010, and it "serves to provide readers a balanced reporting of news and events."

Edited by Chip Rowe, The Highlands Current provides two ways to access their news, through their official website and their print edition. Since its 2010 founding, it has won over 300 awards and has published over 23,000 articles. the office is located at 142 Main Street in Cold Spring.

== History ==
Highlands Current Inc. was founded in 2010 by Philipstown resident Gordon Stewart, under the name of Philipstown.Info, Inc. Originally providing readers news through their website, Stewart later expanded the corporation in 2012 to a print edition, called The Paper. In 2014, Stewart gathered a board of directors to officially establish a community-supported not-for-profit organization. Later that year, Stewart gave his position as publisher to the new board of the organization and died later that year.

In October 2015, the Internal Revenue Service confirmed the status of Philipstown.Info, Inc., as a tax-exempt nonprofit organization as described under section 501(c)(3) of the Internal Revenue Code. The organization was therefore eligible to receive contributions that were tax-deductible to the donor. The corporation was registered with the Charities Bureau in the Office of the New York State Attorney General and actively solicits contributions only within New York State. Furthermore, in May 2015, Philipstown.Info, Inc., became a member of the Institute for Nonprofit News. Its mission is “to provide education and business support services to our nonprofit member organizations and promote the value and benefit of public-service and investigative journalism”.

In April 2016, to reflect broadening coverage of Beacon and other neighboring towns, the newspaper was renamed The Highlands Current and the website, highlandscurrent.org. The corporation became Highlands Current Inc.

== Coverage ==
Every Friday, The Highlands Current publishes news to the Hudson River towns of Cold Spring, Garrison, and Beacon about Cold Spring, Beacon, Garrison, the Hudson Valley, Putnam County and Philipstown. It focuses on news covering business, community issues, crime, education, government, and social issues. The sections are further divided into sub-sections and provides readers with a range of variety from local to national news. In addition, the paper includes an online archive section that has hundreds of articles dating back to 2010.

== Awards ==
The Current has received recognition from state and national journalism organizations, including the National Newspaper Association and the New York Press Association. It was named NYPA Newspaper of the year in 2022, 2023 and 2024.

== See also ==
- List of newspapers in the United States
- List of New York City newspapers and magazines
