= Garrison train crash =

1897 railroad accident in New York State

Coordinates: 41.3673°N 73.9550°W

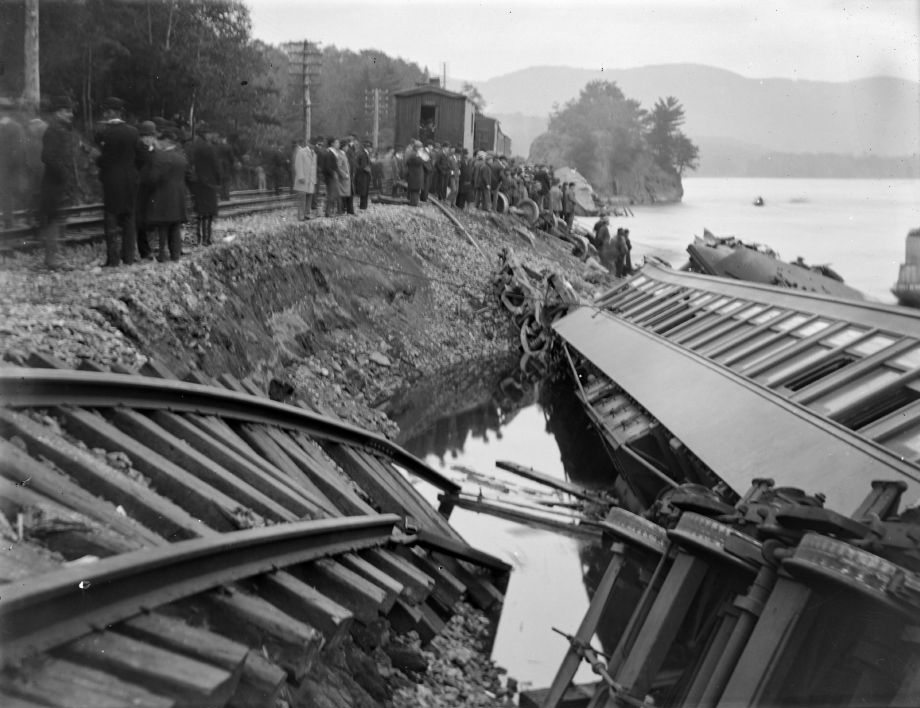

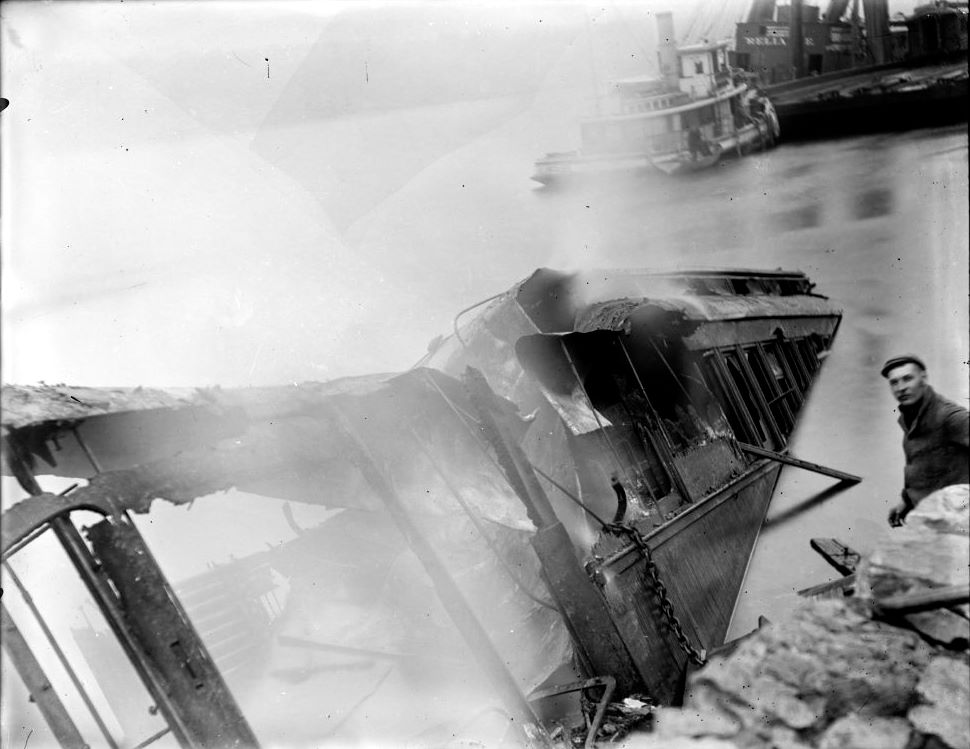

The Garrison train crash occurred on October 24, 1897, in Garrison, New York, at approximately 5:47 am, when train No. 46 of the New York Central & Hudson River Railroad derailed near King's Dock of the Hudson River division, about one and three-quarters miles south of Garrison. All but one of the 19 fatalities drowned when the embankment gave way, plunging the train into the Hudson River. Witnesses described feeling between one and three "thuds" before three of the five sleeper cars fell into the river. Several witnesses described seeing a "hole" in the trackbed after the accident, however, the cause of this was not determined. Early speculation blamed a large explosion of dynamite as the cause of the train's derailment. Two weeks previously, the same train had almost derailed near the same spot when a two-ton boulder was found on the tracks, with some believing it had been deliberately placed.

The final report on the cause of the accident was inconclusive, with investigators concluding that either the train derailed and then destroyed the embankment, or that the embankment gave way leading to the derailment. The commission noted that track walkers, employed to walk along the tracks to inspect them, and the embankment, for damage, were not employed during the summer except in periods of heavy storms. It recommended that the number of track walkers be immediately increased.
