= Garrison, New York =

Garrison
- hamlet
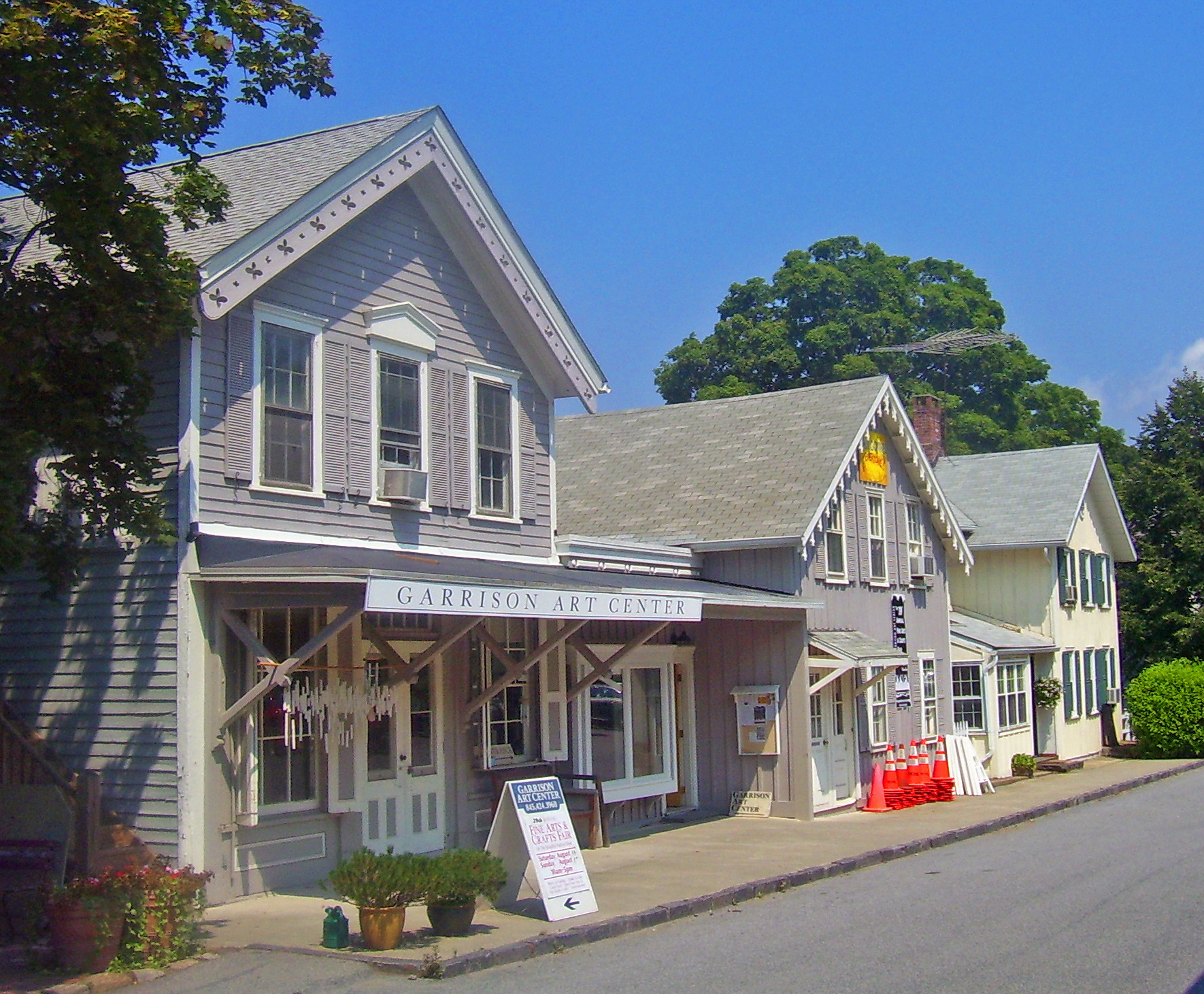
- The Garrison Art Center and other structures within the Garrison Landing Historic District.
- Interactive map of Garrison
- Coordinates: 41°23′02″N 73°56′44″W
- Country: United States
- State: New York (state)
- County: Putnam
- Town: Philipstown

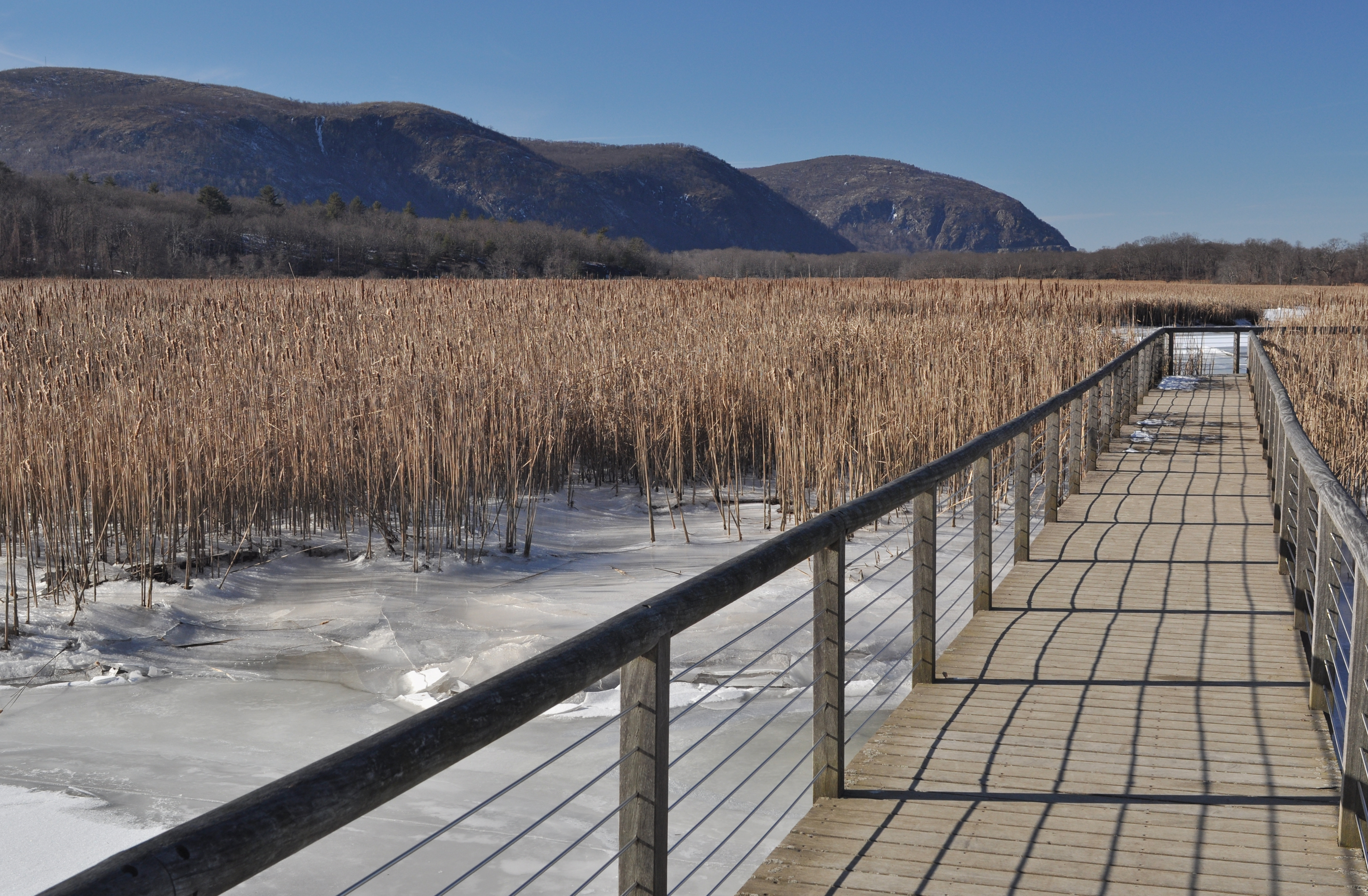
Constitution Marsh in winter

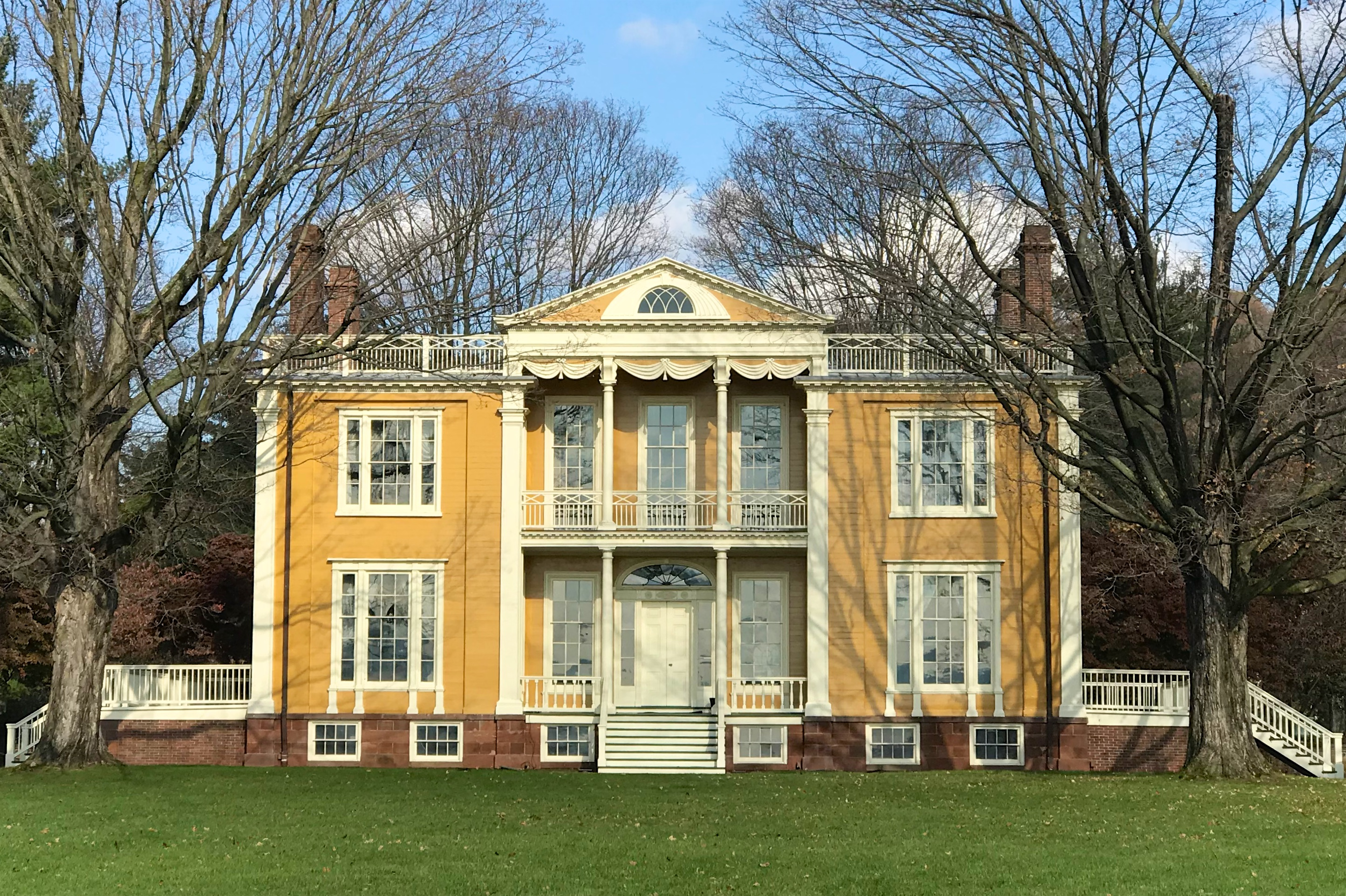
Boscobel, a historic house museum in Garrison

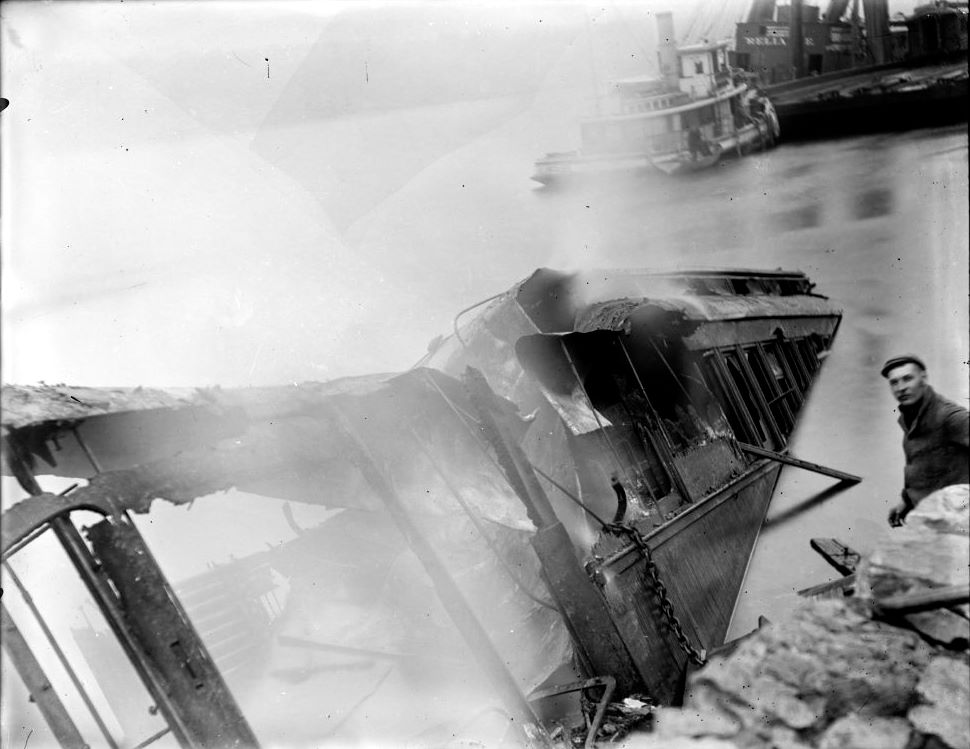
The Garrison train crash, 1897

Garrison is a hamlet in Putnam County, New York, United States. It is part of the town of Philipstown, on the east side of the Hudson River, across from the United States Military Academy at West Point. The Garrison Metro-North Railroad station serves the town. Garrison, which is also known as Garrison's Landing, was named after 2nd Lieutenant Isaac Garrison, who held a property lot on the Hudson River across from West Point and conducted a ferry service across the Hudson River between the two hamlets. Isaac and his son Beverly Garrison fought in the Battle of Fort Montgomery in 1777, were captured by the British and later set free.

The Garrison train crash took place near Garrison on the New York Central & Hudson River Railroad on October 24, 1897, killing 20 people.

== Places of interest ==
- Manitoga is the extensive woodland gardens estate of modernist designer Russel Wright, and the location of his modern-style house Dragon Rock, which is listed on the National Register of Historic Places. It is located 2.5 miles (4.0 km) south of Garrison station and is operated by the non-profit Russel Wright Design Center, with tours and hiking trails.
- Boscobel, located 3.3 miles (5.3 km) north of Garrison station, is a Federal-style mansion built 1804–1808 for States Dyckman and Elizabeth Dyckman, was originally located in Montrose, New York but was moved to Garrison and restored in the mid-20th century. The Hudson Valley Shakespeare Festival, founded in 1987 with its first performances at Manitoga, is now located at Boscobel.
- Constitution Marsh is an Audubon sanctuary 3.5 miles (5.6 km) north of Garrison station with walking trails and canoe tours on the Hudson River. The Hudson Highlands Land Trust promotes and assists in local conservation efforts.
- The Philipstown Depot Theater is at the former train station at Garrison's Landing, next to today's Metro-North Garrison station, and was the Yonkers Train Station in Hello, Dolly!.
- Graymoor, a Catholic monastery, which serves as the headquarters of the Society of the Atonement, is located in Garrison.
- The Garrison Institute is a progressive interfaith organization and retreat center.
- Hastings Center for Bioethics, founded in 1969, is an internationally recognized bioethics think tank and research center.
- The Garrison Art Center promotes local and regional artists.
- The national corporate headquarters of Outward Bound USA, the worldwide premier outdoor adventure and educational organization is also located in Garrison.
- Hudson Valley Shakespeare, performing at its open-air theater in the summer, is located near Garrison, with shuttle service to the Garrison train station.

== Media ==
Garrison is served by two weekly newspapers: The Highlands Current, founded in 2010 and published on Friday, and the Putnam County News & Recorder, founded in 1868 and published on Wednesday.

== Schools ==
Garrisons students are served by the Garrison Union Free School, a K–8 school. Graduating students have the choice of attending Haldane High School in Cold Spring or James I. O'Neill High School across the river in Highland Falls. Haldane High School was recognized as a Blue Ribbon School in 2016.

The Manitou Learning Center is a private Garrison school that emphasizes bilingual education, experiential learning and purposeful play.

== Notable people ==
- Roger Ailes, Fox News CEO
- Thomas Harlan Ellett, architect
- Hamilton Fish, United States Secretary of State
- Sergeant Hamilton Fish II, a member of Theodore Roosevelt's "Park Avenue Contingent", and the first of the Rough Riders to die, was killed near Sevilla, Cuba on June 23, 1898, and is buried in the St. Phillips Church Cemetery in Garrison.
- Hamilton Fish III, United States Congressman
- Isaac Garrison, 2nd Lieut. Revolutionary War, Captured by the British with 14 year old son, Beverly Garrison, Battle of Ft. Montgomery 1777. Founder of Garrison's Landing.
- James Gleick, writer
- Jim Hall, jazz musician, composer, and arranger lived in Garrison
- Patty Hearst, newspaper heiress and convicted bank robber, lives in Garrison
- Chris Hughes, co-founder of Facebook
- Don McLean, singer-songwriter and guitarist
- Juan Montoya, architect and interior designer, lives in Garrison
- Henry Fairfield Osborn (1857–1935), paleontologist, geologist and eugenicist, died in Garrison
- George Pataki, New York State Governor, lives in Garrison
- John Pielmeier, playwright, screenwriter and novelis, lives in Garrison with his wife, writer Irene O'Garden.
- Edwards Pierrepont, prominent attorney, jurist, and orator. Built 1867 Hurst-Pierrepont Estate in Garrison.
- Andrew Revkin, New York Times environmental writer, lives in Garrison
- Duncan Sheik, songwriter, movie score contributor and Broadway composer, lives in Garrison.
- Julie Taymor, theater, film and opera director, lives in Garrison.
- Rhinelander Waldo, New York City fire commissioner and police commissioner
- Matt Williams, television producer, lives in Garrison.

== In popular culture ==
For the 1969 film Hello, Dolly! starring Barbra Streisand, Garrison was the filming location for the Yonkers scenes. The Saint Basil Academy in the town served as the finish line of The Amazing Race 10 in 2006.
