= Hudson Valley Shakespeare Festival =

American non-profit theater company

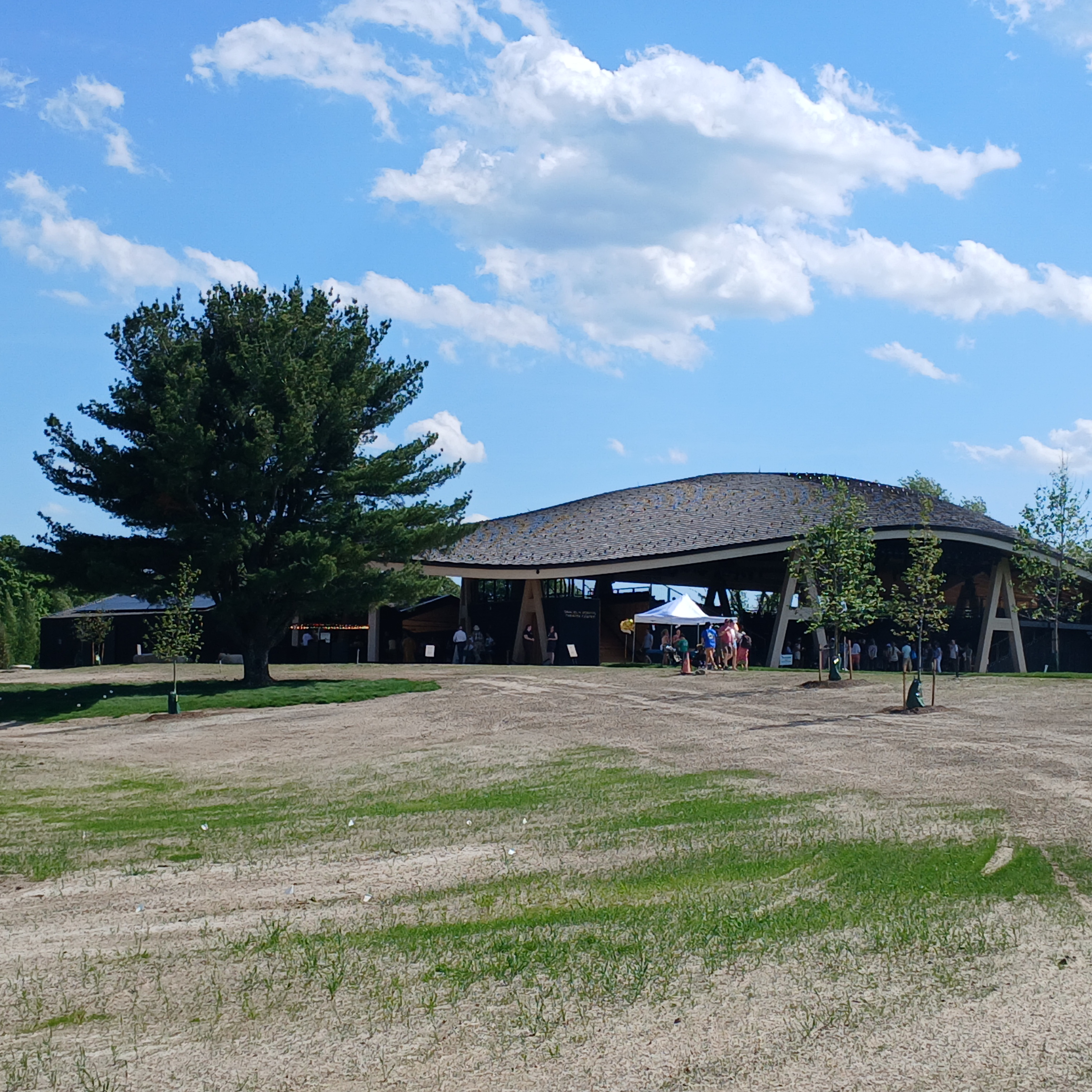
The Hudson Valley Shakespeare Theater which was built in 2026.

Hudson Valley Shakespeare (HVS) is a non-profit professional theater company based in Garrison, New York. The festival runs a roughly fourteen-week repertory season each year, operating under a large open-air theater tent. Its productions attract a total audience of about 50,000 from the Hudson Valley, New York City, and 40 US states. The company was known by the name "Hudson Valley Shakespeare Festival" until 2024, when they began constructing their first-ever permanent home, and removed the word "Festival" from their name.

HVS also performs William Shakespeare's works and live theater throughout the tri-state area by touring. The company has limited runs of its most popular programs through its "HVS On The Road" series and brings student-oriented productions and education programs to about 50,000 elementary, middle, and high school students and teachers each year. HVS's arts education programs also include training for early-career theater artists by way of its Conservatory Company, professional development for educators, and free audience engagement offerings before and after performances throughout the summer.

== History ==
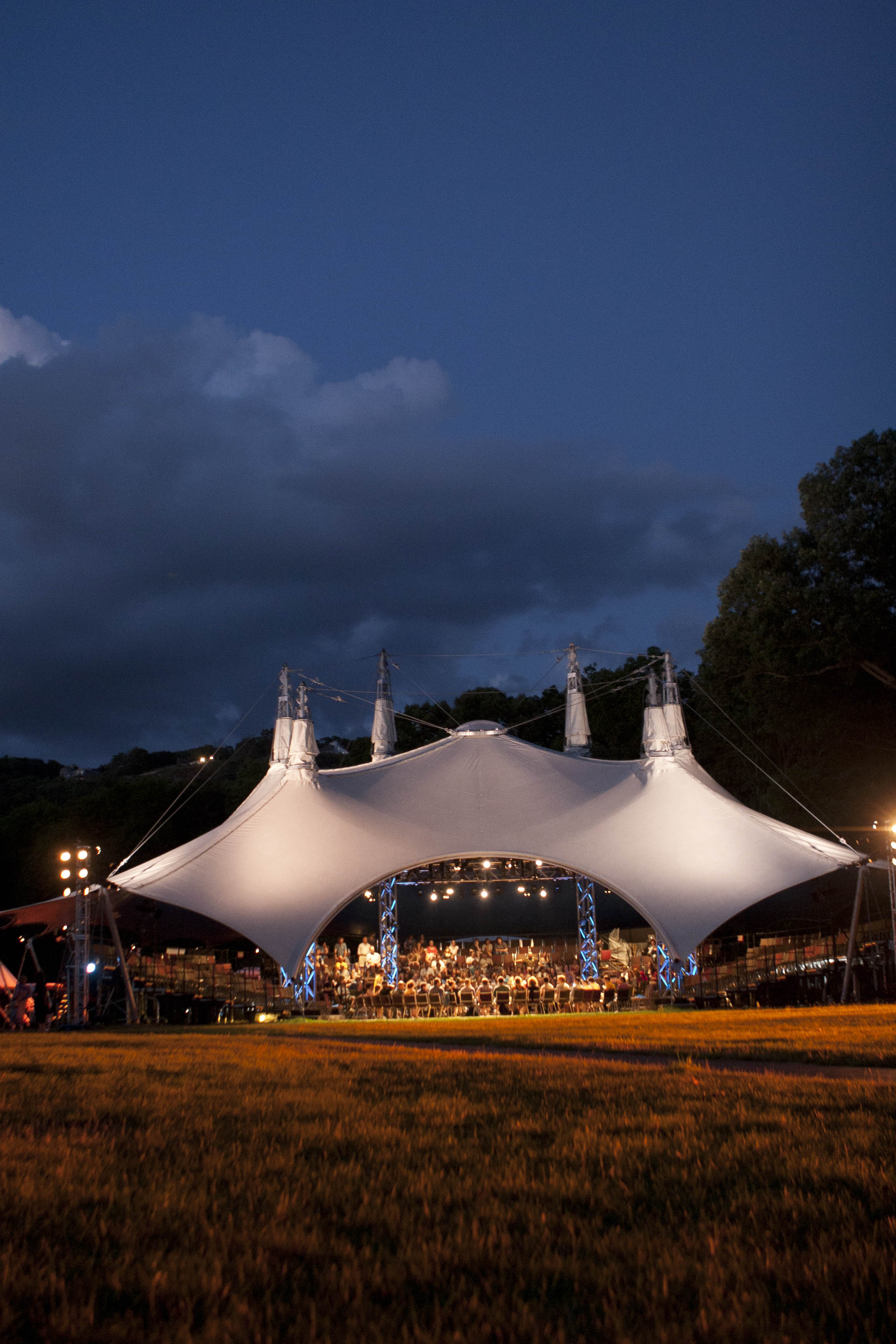
Hudson Valley Shakespeare's theater tent on the grounds of the Boscobel Mansion in 2010

HVS was founded by Melissa Stern and Terry O’Brien in September 1987 with an outdoor production of A Midsummer Night's Dream at Manitoga, home of industrial designer Russel Wright, in Garrison, New York. The following year, Boscobel House and Gardens agreed to host HVS's mainstage season on the estate's expansive grounds, and that summer's production of Shakespeare's As You Like It was performed under a tent overlooking the Hudson River.

In 1994, the festival added a second show to its season and began hands-on, performance-driven education programs within area schools. It also doubled the number of performances that year from 19 to 38.

In 2004, HVS began to tour productions to middle and high schools. In 2006, HVS acquired a custom-designed, open-air theater tent with seating for 540.

Hudson Valley Shakespeare was the subject of a one-hour documentary and two hour film of a performance of Twelfth Night which premiered on the PBS affiliate WNET on September 18, 2008. The program also aired on WLIW.

Terry O’Brien led the theater for 27 years, directing more than 30 productions, and stepped down as Artistic Director in December 2013.

After a search for his successor, HVS's Board of Directors appointed Davis McCallum as Artistic Director in May 2014.

In 2016, HVS produced a community-driven production of Thornton Wilder's Our Town with a cast of about 40 citizen actors from the Hudson Valley region, directed by John Christian Plummer.

In 2017, HVS mounted its first new plays: Pride and Prejudice by Kate Hamill adapted from the novel by Jane Austen, and Lauren Gunderson's The Book of Will.

In 2021, HVS mounted the 2013 James Ijames play The Most Spectacularly Lamentable Trial of Miz Martha Washington.

== Location ==
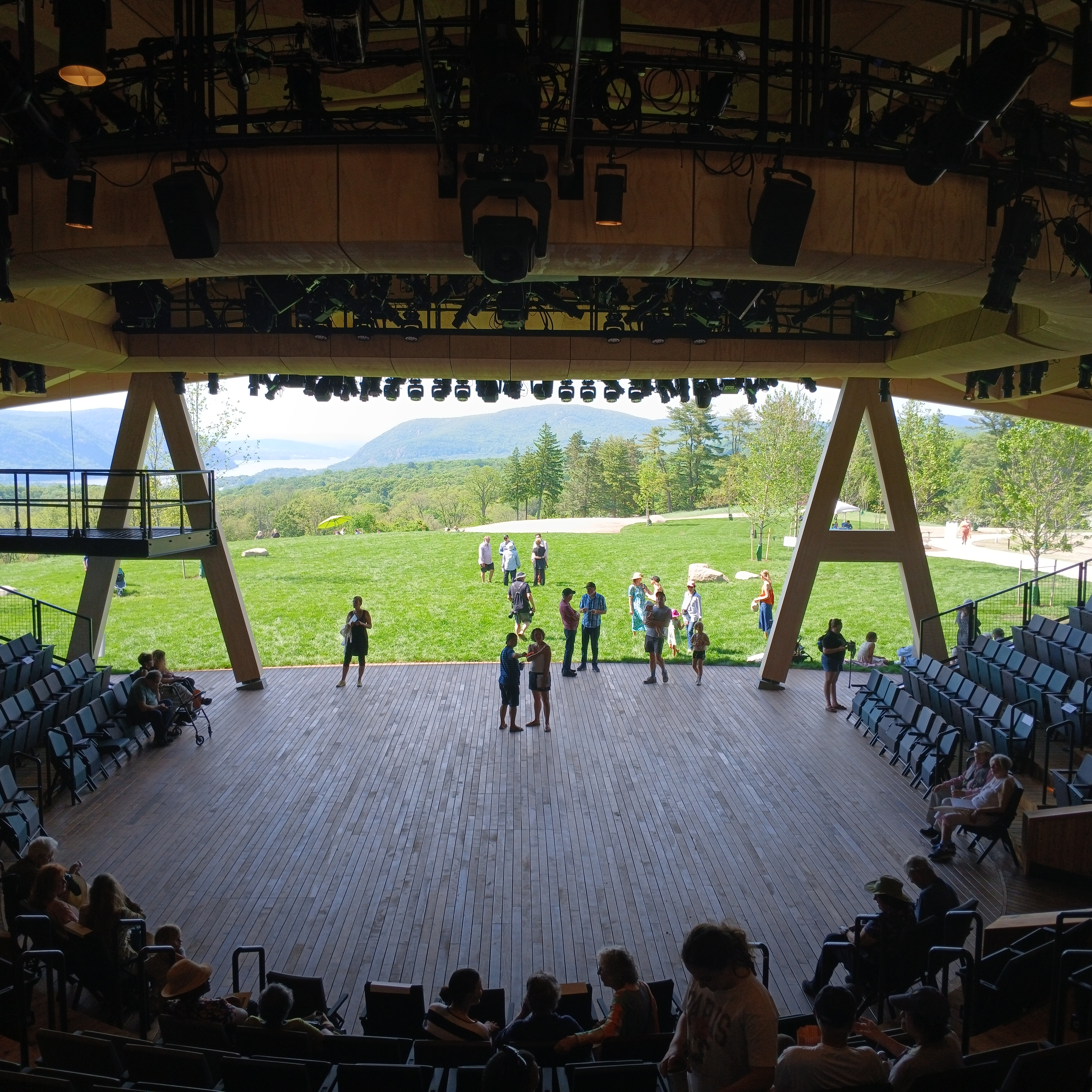
View of the stage of the Hudson Valley Shakespeare Festival theater with Storm King Mountain, the Hudson River, and Breakneck Ridge in the background.

HVS known for its scenic backdrop, overlooking the Hudson River, Storm King Mountain, and Breakneck Ridge. According to Ben Brantley of The New York Times, "nature and Shakespeare are the stars" in this festival.

From 1988 to 2021, excluding the 2020 season due to the COVID-19 pandemic, plays were performed in an open-air theater tent on the grounds of Boscobel Mansion. The stage, a rough patch of dirt that was on the same level as the first few rows of the audience, receding into lawns with a view of the Hudson River and West Point in the distance. The company used the vast open space behind the stage as scenery for the plays.

In August 2020, the company received a gift of a land parcel of 50 acres in Garrison and moved to that location for the 2022 season. In September 2024, HVSF broke ground on the Samuel H. Scripps Theater Center, a summer performance space with open sides that opened in May 2026.

== Recognition ==
More than 500,000 patrons have been served since HVS's first season in 1987.

HVS was named among The New York Times' "50 Essential Summer Festivals" in 2016, was Hudson Valley Magazine's 2016 Editors’ Pick for Best Summer Theater, and was nominated for a Drama League Award for its 2015 production of A Midsummer Night's Dream.

It produces classic and new works with an economy of style, focusing on script, actors and audience with the Hudson River and Hudson Highlands as its set and setting. The Wall Street Journal called it "the most purely enjoyable summer Shakespeare festival in America," while The New York Times commented: "If anyone wonders about the future of live theater or asks where the audience is, the answer is 'Under that tent.'"

== Education programs ==
In addition to its summer productions, HVS sponsors year-round education programs to about 50,000 students and teachers annually. These programs include in-school residencies and theater arts workshops for students, resource workshops for educators, a fall touring production for students in grades K-5, a spring touring production for students in grades 6-12, its annual Shakespeare Summer Camp for ages 8–16, and the Teachers' Shakespeare Institute. HVS's Conservatory Company, a performance based training program for 6 to 8 early career actors, offers on- and off-stage opportunities to work alongside HVS's acting company.

== Plays performed ==
- 1987: A Midsummer Night's Dream
- 1988: As You Like It
- 1989: Twelfth Night
- 1990: Much Ado About Nothing
- 1991: Romeo and Juliet
- 1992: The Taming of the Shrew
- 1993: The Merry Wives of Windsor
- 1994: Macbeth, The Comedy of Errors
- 1995: The Tempest, The Two Gentlemen of Verona
- 1996: A Midsummer Night's Dream, Love's Labour's Lost
- 1997: Tartuffe, As You Like It
- 1998: A Winter's Tale, Much Ado About Nothing
- 1999: Titus Andronicus, Twelfth Night
- 2000: Measure for Measure, Taming of the Shrew
- 2001: Merchant of Venice, Romeo and Juliet
- 2002: Henry V, The Comedy of Errors
- 2003: All's Well That Ends Well, Antony and Cleopatra
- 2004: Macbeth, The Merry Wives of Windsor
- 2005: The Tempest, The Two Gentlemen of Verona
- 2006: A Midsummer Night's Dream, The Rivals
- 2007: Richard III, As You Like It
- 2008: Cymbeline, Twelfth Night, Shakespeare Abridged
- 2009: Pericles, Much Ado About Nothing, Shakespeare Abridged
- 2010: Troilus and Cressida, The Taming of the Shrew, Bomb-itty of Errors
- 2011: Hamlet, The Comedy of Errors, Around the World in 80 Days
- 2012: Love's Labour's Lost, Romeo and Juliet, The 39 Steps
- 2013: King Lear, All's Well That Ends Well, The Three Musketeers
- 2014: Othello, Two Gentleman of Verona, The Liar
- 2015: The Winter's Tale, A Midsummer Night's Dream, The Arabian Nights, An Iliad
- 2016: As You Like It, Macbeth, Measure for Measure, Our Town
- 2017: Twelfth Night, Kate Hamill's Pride and Prejudice, The Book of Will, Love's Labour's Lost, The General from America
- 2018: Richard II, Taming of the Shrew, The Heart of Robin Hood, Rip Van Winkle; Or, Cut the Old Moon Into Stars, The Sea-Maid’s Music
- 2019: Much Ado About Nothing, Cymbeline, Cyrano, Into the Woods
- 2021: Macbeth, The Most Spectacularly Lamentable Trial of Miz Martha Washington, The Tempest
- 2022: Romeo & Juliet, Mr. Burns, A Post-Electric Play, Where We Belong
- 2023: Henry V; Love's Labor's Lost; Penelope
- 2024: Medea: Re-Versed, The Murder of Roger Ackroyd, By The Queen
- 2025: The Comedy of Errors, The Matchmaker, Octet, Julius Caesar
- 2026: As You Like It, King Lear, Les Miserables
