= Juan Montoya (interior designer) =

Colombian-born American architect and interior designer

- Born: Colombia
- Education: Parsons School of Design, New York City
- Website: www.juanmontoyadesign.com

Juan Montoya is a Colombian-born architect based in the United States, who specializes in residential interior design. His career began in the 1970s in New York City, and he has been recognized as a minimalist designer of modern homes with an eclectic style.

== Career ==
Juan Montoya was born in Colombia and studied architecture in Bogotá and at Parsons School of Design in New York, where he received an honorary doctorate. He founded his practice in New York in 1978 and undertakes projects world-wide. As well as designing interior spaces, his firm also deals with furniture and carpet design. His firm is currently headquartered in East 59th Street, New York.

His designs are characterized as bold, minimal and relaxed and he states that he is influenced by the work of Jean-Michel Frank and Émile-Jacques Ruhlmann as well as Gunnar Asplund, Louis Kahn, and Emilio Terry. He often employs Art Deco designs and Greek elements as well as Mayan style details.

== Projects ==
One of his early works, undertaken at age 34 in 1979, was the restoration of a Greenwich Village apartment building. The extensive renovation was commissioned by a couple who selected Montoya to undertake the renovation of the Queen Anne Style apartment, despite his reputation as a modernist designer. His material sample submissions consisted of white, bright red, gray flannel and green velvet as well as exposed brick and modern furnishings. More recent projects include the Lucullan office at the Medallion Financial Corporation and Caribbean style residences in the Dominican Republic and New York.

== Bibliography ==
Three collections of his work have been published, including La Formentera, which documents the design of his own home near Garrison, New York and Juan Montoya, which is a collection of his works.
