= Ward Pound Ridge Reservation =

Park in Westchester County

- IUCN category V (protected landscape/seascape)
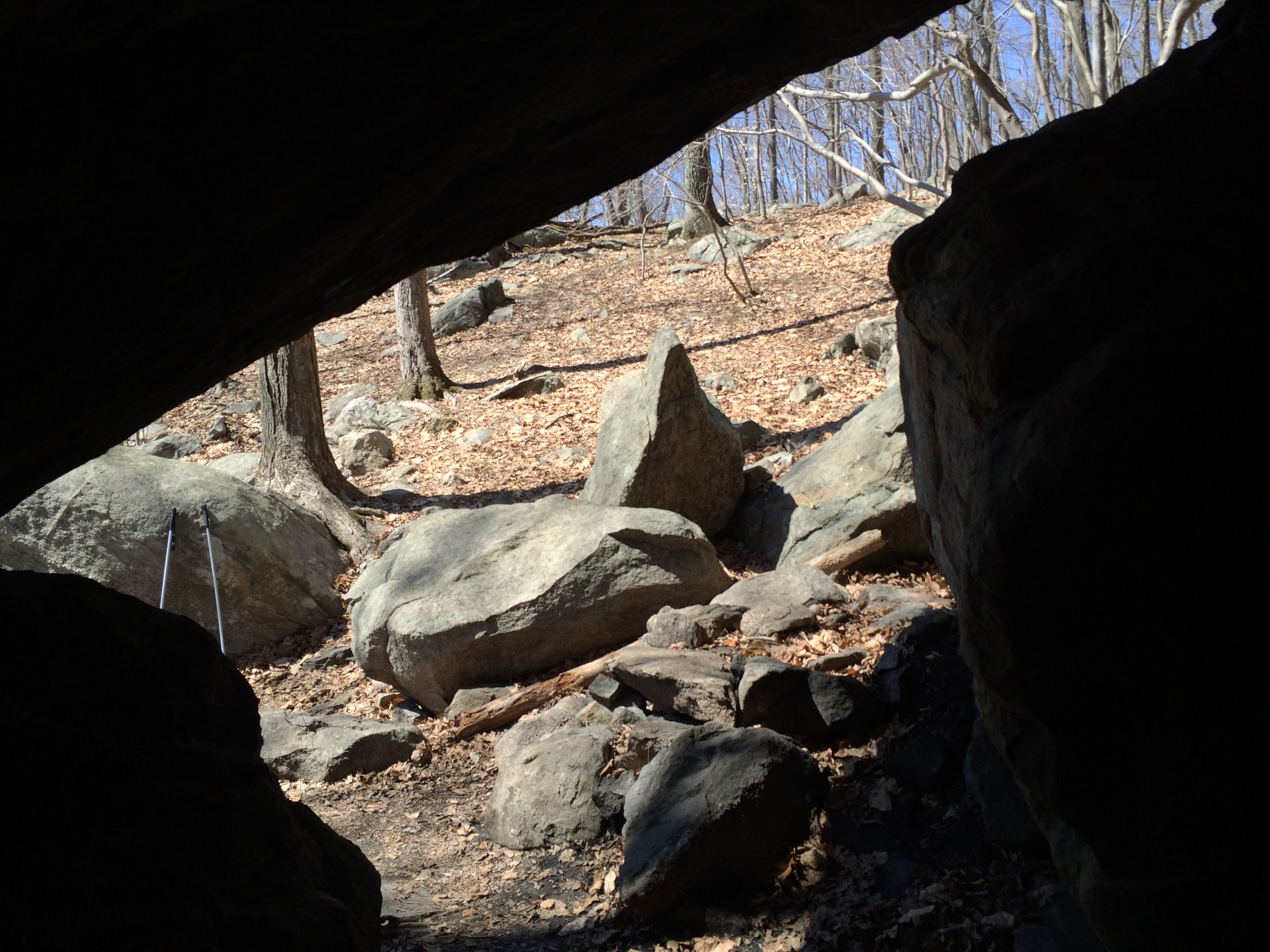
- View from inside Leatherman Cave
- Interactive map of Ward Pound Ridge Reservation
- Location: Pound Ridge and Lewisboro, Westchester County, New York, U.S.
- Coordinates: 41.2487°N 73.5887°W
- Area: 4,400 acres (18 km^{2})
- Established: 1925
- Governing body: Westchester County Department of Parks
- Website: parks.westchestergov.com/ward-pound-ridge-reservation

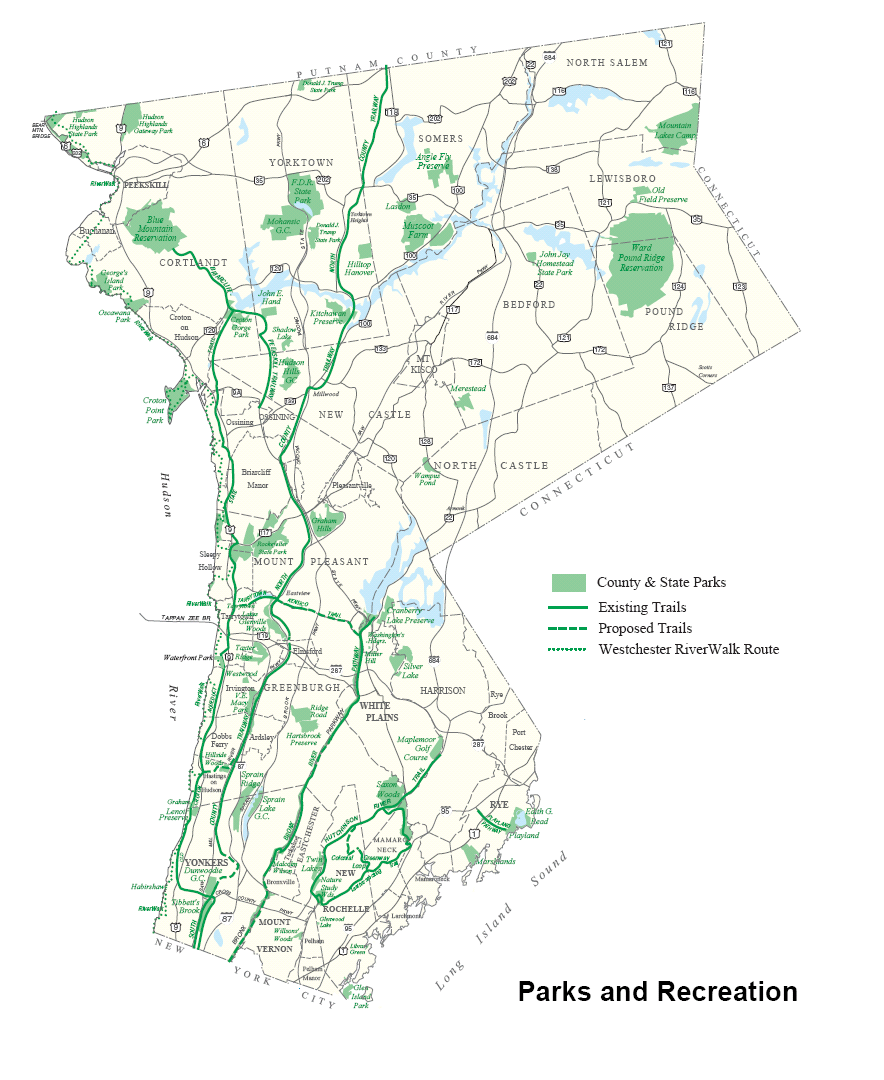
Parks in Westchester County, New York

The Ward Pound Ridge Reservation is a 4,400-acre (1,800 ha) county park located in the towns of Pound Ridge and Lewisboro in Westchester County, New York. It is the largest park in the county and offers diverse terrain, extensive hiking trails, nature programs, and recreational facilities.

== History ==
Originally part of the Cortlandt Manor land grant, the area began as farmland in the early 1700s.

In 1925, Westchester County acquired over 4,000 acres (1,600 ha) to form Pound Ridge Reservation. It was renamed in 1938 to honor William L. Ward, the county park supervisor and key parks advocate.

From 1933 to 1940, it hosted a Civilian Conservation Corps (CCC) camp (SP‑9 / Camp Merkel), where workers constructed trails, picnic shelters, bridges, and the Trailside Museum.

== Geography and ecology ==
Spanning nearly 7 sq mi (1,800 ha), the reservation includes mixed hardwood forests, streams, wetlands, and sandstone ridges. It contains over 35 miles of marked trails used for hiking, cross‑country skiing, horseback riding, and mountain biking.

Landmarks include:

- Trailside Nature Museum: a nature education center built by the CCC, showcasing native wildlife.
- Boutonville Oak: an ancient oak tree of local legend and ecological significance.

== Recreation and facilities ==
The park supports year-round activities:

- over 35 mi (56 km) of multi-use trails
- Cross‑country skiing and snow‑shoeing in winter
- Camping with lean‑tos and vintage CCC-era shelters
- Fishing, picnicking, and educational programming at the Trailside Museum

It is also host to several organized events and athletic competitions, including the annual Leatherman's Loop, a 6.2 mi (10 km) trail race.

== Ecological importance ==
A large and contiguous wildland buffer near suburban areas, the reservation provides habitat for various wildlife species and helps preserve region-wide ecological connectivity.

== In popular culture ==
- Scenes from the 1976 film Marathon Man and the 1997 HBO movie, In the Gloaming, were filmed within its grounds.
- Local folklore includes legends such as the Boutonville Oak haunting.

== See also ==
- Pound Ridge, New York
