= Trailside Museum =

Coordinates: 41.2575°N 73.589°W

Ward Pound Ridge Reservation's Trailside Museum, sometimes called the Trailside Nature Museum dates to 1937 when its original building was constructed by the Civilian Conservation Corps. It was further expanded in 1977. The museum, potentially one of the oldest of its kind in the United States, is also home to the Delaware Indians Research Center. Mastodon fossils found in the area were displayed in the museum in the late 1970s.
