= Lime Hollow =

Protected area in New York, US

- Location within New York
- Location: Cortland County, New York
- Nearest city: Cortland
- Coordinates: 42°34′10″N 76°15′07″W
- Area: 400 acres (1.6 km^{2})
- Established: 1993
- Website: www.limehollow.org

The Lime Hollow Center for Environment and Culture (Lime Hollow) is a nature preserve project in Cortland County, New York. It was founded in 1993 as the Lime Hollow Nature Center, the culmination of efforts 20 years earlier to develop a nature preserve to protect an unusual assemblage of marl ponds, a peat bog, and kame-and-kettle topography along an abandoned railroad right of way in Lime Hollow, just west of the city of Cortland.

== History ==
Lime Hollow, through a renewable use agreement, began by utilizing 100 acres (0.40 km^{2}) of land and two buildings belonging to the Tunison Laboratory of Aquatic Science of the US Geological Survey. Lime Hollow purchased an additional 190 acres (0.77 km^{2}) adjoining the Tunison property in 1998, partly funded with a grant from the New York State Clean Air/Clean Water Bond Act. The area included a four-acre (16,000 m^{2}) pond, beaver pond, old fields, and woodlands.

During 2002, the name of the center was changed to Lime Hollow Center for Environment and Culture. A new logo was created to better express the mission of the center, including an emphasis on providing cultural education programs in addition to environmental education programs. Lime Hollow opened a $1 million Visitor Center facility located on McLean Road in May 2007. The Visitor Center has a central exhibit space, a bird education room, several modular educational displays, gift-shop, staff offices, and numerous green building features. Outside, the center features a creek-side bird sanctuary - and, a key new addition to the center - a "Trail For All" designed to give people with disabilities easy access to one of the center's groomed trails.

== Ecosystem ==
The Lime Hollow Center for Environment and Culture is home to a very diverse ecosystem. The kame-and-kettle topography was created by glacial movement, making it so that the land is very undulated. Due to the nature of the topography, Lime Hollow possess several unique habitats. Among them are marl ponds, small ponds containing deposits of mudstone with high amounts of calcium, and a peat bog, an area where dead vegetation has been compressed by water pressure creating a wetland environment.

== Flora and fauna ==
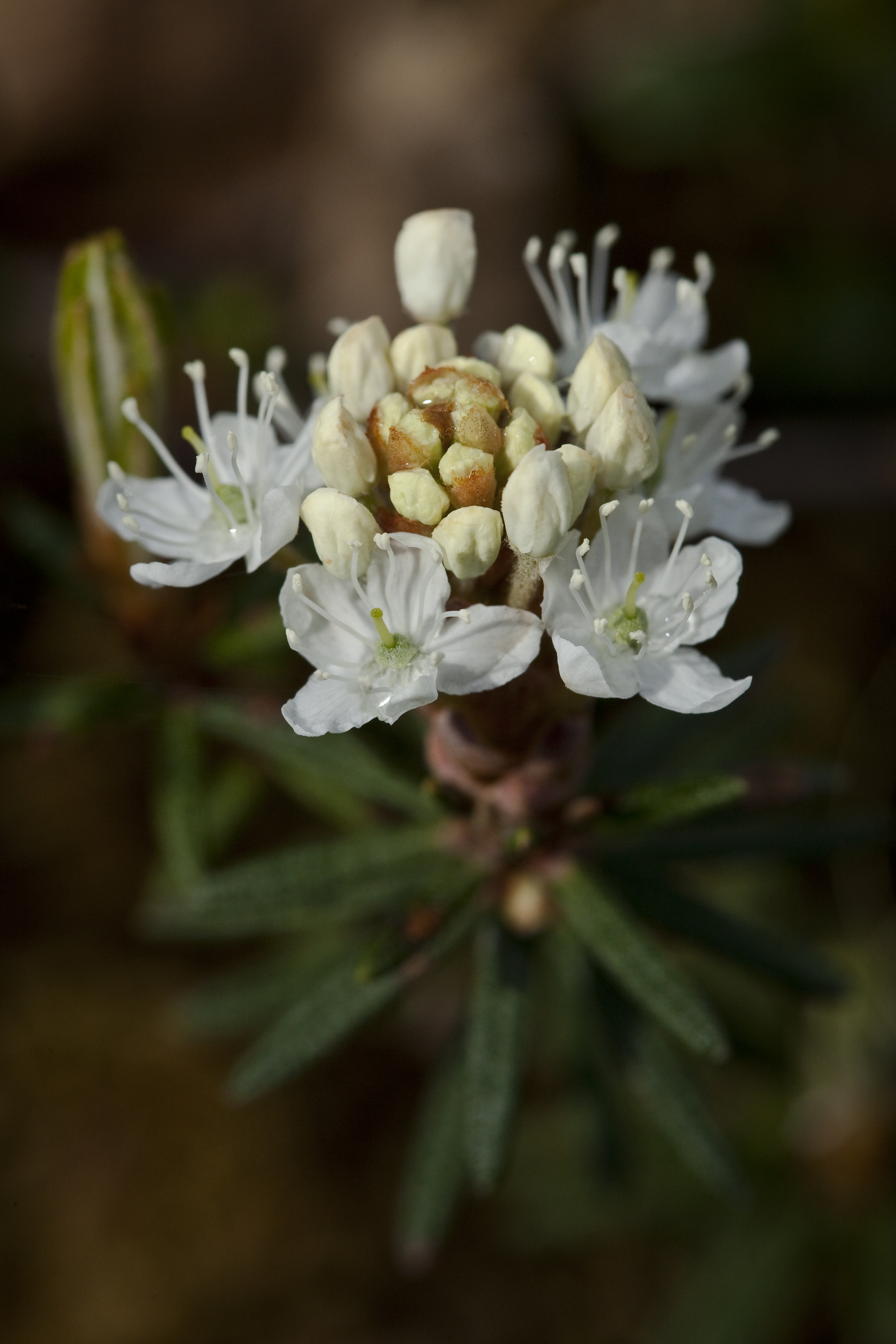
Labrador Tea

Within the wide range of habitats existing in Lime Hollow there are wide variety plant and animal species. The peat bog is home to a wide swathe of Labrador tea (Ledum groenlandicum), an acid-loving plant whose growth season is in the spring. There are also a wide variety of animal species including muskrats, beavers, and white-tailed deer.

== Educational programs and opportunities ==
Lime Hollow boasts several summer programs that are both educational and recreational. Among these, Nature's Keepers is a program specifically targeted towards 3- to 5-year-olds and teaching them the value of spending time in a natural environment. In addition to the summer programs, local schools frequently send field trip groups to the center throughout the year. This is supported through the contributions of the Cortland Community Foundation, which granted $10,000 to be used in the 2010-2011 and 2011-2012 school years. In recent years, through a collaboration between Lime Hollow and OCM BOCES a new environmental education center was constructed. The center plays host to OCM BOCES science classes for 40 weeks out of the year, and then to summer camps for another 10 weeks.

== Recreation ==
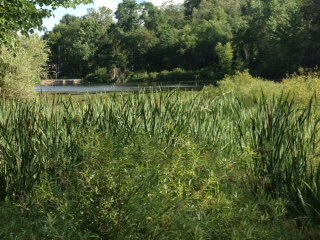
Chicago Bog

Lime Hollow has developed nearly 10 miles (16 km) of walking trails, several wildlife viewing stations, and over 375 acres (1.52 km^{2}) of land. Lime Hollow offers walking and hiking opportunities year-round, while winter allows for snowshoeing and cross-country skiing. A local geocaching group has established several locations on and off the trails. Lime Hollow also boasts unique topographical features, like the Chicago Bog on the Phillips Memorial trail, which is one of the few existing peat bogs in the Finger Lakes region.
