= Cold Spring, New York =

- Village
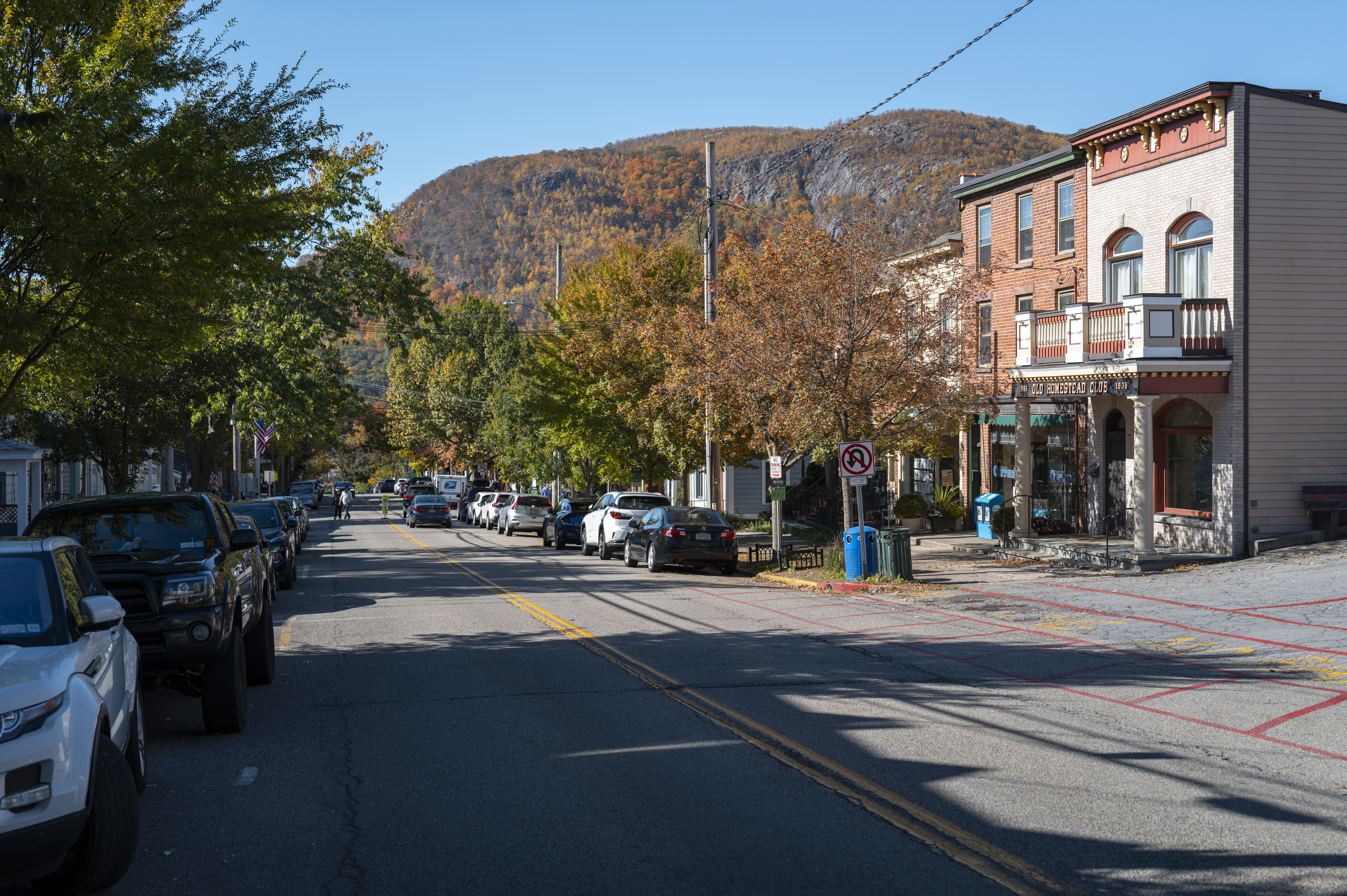
- Main Street in Cold Spring, part of the Cold Spring Historic District

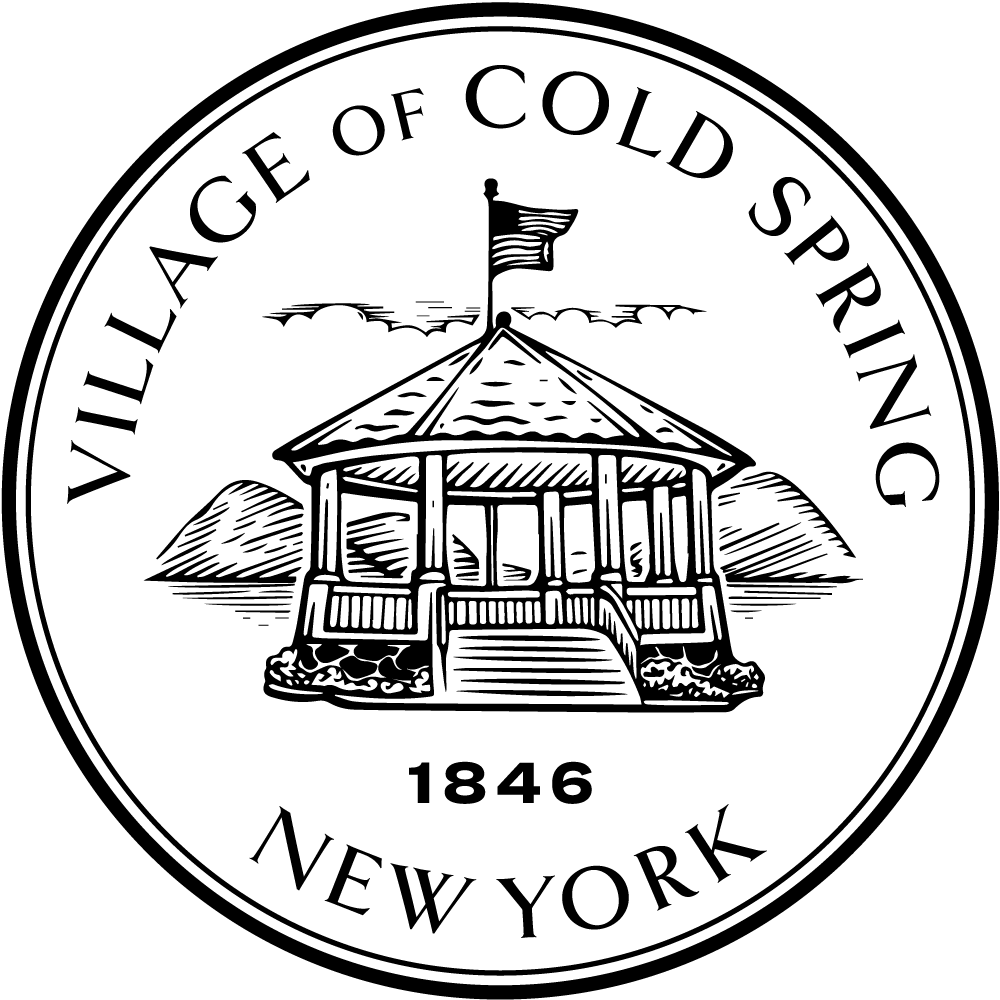
- Seal

- Location of Cold Spring in Putnam County and of Putnam County in New York
- Coordinates: 41°25′8″N 73°57′16″W
- Country: United States
- State: New York
- County: Putnam
- Incorporated: 1846

Government
  - Mayor: Kathleen E. Foley

Area
  - Total: 0.60 sq mi (1.55 km^{2})
  - Land: 0.59 sq mi (1.54 km^{2})
  - Water: 0.0039 sq mi (0.01 km^{2}) 0.91%
- Elevation: 108 ft (33 m)

Population (2020)
  - Total: 1,986
  - Density: 3,345.0/sq mi (1,291.51/km^{2})
- Postal code: 10516
- Area code(s): 329, 845
- FIPS code: 36-16936
- Website: coldspringny.gov

Cold Spring is a village in the town of Philipstown in Putnam County, New York, United States. The population was 1,986 at the 2020 census. It borders the smaller village of Nelsonville and the hamlets of Garrison and North Highlands. The central area of the village is on the National Register of Historic Places as the Cold Spring Historic District due to its many well-preserved 19th-century buildings, constructed to accommodate workers at the nearby West Point Foundry, a Registered Historic Place. The town is the birthplace of General Gouverneur K. Warren, who was an important figure in the Union Army during the Civil War.

Commuter service to New York City is available via the Cold Spring train station, served by Metro-North Railroad. The train journey is approximately one hour, ten minutes to Grand Central Terminal.

The village, located in the Hudson Highlands, sits at the deepest point of the Hudson River, directly across from West Point. The town and its surrounding landscape has been a popular subject for Hudson River School painters.

== History ==
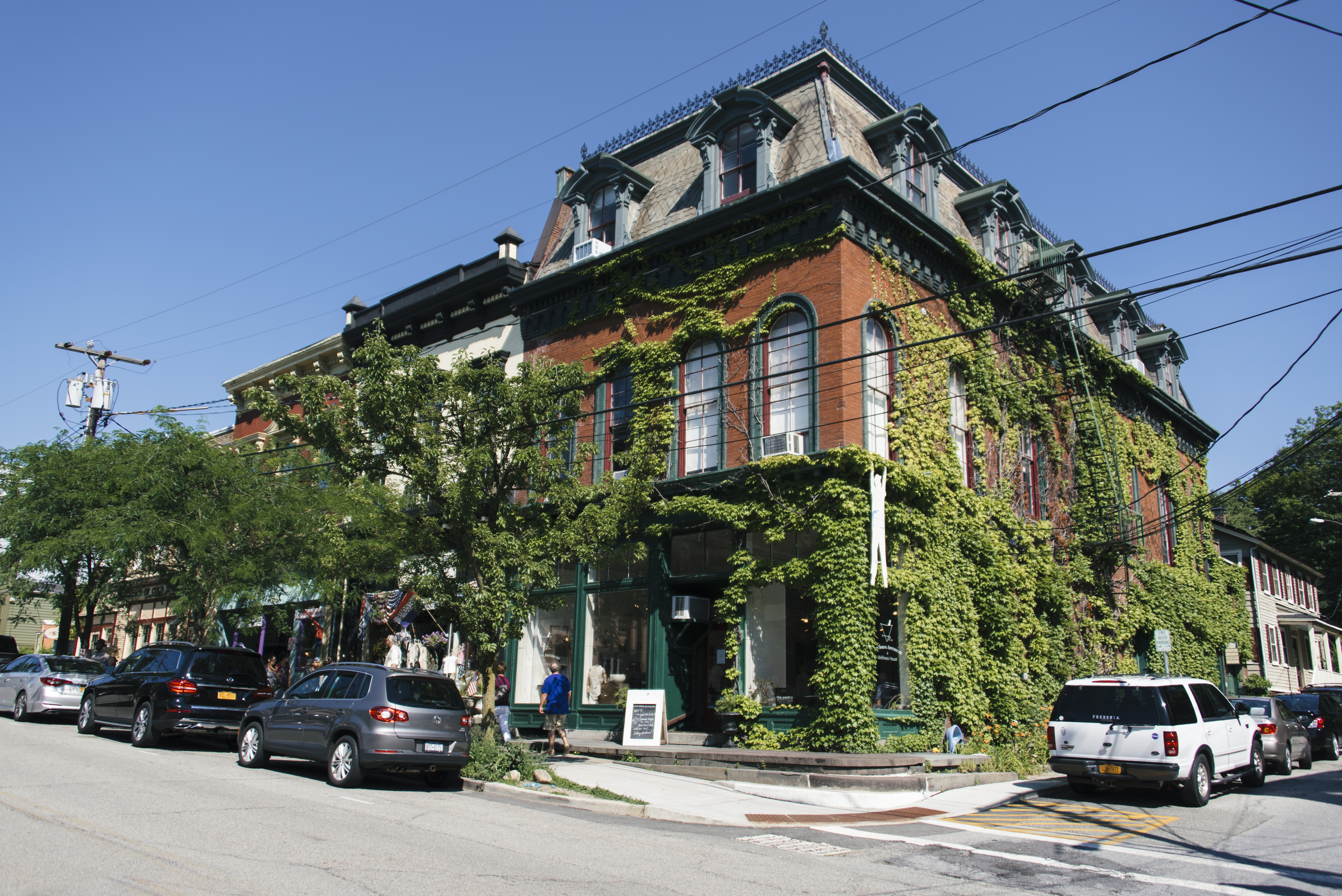
Main Street

=== Early history ===
On July 15, 1691, Dortlandt and Sybrant secured a deed to the tract from Wappinger leaders, totaling as many as 17,480 acres (according to recent historical analysis) along the eastern bank of the Hudson River from the peak on Anthony's Nose to (and including) Pollepel Island, and east to a marked tree which would establish the tract's eastern border. This tract contained a large portion of modern-day Philipstown, New York, including the entire Village of Cold Spring.

While many land transactions in colonial America were disputed by settlers and natives, the original lands deeded to Dortlandt and Sybrant (containing the Village of Cold Spring) appear to have been legitimately obtained with the consent of the Wappinger. This is evidenced by testimony from Wappinger leader Daniel Nimham, who, in 1765, sought the assistance of the New York Common Council (and eventually the British Crown) in resolving land disputes over land claimed both by the heirs of Adolph Philipse and Wappinger natives. In this testimony, Nimham states that Wappinger ancestors had sold a tract of "Low Lands on that Part of the Peeks kill [north of modern-day Annsville Creek] ... and also a pine swamp containing ... a few Acres called Kichtondacongh and a piece of low Land lying Southeasterly from Kichtondacongh called Paukeminshingh." Nimham goes on to contest the sale of any land beyond this initial tract deeded by the Wappinger to Dortlandt and Sybrant, however, recognizes the initial transaction of land (including present-day Cold Spring) as legitimately ceded by the Wappinger to the Dutch.

=== Permanent settlements ===
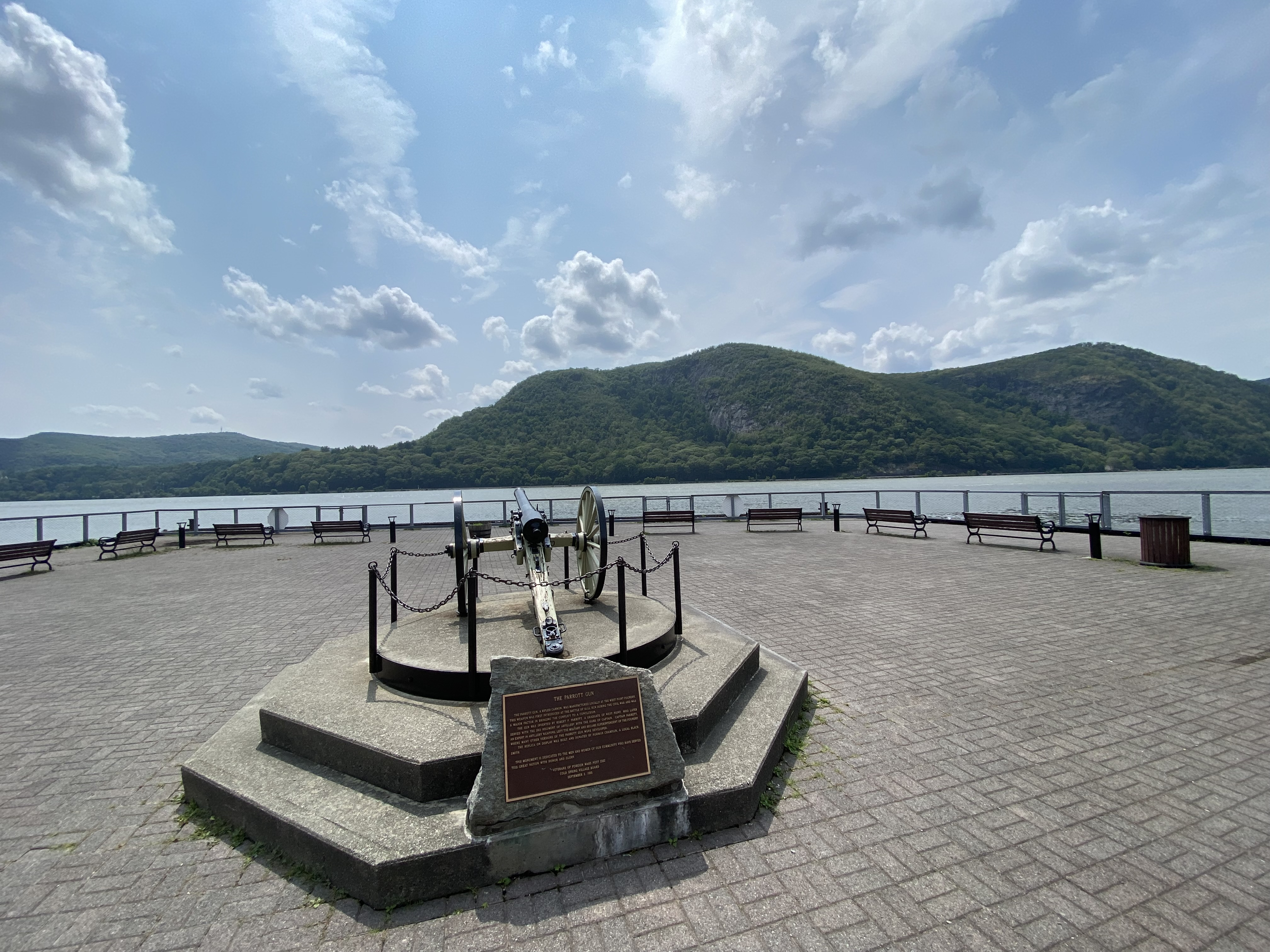
Parrott Rifle as seen at the Landing

The first permanent settler in the village of Cold Spring was Merrick Williams in 1730. In 1772, a highway master was chosen for the road from Cold Spring to the Post Road from New York to Albany. Prior to Williams presence, the land was woodlands. A small trading hamlet grew alongside the river by the early 1800s. A couple of sloops made regular weekly trips from Cold Spring to New York, carrying wood and some country produce, which came over this model road from the east. Those trips by sloop usually took a week.

==== The West Point Foundry ====
In 1818, Gouverneur Kemble established the West Point Foundry opposite West Point to produce artillery pieces for the United States Government. The nearby mountains contained veins of ore, and were covered with timber for fuel. A brook provided hydropower, and the Hudson a ready shipping outlet. In 1843, the Foundry built the USS Spencer, the first iron ship built in the United States. With the influx of workers at the Foundry, local housing, businesses and churches increased, and Cold Spring was incorporated as a village in 1846. The first President of the Village was Joshua Haight. The Foundry became famous for its production of Parrott rifles and other munitions during the Civil War, when the foundry grew to a sprawling 100-acre complex employing 1,400 workers. It also manufactured cast iron steam engines for locomotives, gears, and produced much of the pipework for New York's water system. The rise of steel making and the declining demand for cast iron after the Civil War caused the Foundry to cease operations in 1911.

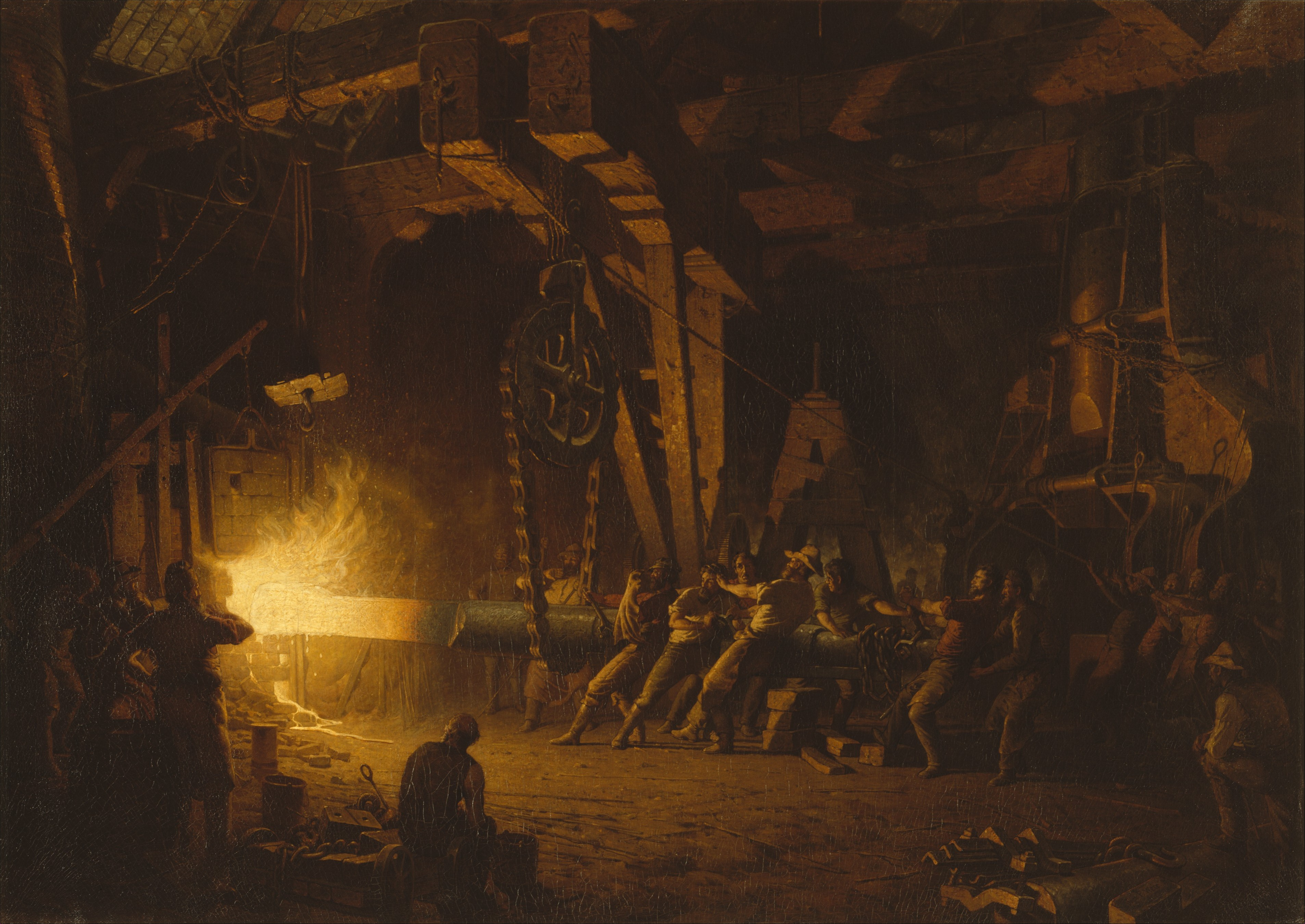
Forging the Shaft. A scene from the West Point Foundry in Cold Spring

On January 22, 1896, local businessmen of Cold Spring formed a fire brigade known as the Cold Spring Hose Company, No.1. A horse-drawn hook-and-ladder was donated in 1899. The Municipal Building, designed by Louis Mekeel, was constructed in 1926 to house the company's first fire truck, an American LaFrance. The company, renamed Cold Spring Fire Company No.1 in 1900, serves the Villages of Cold Spring, Nelsonville and a district in the Town of Philipstown.

Mr. Willis Buckner, a former slave from the South, was a driver and groom for Susan and Anna Bartlett Warner at their farm on Constitution Island. Mr. Buckner taught Sunday School at the Methodist Church. In the early decades of the 20th century, blacks who stayed in this part of New York state migrated away from rural towns to nearby cities with waterfront manufacturing such as Peekskill, Beacon, Newburgh and Ossining. During the 1920s, the Ku Klux Klan had a presence in Cold Spring as well as Fishkill and Nelsonville.

Pete Seeger formed the Clearwater organization, an environmental group dedicated to advances in sewer treatment, industrial waste disposal, and addressing the discharge of major pollutants into the Hudson. In 1970, the sloop Clearwater docked for a songfest at Cold Spring. As Seeger appeared on stage to thank the audience for coming, fifteen drunks stood up waving little American flags, yelling "Throw the Commies out." That night someone cut the sloop's moorings and there were threats to torch the boat. All of this created tension within the Clearwater organization.

=== Country estates ===
Towards the latter part of the nineteenth century artists, writers and prominent families came to Cold Spring, and mansions were built along Morris Avenue, including "Undercliff", the home of publisher George Pope Morris, and "Craigside", the home of Julia and General Daniel Butterfield. To the south, West Point Foundry employee Dr. Frederick Lente built "The Grove".

== Geography ==
The village is bordered by the Hudson River to the west, and is bound by the Hudson Highlands State Park to the north, where Mount Taurus and Breakneck Ridge rise out of the banks of the Hudson and form two basically parallel ridges that track each other inland. The valley between them has an abandoned dairy farm, two lakes, and a camp.

According to the United States Census Bureau, the village has a total area of 0.60 square miles (1.55 km^{2}), of which 0.59 square miles (1.54 km^{2}) is land and 0.004 square miles (0.01 km^{2}), or 0.91%, is water.

== Demographics ==
Historical population
Census	Pop.	Note	%±
1860	2,770		—
1870	3,086		11.4%
1880	2,111		−31.6%
1900	2,067		—
1910	2,549		23.3%
1920	1,433		−43.8%
1930	1,784		24.5%
1940	1,897		6.3%
1950	1,788		−5.7%
1960	2,083		16.5%
1970	2,083		0.0%
1980	2,161		3.7%
1990	1,998		−7.5%
2000	1,983		−0.8%
2010	2,013		1.5%
2020	1,986		−1.3%
U.S. Decennial Census

As of the census of 2020, there were 1,986 people, 834 households, and 834 families residing in the village. The population density was 3,300 inhabitants per square mile (1,300/km^{2}). The racial makeup of the village was 94% White, 0.49% African American, 0.44% Native American, 3.05% Asian, 2.12% from other races, and 0.08% from two or more races. Hispanic or Latino of any race were 0.07% of the population.

Out of the 834 households, 25.1% had children under the age of 18 living with them, 41.9% were married couples living together. The average household size was 2.13 and the average family size was 3.0.

The median income for a household in the village was $98,056 (an increase of 83.7% from 2010), and the median income for a family was $135,500 (an increase of 78.2% from 2010). About 8.4% of the population were below the poverty line, including 13.8% of those under age 18 and 4.4% of those age 65 or over.

== Arts and culture ==
=== Attractions ===
Main Street, located in the Cold Spring Historic District is a walkable, 19th century street home to a large number of unique boutiques, antique stores, restaurants, inns, coffee shops, and other independent businesses.

The Julia L. Butterfield Memorial Library was established in Cold Spring in 1925. The library is home to a small collection of paintings originally belonging to Butterfield, including A Pic-Nic on the Hudson and artifacts from the town's history.

The Cold Spring Film Society hosts a Summer Film Series, screening a curated collection of classic and contemporary films at Dockside Park on evenings in the summer.

Cold Spring hosts an annual Halloween Parade.

The West Point Foundry Preserve features the surviving administrative building and a variety of other ruins from the Foundry.

==== Museums ====
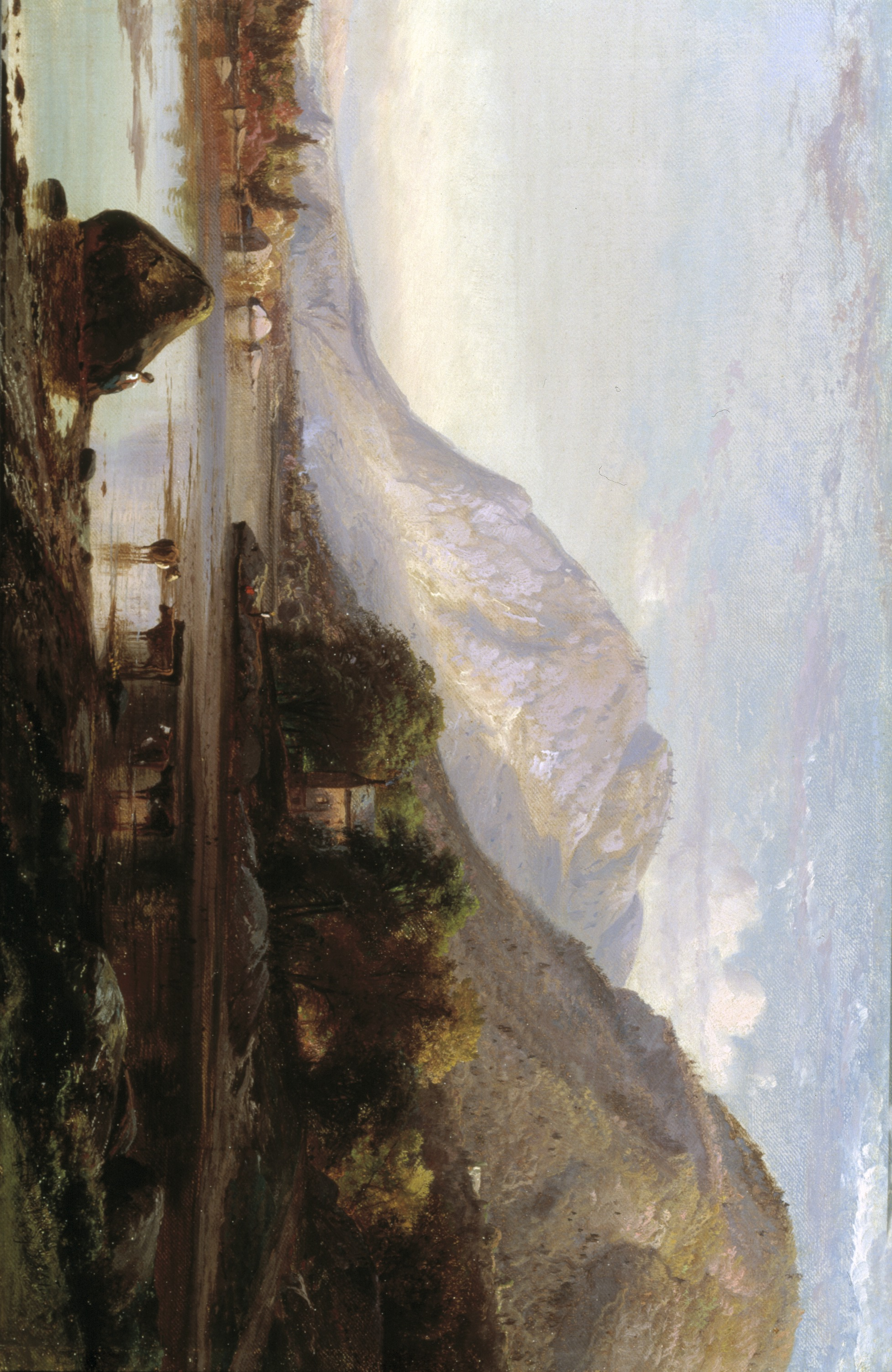
Hudson River at Cold Spring by Johann Hermann Carmiencke showing Breakneck Ridge and Bull Hill as seen from Cold Spring

Magazzino Italian Art is a museum and research center focused on Postwar and Contemporary Italian Art and features a herd of Sardinian donkeys.

The Putnam History Museum is a local history museum located near the West Point Foundry Preserve. Many artifacts from the West Point Foundry's history can be viewed at the Putnam History Museum on Chestnut Street. Built in 1830, the building was originally a one-room schoolhouse for the Foundry's teenage apprentices and the children of employees.

The natural landscape of the region has been depicted in works by Hudson River School painters.

=== Churches ===
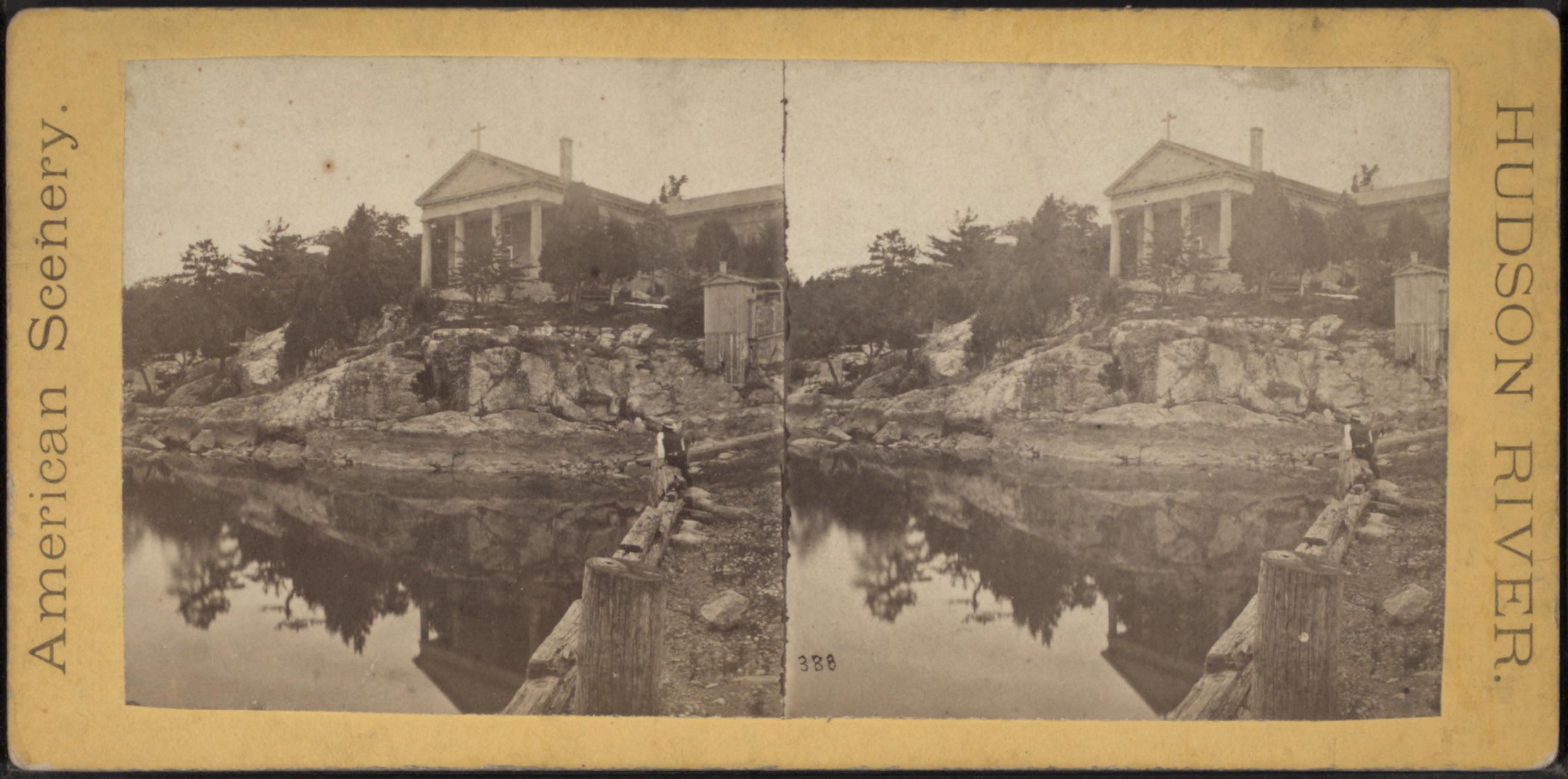
Our Lady church, circa 1855

In 1826, Union Church was built. By mutual agreement the Presbyterians used the building in the morning and the other religious groups in the afternoon. In 1830, the Baptists constructed a church on land donated by Samuel L. Gouverneur. The first Methodist church was built in 1833. The building was sold in 1870, and a new brick Italianate structure was built in 1868. The Dutch Reformed Church was built around 1855 in Neoclassical style. The building was later replaced by the Julia L. Butterfield Library.

Many of the workers at the Foundry were Irish immigrants. Our Lady of Loretto church was constructed in 1833 of locally made red brick covered with stucco. The church was abandoned in 1906 and fell into disrepair. It was repaired and re-dedicated in 1977.

Saint Mary's in the Highlands church was incorporated in 1840. A second, larger church was built in 1867, designed in the Victorian Gothic style by architect and vestry member George Edward Harney.

== Education ==
Public education is administered by the Haldane Central School District. The school teaches students grades K-12.

== Media ==
Cold Spring has two weekly newspapers: Highlands Current, founded in 2010 and formerly known as The Paper, and Putnam County News and Recorder, founded in 1868.

== Notable people ==
- Henrietta Ash Bancroft (1843-1929), professor and religious leader
- Gail Brown, actress
- Bob Duffy, college and pro basketball player, born in Cold Spring
- John H. Fenimore V (born 1941), Adjutant General of New York
- Scotti Hill, rock musician
- Rupert Holmes, composer, singer-songwriter, dramatist and author
- Albert L. Ireland, United States Marine
- Sean Patrick Maloney, former Congressman from New York's 18th Congressional District
- Jean Marzollo, writer, creator of the I Spy children's book series
- Don McLean, singer-songwriter, wrote "American Pie" and "Vincent" while living in Cold Spring, a photo of which is featured on the cover of his eponymous album
- Sarah P. Monks, California naturalist, born in Cold Spring
- Robert Parker Parrott, American soldier, superintendent of the West Point Foundry and inventor of the Parrott rifle
- Charlie Plummer, American actor, grew up in Cold Spring
- Emily Warren Roebling, first female field engineer of the Brooklyn Bridge
- Gouverneur K. Warren, American military commander during the Civil War and hero of the Battle of Gettysburg
