= Rock Lawn and Carriage House =

Historic house in New York, United States

- U.S. National Register of Historic Places
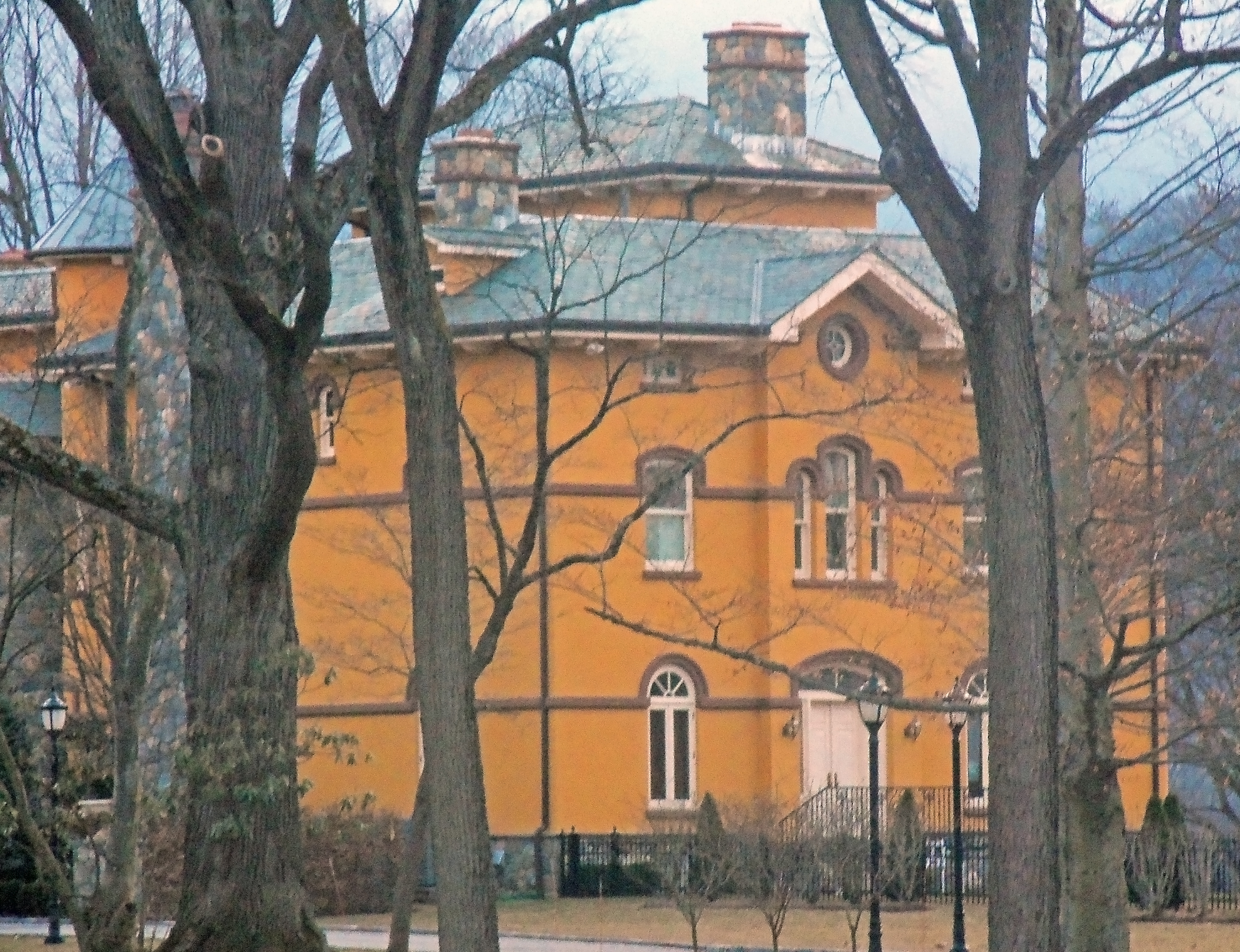
- North elevation and partial east profile in 2013, following renovation

- Location within New York Location within the United States
- Interactive map showing the location of Rock Lawn and Carriage House
- Location: Garrison, NY
- Nearest city: Peekskill
- Coordinates: 41°22′50″N 73°56′40″W
- Area: 12.3 acres (5.0 ha)
- Built: 1852–1853
- Architect: Richard Upjohn (house), Stanford White (carriage house)
- Architectural style: Colonial Revival, Italian Villa
- MPS: Hudson Highlands MRA
- NRHP reference No.: 82001254
- Added to NRHP: November 23, 1982

Rock Lawn is a historic house in Garrison, New York, United States. It was built in the mid-19th century from a design by architect Richard Upjohn. In 1982 it was listed on the National Register of Historic Places along with its carriage house, designed by Stanford White and built around 1880.

It is Upjohn's only house in the Italian villa style in the Hudson Highlands. Hamilton Fish II, a longtime member of the State Assembly and Putnam County's Republican Party chairman and de facto political boss, owned the house and lived there during the late 19th century; during that time sympathetic additions were made to the house by an unidentified architect. More recently it has been the home of Patty Hearst and her late husband Bernard Shaw. In the early 21st century it was renovated and remodeled.

== Buildings and grounds ==
The house and carriage house are located on a 12.3-acre (5.0 ha) lot in Garrison, an unincorporated hamlet of the town of Philipstown. It is located on Upper Station Road (County Route 14), approximately 500 feet (150 m) west of New York State Route 9D and 750 feet (230 m) east of the Hudson River, towards which the land slopes, then drops sharply, allowing a view across the river to the United States Military Academy at West Point, a National Historic Landmark. The landscape is largely cleared, with intermittent mature shade trees. Garrison's fire station is next door; a small Catholic church is across the road along with other large-lot houses. To the east and south are other residences.

Among the other buildings and structures in the area are others listed on the National Register. At the junction of Upper Station and NY 9D are the Arts and Crafts Garrison Union Free School with the Moore House behind it, and St. Philip's Church in the Highlands, also designed by Upjohn. Down the hill to the east at the riverside, the small Garrison Landing Historic District is across the railroad tracks, just north of the Garrison station on Metro-North Railroad's Hudson Line.

To the southeast, along Lower Station Road (County Route 12), is the Carpenter Gothic Wilson House. It completes the circuit back to NY 9D, at an intersection known as Garrison Four Corners, also the western terminus of short New York State Route 403. The Garrison Grist Mill Historic District occupies part of a local golf course, with the Mandeville House, a Dutch Colonial residence briefly remodeled by Upjohn, who lived there for the last years of his life. The Birches, an early work by Ralph Adams Cram, rounds out the collection of Register listings in that part of Garrison.

An iron fence runs along the north side of the property, next to the sidewalk along Upper Station. In its center a gated entrance allows access to a slightly meandering 200-foot (61 m) driveway that expands to a large carport nestling in the corner of the house's L-shaped footprint. A group of taller trees, including some newly planted 40-foot (12 m) silver lindens, set slightly back from the street and fence partially screen the house from the street; in the northwest corner these go all the way to the fence.

A small garden with elliptical walkway is located in front of the north facade of the house. To the east of the carport is a fenced-in modern kidney-shaped swimming pool with stone deck and inset whirlpool next to a rock outcrop that has been adapted to create a small waterfall flowing into the pool. South of it the driveway continues east to the carriage house, on its south side, then returns alongside the east fence to an auxiliary gate near the northeast corner. The south and west property lines are also fenced.

=== Main house ===
The house has a main block, a southern block, a wing connecting them and a garage wing on the east of the south block.

==== Main block ====
The main block is a two-story stucco-faced brick building with load-bearing walls on a stone foundation. Atop is a hip roof pierced by a single large stone chimney. On the west side a similar hip roof and chimney rise an additional story. At the southeast corner of the main block is a circular projecting bay with a conical roof.

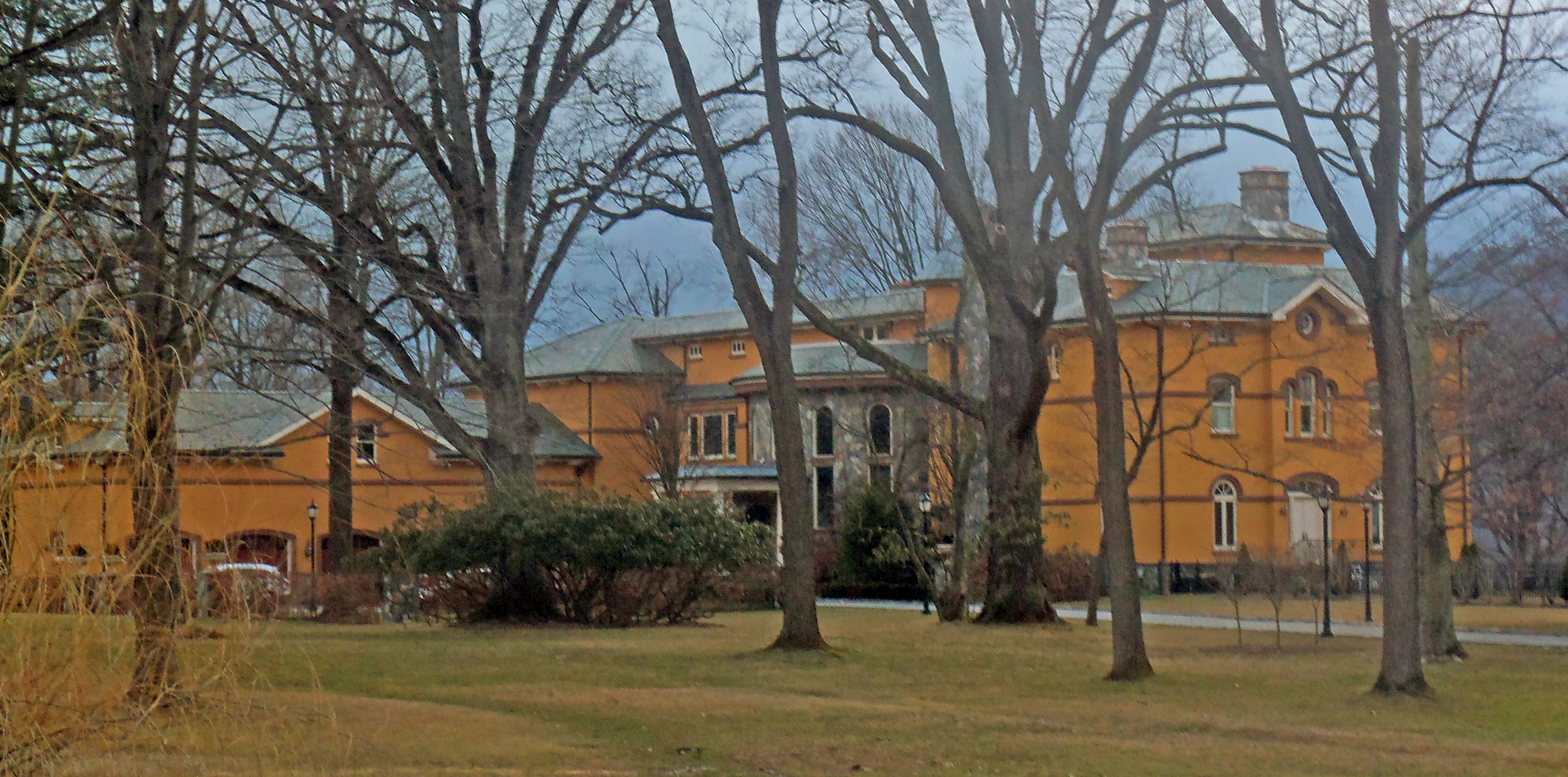
Main house from the northeast, 2013

The main entrance is located on a projecting bay in the center of the north (front) facade, forming a small pavilion. A small set of steps lead up to four-paneled wooden double doors with four-pane sidelights topped by a gently arched two-pane transom. It is topped by a sandstone beltcourse, which continues at the springline of the semicircular arches with radiating muntins atop the French windows on either side.

On the second story the fenestration consists of an arched six-over-one double-hung sash window flanked by two smaller and narrower versions. The side windows are arched one-over-one double-hung sash. The same sandstone course runs along the springlines and atop the arches.

The third story has a single round oculus framed in sandstone in the center of the projection's gabled roof. Underneath its broad eaves are fasciae, exposed rafters and returns. To the side are rectangular six-pane casement windows with sandstone lintels and sills.

The sandstone courses and arched windows continue on the western facade. South of the first bay on the first story, there is a semi-octagonal stone-faced projecting bay window with a wooden balustrade on top. Each facet has one single-pane window with a three-light transom. Double sliding glass doors open onto the balcony created by the balustrade. The bays on either side on both stories are set in arched one-over-one double-hung sash.

All three northern bays are on a projecting pavilion. To its south on the first story, double French doors, flanked by similar single doors, with three- and six-pane transoms open onto a set of stone steps. Above them there is a single arched one-over-one window near the southwest corner of the main block. A matching window on the east side is the only one on that entire facade.

==== Connecting wing ====
From the south elevation there projects a long wing. On its east it has a two-story semicircular stone portico with a shed roof. A flat roof on its east supported by four round wooden columns shelters a stone porch with steps and iron railings on either side. At the top is an arched double wooden door with ornate tracery inside a wooden surround. This is currently the house's main entrance.

Fenestration on the portico consists of two long windows on the first floor to either side of the entrance, with sandstone sills and lintels. On the second story the windows are round-arched with radiating muntins. The roof above them has broad overhanging eaves. To either side on both stories of the south wing are tripartite single-pane windows. Those on the first story have transoms with a single row of square panes.

On the west side the main block gives way to a stone-faced section centered on a two-story trapezoidal bay window, topped by a balustraded balcony accessed from a clerestory. The first story of the bay has a narrow French door at the top of stone steps flanked by two similar windows, all topped with a transom of three panes per window. On the facets and either side of the bay are similar single-pane windows with four-pane transoms.

The second story echoes the ground floor with four narrow, untransomed windows. The facets and north flanking windows follow this pattern, single panes like those below but without transoms. Below the south facet another balustrade springs, accessed by a door on the south flanking side.

The balcony connects to a projecting three-story engaged rectangular tower topped by a hipped roof pierced by a stone chimney, similar to the main block. Below the balcony, the first story has three French doors with sunburst-pattern transoms, also with stone steps. Two sandstone stringcourses also run around the tower. The upper one is the springline for the round arches on the third story's three narrow French doors that open onto a small balustraded balcony of their own.

At the end of the wing is a south block of roughly the same shape and size as the main block. The south facade is identically styled to the north facade of the main block. An area on its southwest has been fenced off for use as a dog run.

On the south block's west is an engaged two-and-a-half-story octagonal tower with gently pitched conical roof. Its first story has narrow French windows with radiating muntins in their round-arched transoms. They have sandstone sills and lintels; the latter with a stringcourse at their springline. Above them in each facet is a gently arched two-over-two double-hung sash window, with similar sills and lintels. The third story has the same sort of rectangular casement windows as the main block.

==== Garage wing ====
Extending from the south block's east facade is a garage wing. It is one and a half stories, topped by a cross-gabled hipped roof pierced by a single gabled dormer window on the east. The facade is stone below a water table on the first story and stucco above it.

Its north facade has five gently arched garage bays, all set with wooden doors topped by square-paned transoms and flanked by ornate metal lanterns. A stone apron is set in the pavement in front of the doors.

On the east facade a single four-paned casement window with sandstone lintel is set in the center of the first story. A sandstone stringcourse runs around the building just below the exposed rafters of the broad overhanging eaves; the central gable of the north facade is set with two narrow arched one-over-one double-hung sash topped by sandstone lintels. The east dormer has a similar window.

=== Carriage house ===
The carriage house is a one-and-a-half-story timber frame structure on a stone foundation. It is sided in shingles and topped by a similarly shingled gambrel roof, cross-gambreled at the eastern end. The western section, where the horses and carriages were kept, has one large garage bay with a projecting shed roof. On the north facade, a stone chimney with a narrow six-over-six double-hung sash window in the base separates it from the cross-gambreled main block.

Next to the chimney on the main block is the main entrance, a paneled wooden door with a gambrel hood supported by brackets. To its east are three small nine-pane square casement windows set just below the molded cornice that separates the first story from the roof. West of the main entrance is a single nine-over-nine double-hung sash near the corner with plain wooden surround.

Two more nine-over-nine double-hung sash are located near the corners of the first story's west facade. The west side has a centrally located secondary entrance. Next to it on the north are three more of the nine-pane casement windows.

On the upper level, both of the front gambrels have two more nine-over-nine sash windows. A Palladian window is set in the center of the west apex. The eastern side has a former entrance for loading hay on the south, with two more nine-over-nine double-hung sash to its north. In the center of the roof is an octagonal wooden cupola with louvered vents topped by a conical metal roof.

== History ==
The main block of the house was built in 1853 for Henry Belcher, who owned the Garrison and West Point Ferry Company, which operated from nearby Garrison Landing to Highland Falls across the river. Both terminals were within view of the house. Richard Upjohn's Italianate design was his only use of the Italian villa house type in the Hudson Highlands.

In the later years of the century the house became the home of Hamilton Fish II, one of a long line of local political figures with that name. A lawyer and onetime member of the state assembly, eventually becoming that body's Speaker, he became chair of the Putnam County Republican Party and as such wielded considerable influence over state politics. During his time in the house the building's extensions and outbuildings were added. Around 1880, a young Stanford White designed the property's carriage house in the Shingle Style.

In the early 1980s the mansion was purchased by Patty Hearst and her former bodyguard and husband, Bernard Shaw. They lived there with their children through Shaw's death in 2013. At that time they had just completed an extensive restoration and renovation of the house which changed its exterior appearance.

== See also ==
- National Register of Historic Places listings in Putnam County, New York
