= Mandeville House =

Historic house in New York, United States

- U.S. National Register of Historic Places
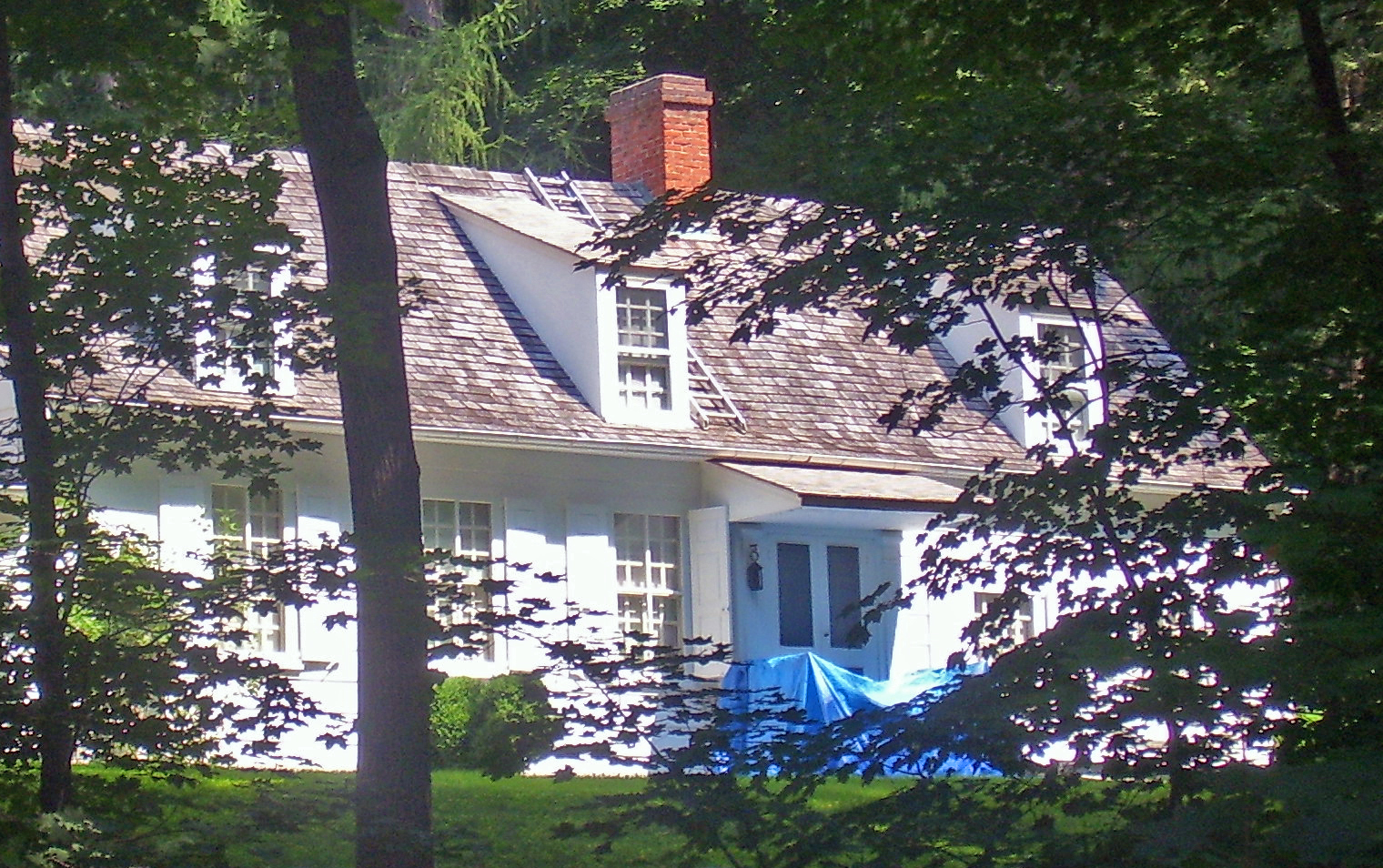
- Partial view of south (front) elevation, 2008
- Location: Garrison, NY
- Nearest city: Peekskill
- Coordinates: 41°22′36″N 73°56′42″W
- Area: 4.8 acres (1.9 ha)
- Built: 1735
- Architect: Richard Upjohn (mid-19th century renovations)
- Architectural style: Colonial Revival
- MPS: Hudson Highlands MRA
- NRHP reference No.: 82001251
- Added to NRHP: November 23, 1982

The Mandeville House is located on Lower Station Road (Putnam County Route 12) in Garrison, New York, United States, just west of its intersection with NY 9D and 403. It is the oldest extant house in that community, dating to 1735.

During the Revolutionary War, General Israel Putnam, after whom the county is named, was headquartered there for a while. A later occupant, architect Richard Upjohn, lived there for the last 25 years of his life. He expanded the house and redid its exterior in the Gothic Revival style that characterized much of his own work; most of these were removed in the 1920s by a later owner in order to restore the house to something close to its original appearance. In 1982 it was listed on the National Register of Historic Places.

In the early 2000s it has been the subject of a dispute between the foundation which owns it and local history enthusiasts. The latter claim the head of the foundation is improperly using it as a residence and has not fully complied with Internal Revenue Service requirements that the house be open to the public as a museum. The head of the foundation denies any impropriety.

== Building ==
The house is situated on a wooded lot of almost 5 acres (2.0 ha), just across from the similarly pre-Revolutionary buildings and structures of the Garrison Grist Mill Historic District on Highlands Golf Club and uphill from the Wilson House and the train station. It is an eight-bay, one-story structure with three shed-roofed dormer windows on and two chimneys piercing its gabled, shingled roof.

Its main facade has six bays with the main entrance in the third from the east. It is surrounded with a shed hood, fluted pilasters and a stoop with two Dutch-style benches. There are several wings, including a cross-gabled rear and a garage connected to the main house by breezeway.

The interior has some original paneling and trim, particularly around the fireplaces in the main block. Most of the other trim is from the Colonial Revival restoration in the 1920s.

== History ==
In 1697 William III granted the property that included the future Mandeville House to Adolphe Philipse, whose family owned much of today's Putnam County. He is the first European owner of record. Thirty-eight years later, in 1735, Jacob Mandeville, leased 400 acres (160 ha) in the area of present-day Garrison, married and likely built the first part of the house. At that time it consisted of the present-day dining room and the space above. A kitchen wing was added later, and more upstairs rooms came into being sometime before the Revolution.

Around that time, the lands were inherited by Beverley Robinson, warden of the nearby St. Philip's Church in the Highlands, who had married into the Philipse family. His holdings were confiscated by the state of New York when he began working with the British Army due to his Loyalist sympathies during the war. In 1779, Israel Putnam used it as his headquarters. On two occasions that year, George Washington visited Putnam there and spent the night.

In 1785, the state sold the lands with the house to Joshua Nelson, a son-in-law of Mandeville's. His family sold it to a Mrs. Brown in the 1840s. She, in turn, sold it to Richard Upjohn in 1852.

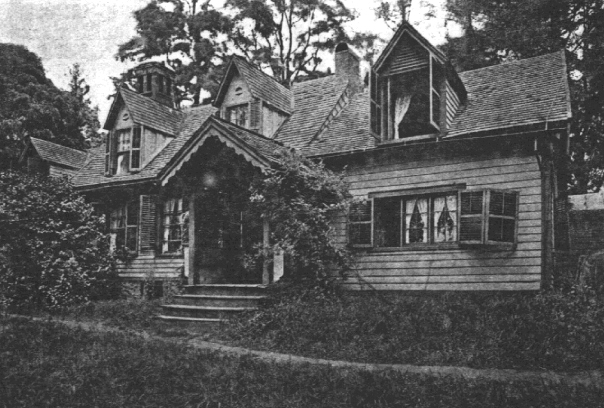
Gothic exterior treatment added by Upjohn, photographed ca. 1912

At that time the middle-aged architect had established himself and was looking to settle down in the country after retiring from practice in New York City. He had designed the new St. Philip's church nearby, and was working on residential commissions in the area like Dick's Castle, The Grove and Rock Lawn. He made many renovations to the Mandeville House, such as the library and north wings. He added a Swiss-Gothic facade to the front, reflecting the tastes of the era.

Upjohn lived in the house until his death in 1878. His descendants added some more rooms and remained until they sold the house to a Col. Julian Benjamin, a descendant of Peter Stuyvesant, in 1922. He and his wife, Nancy Allan, took down Upjohn's Gothic exterior treatment and restored it in the Colonial Revival style, using Dutch stylings wherever possible to reflect Mandeville's perceived tastes, such as the shed dormers and stoop. They also added the garage wing and shed dormers on the north side.

Allan inherited the property when her husband died in 1953, and passed it along in short order to her daughter, Margaret Allan Gething. When she died 20 years later, her will provided for the establishment of a trust to maintain the house along with another historic house she owned in San Antonio as museums.

Robert Perry, a Texas lawyer and friend of the family, named the trust the Perry-Gething Foundation. Local preservationists have filed complaints against Perry with the state and the Internal Revenue Service, angry that he keeps the house closed most of the year and resides in it himself for several weeks in the spring and fall. Perry responds that when he is present, the house is open by appointment. The tax code, he says, requires only that the foundation maintain the property and says nothing about it making the museum open to the public.

== See also ==
- List of Washington's Headquarters during the Revolutionary War
- National Register of Historic Places listings in Putnam County, New York

== External list ==
- Media related to Mandeville House at Wikimedia Commons
