= Garrison Grist Mill Historic District =

Historic district in New York, United States

- U.S. National Register of Historic Places
- U.S. Historic district
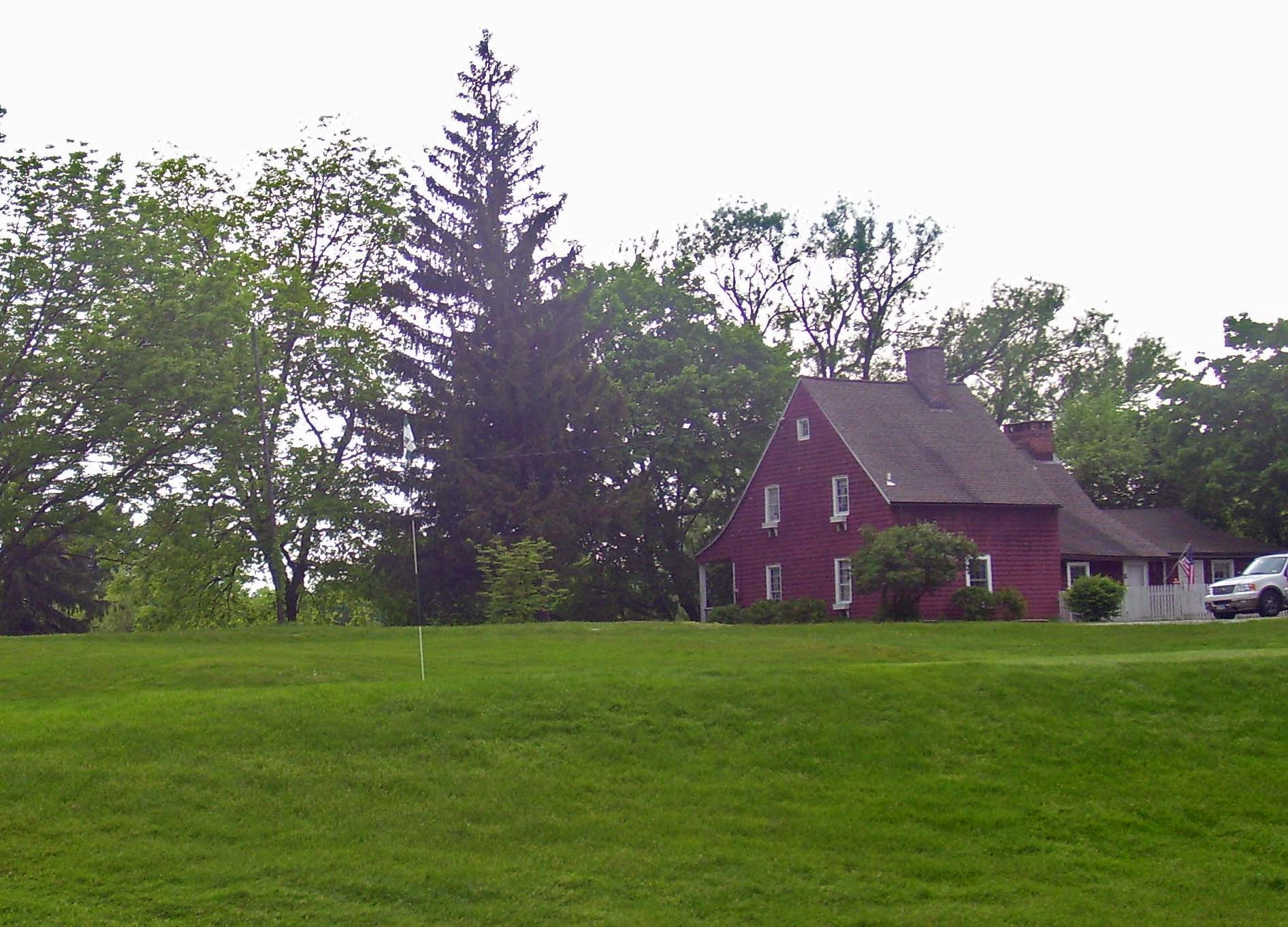
- Frame cottage visible from NY 9D, with green in foreground, 2008

- Location within New York Location within the United States
- Location: Garrison, NY
- Nearest city: Peekskill
- Coordinates: 41°22′31″N 73°56′41″W
- Area: 13.4 acres (5.4 ha)
- Built: Colonial era
- Architectural style: Dutch Colonial
- NRHP reference No.: 93001434
- Added to NRHP: December 23, 1993

The Garrison Grist Mill Historic District is a 13.4-acre (5.4 ha) parcel of Highlands Country Club located at the southwest corner of the intersection of NY 9D and Lower Station Road (Putnam County Route 12) in Garrison, New York, United States. It contains three buildings, including the titular gristmill (believed to be one of the oldest in the county, and a dam, all dating to the colonial era or the early years of American independence. They are interspersed within the club's golf course, and actually come under the ownership of the Open Space Institute.

Little is known about who built the structures, and when. Their architecture suggests they are among the oldest buildings in Garrison, some of the few extant examples of vernacular architecture in the hamlet. They were added to the National Register of Historic Places (NRHP) as a historic district in 1992.

== Geography and properties ==
The district is bounded on the east by Route 9D, the north by Lower Station Road, the south by Arden Brook and the west by a dirt path that goes from Lower Station to the brook. Other NRHP-listed properties are nearby: The Birches is across 9D, the Mandeville House across Lower Station and Wilson House a short distance to the west down Lower Station, which leads to the train station and the neighboring Garrison Landing Historic District. Castle Rock is visible to the east atop a nearby mountain. The three buildings and one structure, all contributing resources, are located between the fairways of the golf course.

The most noticeable building in the district is the red frame one-and-half-story farmhouse visible from the nearby intersection. It sits on a slight slope to the nearby Hudson River. Its shingle siding was applied later over painted weatherboard. The main block retains more of its original furnishing and layout than the kitchen wing.

Five hundred feet (150 m) south of the farmhouse is a New World Dutch barn, in the traditional wood-frame style with large wagon doors at each end. It is sided in weathered clapboard. To its northwest sits the millpond, and at the other end is the gristmill, where the landscape begins to descend more steeply to the river. It is a 2 1/2-story building that has been converted to an apartment in part. In addition to that there have been other renovations and deterioration to the property over the years.

The last property in the district is the dam. It is made of locally quarried stone and begins 50 feet (15 m) east of the mill, following a natural fall line at the northwest corner of the district.

== History ==
There is little, if any, mention of the mill, barn or farmhouse in early histories or maps of the Garrison area. Although the architectural styles and building materials strongly suggest a mid- to late 18th century construction date, similar buildings are known to have been erected in the Hudson Valley as late as 1820. The framing system of the farmhouse is more commonly found in the lower valley, in areas closer to New York City that were settled earlier, and more study is needed, especially given the high integrity of the structure.

The earliest landowner known to have developed property in the area was Jacob Mandeville, a New York City businessman who leased 400 acres (160 ha) in the area from Beverley Robinson in 1735 and built his still-extant home just outside the district. It is possible that he could have built the farm and mill before the Revolution, but there is no record that would prove this.

His landlord was a Virginian who had married into the Philipse family, whose vast landholdings extended from the Garrison area almost to what is today known as Spuyten Duyvil in the Bronx, was like his in-laws a Loyalist during the Revolution who actively fought for the crown. The Robinson and Philipse lands were confiscated during the war, and after the colonists' victory he left for England. Mandeville was allowed to live out his life on the (now subdivided) property he had leased, and after his death in 1784 it was purchased by his son-in-law, Joshua Nelson.

Nelson further subdivided the property, and in 1792 sold the 70-acre (28 ha) parcel including the district. From him it passed through several other owners, who appear to have continued to farm and mill. The last of these, Thomas Arden and his family, acquired the property in 1820 and continued to own it for the rest of the century. In 1899, the Ardenia Corporation, a local conservation organization, took title and, shortly afterward, leased it to the newly formed Highlands Country Club for use as part of its golf course.

As Garrison became a popular area to build large riverside estates, the properties remained untouched but were also largely ignored by any historians of the area. In 1934, however, Thomas Hotchkiss, a Peekskill man working for the Historic American Buildings Survey, visited what he described as the "Galloway Farmhouse", then in use as a greenskeeper's lodge, and wrote a brief report as well as taking photographs and making sketches. Hotchkiss noted the unique historicity of a group of buildings that were so old having survived the later surge of local development, and documented some features of the buildings, particularly the mill wheel's exterior gearing, that have since been lost.

In 1986 it came under the control of the Open Space Institute (OSI), as part of a 71-acre (29 ha) parcel that became Arden Point State Park. OSI renovated the mill, and has allowed the club to continue its use as a golf course, since that preserves the original agricultural character of the surrounding land.
