= The Birches (Garrison, New York) =

Historic house in New York, United States

- U.S. National Register of Historic Places
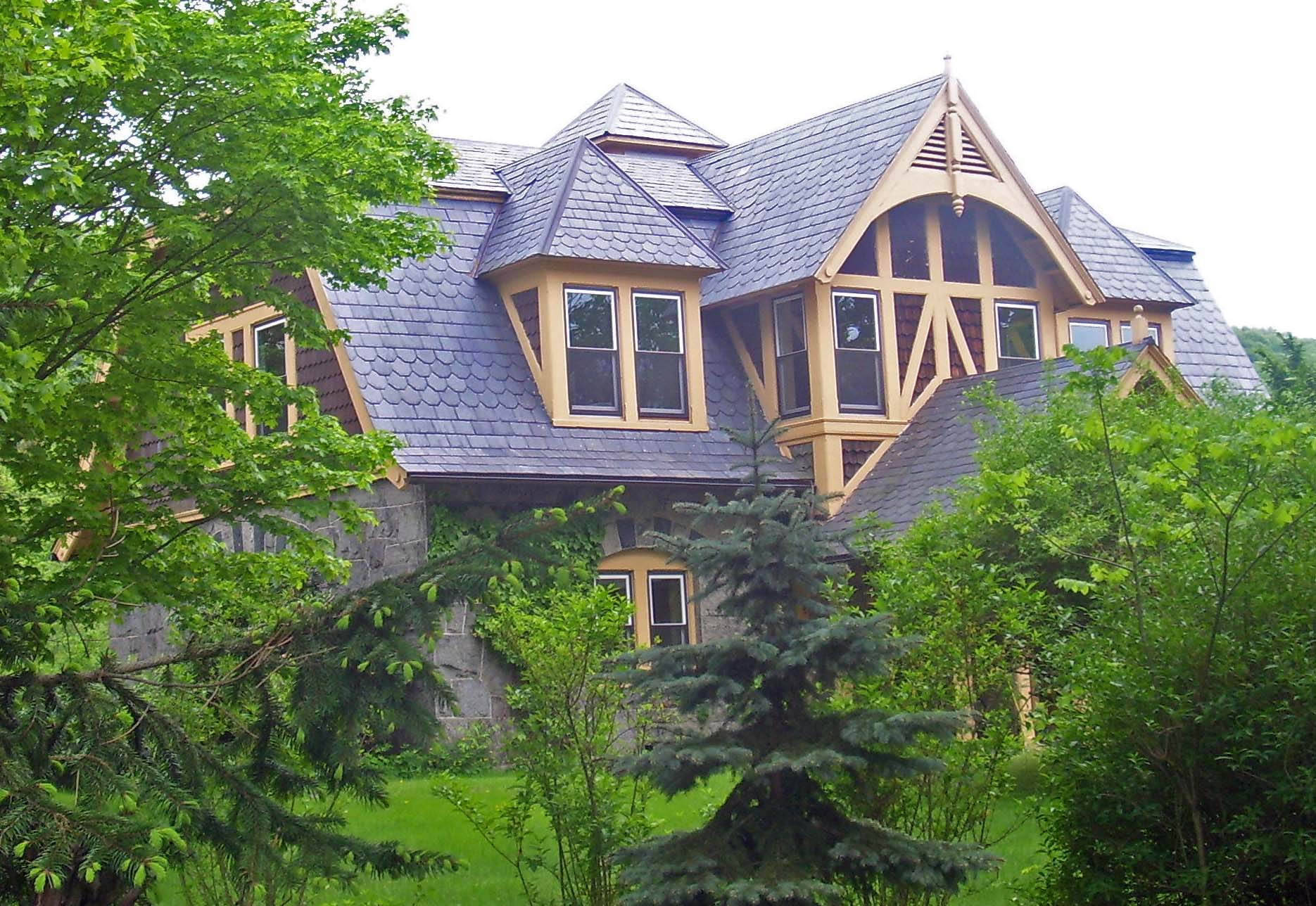
- Front view in 2008
- Location: Cat Rock Rd., hamlet of Garrison, town of Philipstown, NY
- Nearest city: Peekskill
- Coordinates: 41°22′32″N 73°56′36″W
- Area: 1 acre (0.40 ha)
- Built: 1882
- Architect: Ralph Adams Cram
- Architectural style: Gothic Revival
- MPS: Hudson Highlands MRA
- NRHP reference No.: 82001259
- Added to NRHP: November 23, 1982

The Birches is a house at the southeast corner of the junction of NY 9D and 403 in the hamlet of Garrison, New York, United States. It was built for William H. Osborn, as part of his nearby Wing & Wing estate, by architect Ralph Adams Cram in the Gothic Revival architectural style. Osborn was a 19th-century railroad tycoon, who became one of the most prominent railroad leaders in the United States. In addition to Wing and Wing and the Birches, Osborn famously constructed Castle Rock, his great summer estate overlooking the Hudson River.

In 1982 it was added to the National Register of Historic Places. It is just across Route 9D from the Garrison Grist Mill Historic District.

== Building ==
The first story is built of dressed, randomly coursed stone. It gives way to frame and a gambrel roof on the upper stories. A projecting, center-shingled pavilion on the west facade is trimmed in half-timber, coming to a louvered gable peak with its rafters intentionally exposed as decoration. A similarly decorated porch, with open gable, extends from the pavilion. The south profile has a one-story projecting bay supporting a balcony. The windows and doors on the first story have arched openings, echoed by a split rounded transom over the double-doored main entrance.

There is one outbuilding on the property: a one-story frame carriage house, later a garage, to the east. Two apartments have since been added to it.

== History ==
The Birches was designed in 1882 for William H. Osborn, owner of the nearby Wing & Wing estate. Within the Osborn family, it became known as the Honeymoon House, since both William Church and Fairfield Osborn lived there after their weddings while waiting for their own nearby homes to be completed. When not used by them, it was occasionally home to the family's servants.

Due to this near-constant use, Osborn and his descendants never followed through on their plans to donate it to the Town of Philipstown (the town in which the hamlet of Garrison is located) for use as a public library (one was eventually built just across Route 403). So, when the family finally sold it in 1976, it remained in use as a house. The house was extensively renovated by new owners during the period from 2009 - 2012; during the renovation, a number of period details were preserved.

== Aesthetics ==
Cram's design, one of the earlier ones in his career, interpreted the Picturesque Gothic Revival cottages that Calvert Vaux and Frederick Clarke Withers, following the patterns of their mentor, Andrew Jackson Downing, had built all over the Hudson Valley and, later, the country, three decades earlier, before the Civil War. The result was a late example of the Victorian Gothic style, distinct for a home in the area.

The stone coursework on the lower story links the house with other former Osborn properties in Garrison. Its style links it to the nearby Castle Rock, which can be seen over the house when it is viewed from the northwest, in the center of the intersection.
