= Wilson House (Garrison, New York) =

Historic house in New York, United States

- U.S. National Register of Historic Places
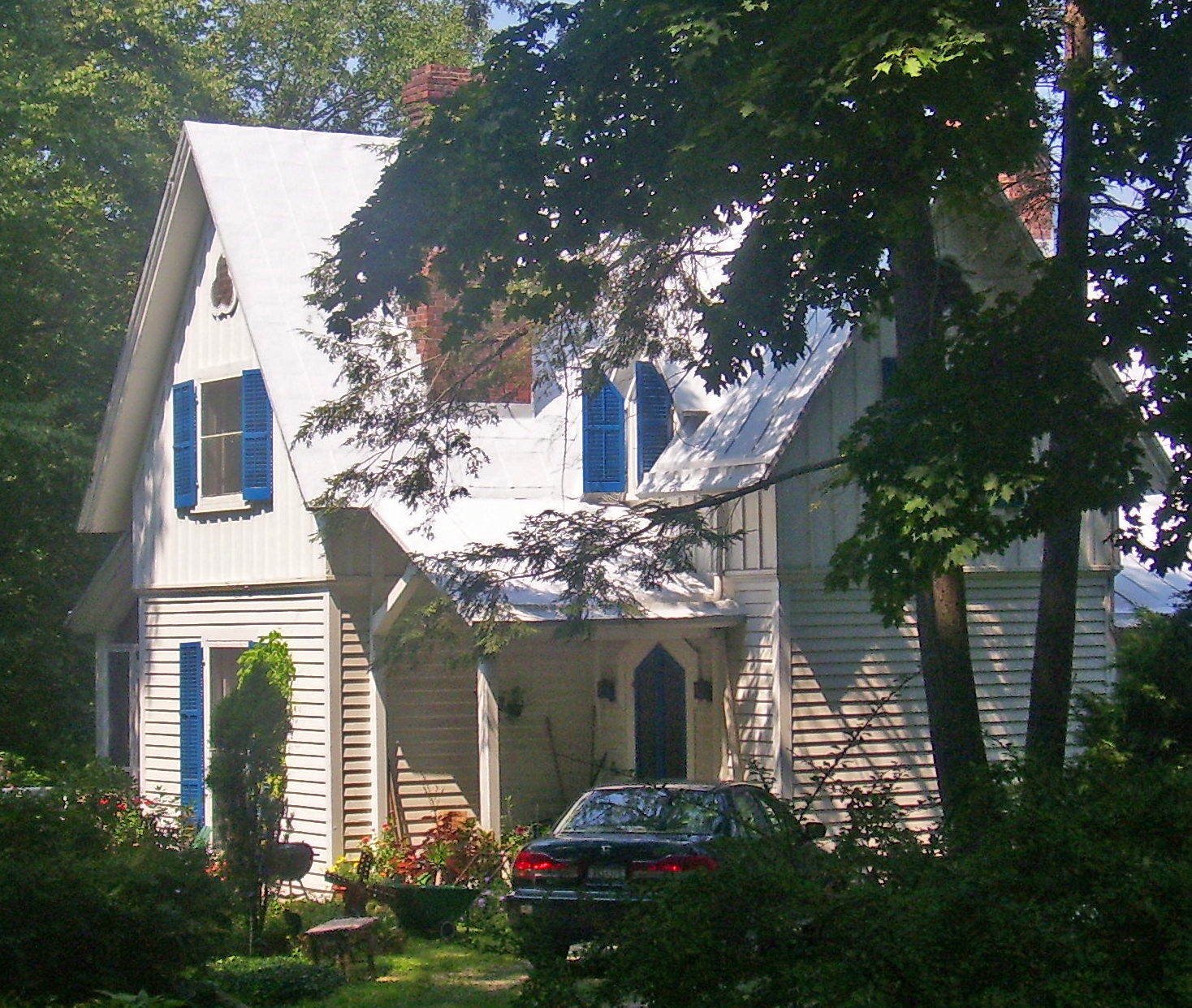
- East elevation and south profile, 2008
- Location: Garrison, NY
- Coordinates: 41°22′38″N 73°56′49″W
- Built: ca. 1865
- Architect: George E. Harney
- Architectural style: Carpenter Gothic
- MPS: Hudson Highlands MRA
- NRHP reference No.: 82001257
- Added to NRHP: November 23, 1982

The Wilson House in Garrison, New York, United States is located at a bend in Lower Station Road (Putnam County Route 12) just uphill from Garrison Landing and the train station at the Hudson River, and downhill from Mandeville House and the Garrison Grist Mill Historic District.

It is a wooden cottage in the Carpenter Gothic architectural style, one-and-a-half stories high, sided in a combination of clapboard and board-and-batten. It sits on a stone foundation with a steeply-pitched cross-gabled seamed metal roof. The gable ends have a louvered trefoil vent, and the south (front) elevation has a gabled dormer window with a pointed-arch window, a treatment echoed by the paneled main entrance. The south and west sides have shed-roofed porches with chamfered piers.

This level of Gothic detailing is considered the finest Gothic in the Hudson Highlands. In 1982 it was added to the National Register of Historic Places as part of the Hudson Highlands Multiple Resource Area.

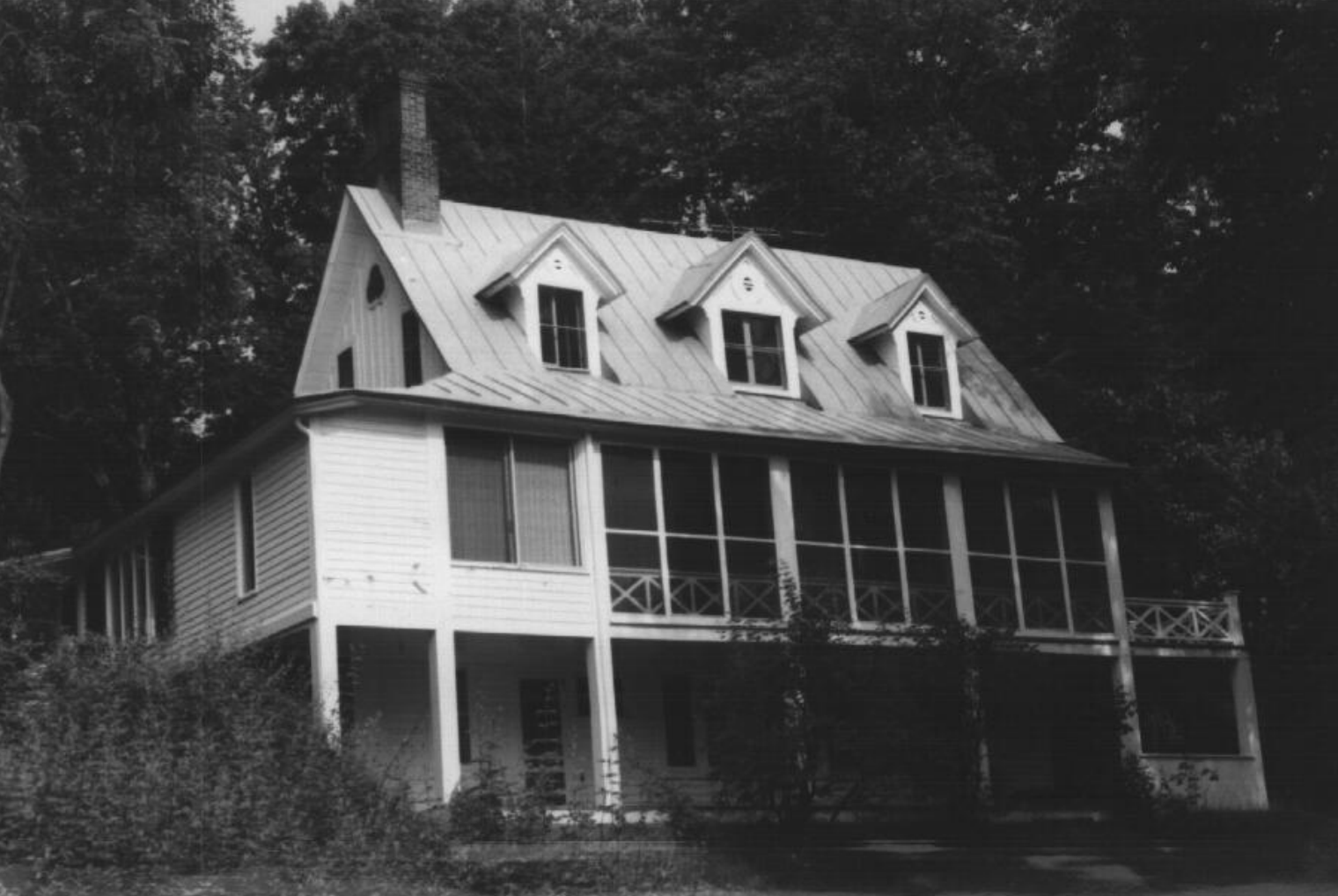
Modified rear elevation, 1982
