= Special routes of U.S. Route 202 =

Special routes of U.S. Route 202

Highway system
- United States Numbered Highway System; List; Special; Divided

There are several special routes of U.S. Route 202 that exist. The list is organized by state south-to-north, then west-to-east.

== Pennsylvania ==
=== Norristown truck route ===
U.S. Route 202 Truck
- Location: Norristown, Pennsylvania
- Length: 0.36 mi (580 m)

U.S. Route 202 Truck is a northbound truck route of US 202 in Norristown, Pennsylvania that follows Marshall Street east between two-way Markley Street, which carries southbound US 202, and one-way Dekalb Street, which carries northbound US 202. The route directs trucks along northbound Markley Street to use Marshall Street to access northbound US 202, as trucks are prohibited on Markley Street north of Marshall Street.

Major intersections

The entire route is in Norristown, Montgomery County.

mi	km	Destinations	Notes
0.00	0.00	US 202 south (Markley Street) / Marshall Street	Southern terminus
0.36	0.58	US 202 north (Dekalb Street) / Marshall Street	Northern terminus
1.000 mi = 1.609 km; 1.000 km = 0.621 mi

=== North Wales alternate truck route ===
U.S. Route 202 Alternate Truck
- Location: Montgomery County, Pennsylvania
- Length: 5.5 mi (8.9 km)
- Existed: 2013–present

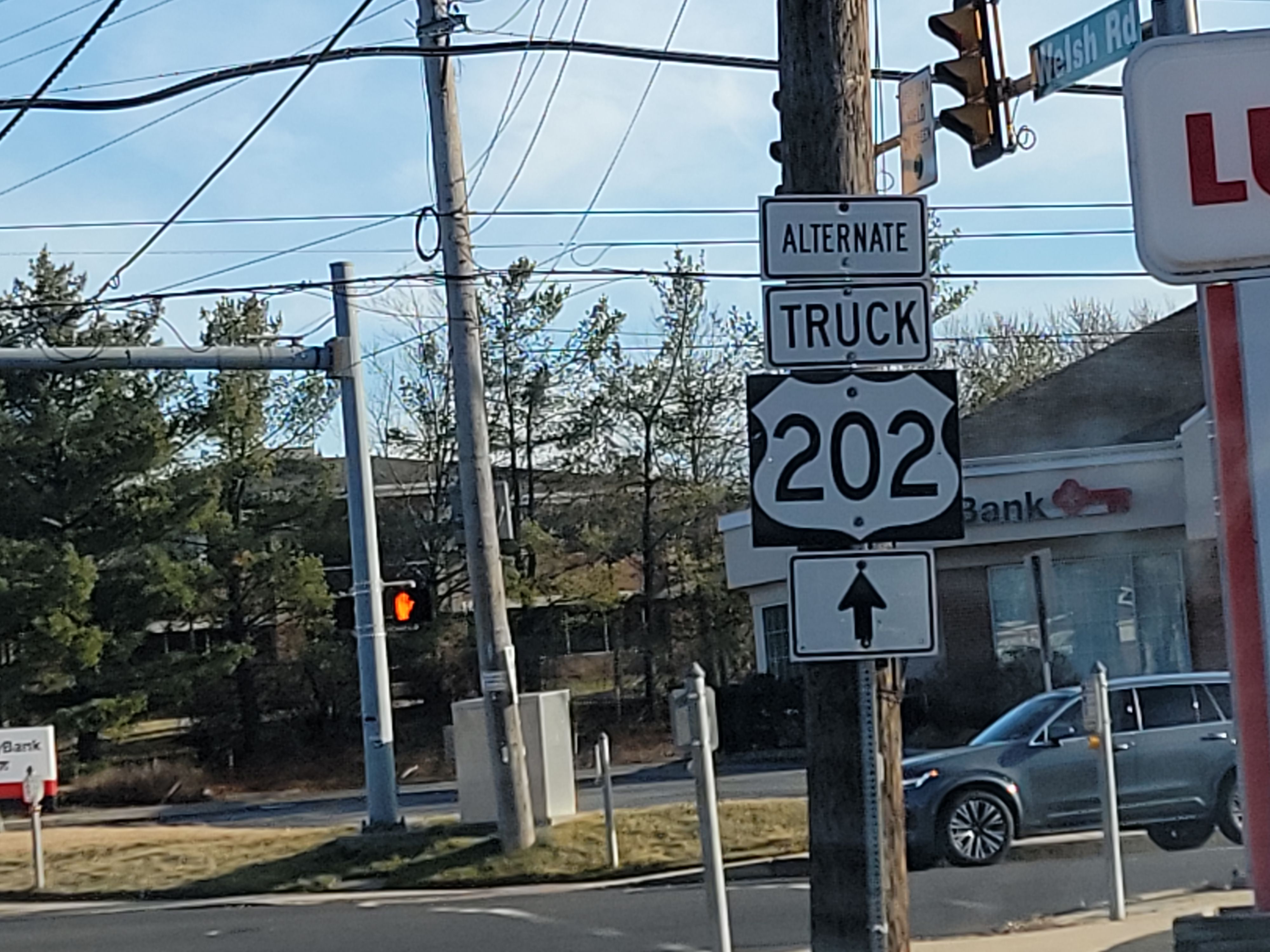
US 202 Alternate Truck along PA 63 near Lansdale.

U.S. Route 202 Alternate Truck is a truck route of US 202 bypassing a weight-restricted bridge over the Wissahickon Creek in Lower Gwynedd Township, Pennsylvania, on which trucks over 30 tons and combination loads over 40 tons are prohibited. The route follows Morris Road, North Wales Road (Walnut Street in North Wales), and PA 63 through North Wales. It was formed in 2013.

In February 2020, construction began along mainline US 202 from Morris Road in Whitpain Township to Swedesford Road in Lower Gwynedd Township. This project will effect the bridge that carries US 202 over the Wissahickon Creek, which, if built to and deemed at least "fair condition" by PennDOT, may see US 202 Alternate Truck removed from PennDOT.

Major intersections

The entire route is in Montgomery County.

Location	mi	km	Destinations	Notes
Whitpain Township	0.00	0.00	US 202 (Dekalb Pike) / Morris Road	Southern terminus
Lansdale	4.34	6.98	PA 63 west (East Main Street) / North Wales Road	Southern end of concurrency with PA 63
Upper Gwynedd–Montgomery township line	5.31	8.55	US 202 Bus. (Dekalb Pike) to US 202 south – Montgomeryville, Norristown	
Upper Gwynedd–Montgomery township line	5.50	8.85	US 202 – Doylestown, Norristown PA 63 east (Welsh Road) – Willow Grove	Northern terminus; northern end of concurrency with PA 63
1.000 mi = 1.609 km; 1.000 km = 0.621 mi: Concurrency terminus

=== Montgomeryville–Doylestown business route ===
U.S. Route 202 Business
- Location: Montgomeryville-Doylestown, Pennsylvania
- Length: 9.118 mi (14.674 km)
- Existed: 2015–present

U.S. Route 202 Business (US 202 Bus.) is a business route that follows the former alignment of US 202 between Montgomeryville and Doylestown in Pennsylvania that was bypassed by the US 202 parkway in 2012. The route heads northeast from US 202 in Upper Gwynedd Township along five-lane Dekalb Pike through residential and commercial areas. In Montgomeryville, the route turns north to run concurrent with PA 309 on five-lane Bethlehem Pike past several businesses. US 202 Bus. splits from PA 309 by turning northeast onto two-lane Doylestown Road. The route crosses into Bucks County and becomes Butler Avenue, passing through Chalfont and New Britain and curving east. West of Doylestown, the business route ends at an interchange with PA 611 in Doylestown Township. Following the completion of the US 202 parkway in 2012, several businesses along the former alignment saw declines in customers. In 2014, several businesses along the former alignment pushed for the state to designate the road as US 202 Bus. in order to help businesses. The American Association of State Highway and Transportation Officials Special Committee on U.S. Route Numbering approved the US 202 Bus. designation on May 13, 2015.

== New York ==
=== Cortlandt alternate route ===
U.S. Route 202 Alternate
- Location: Putnam County, Westchester County

U.S. Route 202 Alternate (concurrent with U.S. Route 6 Alternate for its entire length) is a 10.5-mile (16.9 km) bypass of Bear Mountain Bridge Road, the winding segment of US 6 and US 202 between NY 9D and US 9 north of Peekskill.

== See also ==
- List of special routes of the United States Numbered Highway System
