= Henry Fairfield Osborn =

American geologist and eugenicist (1857–1935)

Henry Fairfield Osborn ForMemRS
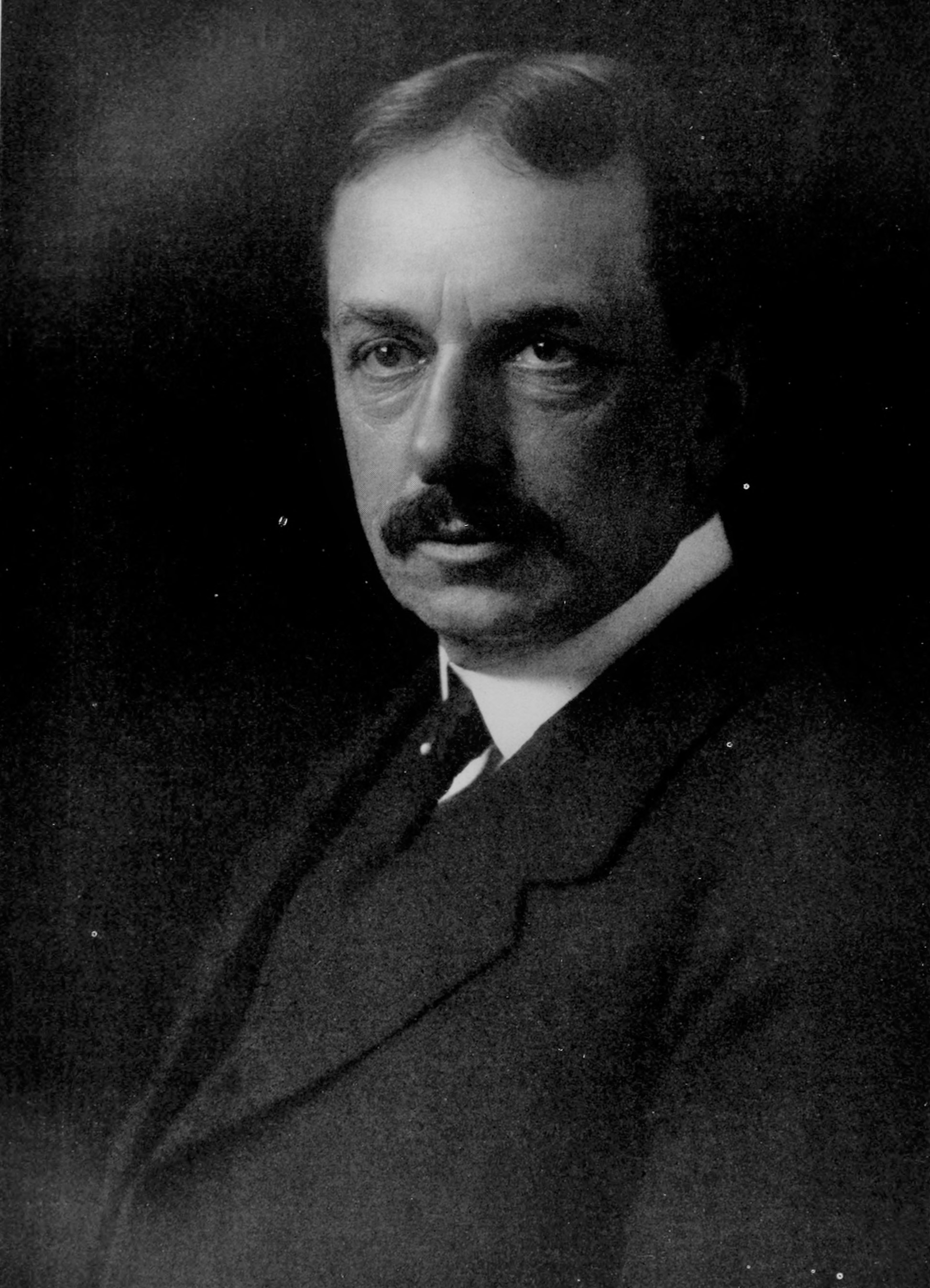
- Born: August 8, 1857; Fairfield, Connecticut, U.S.
- Died: November 6, 1935 (aged 78); Garrison, New York, U.S.
- Education: Princeton University (BA, PhD)
- Spouse: Lucretia Thatcher Perry (m. 1881; died 1930)
- Children: 5
- Awards: Hayden Memorial Geological Award (1914); Cullum Geographical Medal (1919); Wollaston Medal (1926); Daniel Giraud Elliot Medal (1929)
- Scientific career
- Fields: Geology; Paleontology
- Workplaces: American Museum of Natural History
- Doctoral students: William King Gregory
- Author abbrev. (zoology): Osborn

Signature
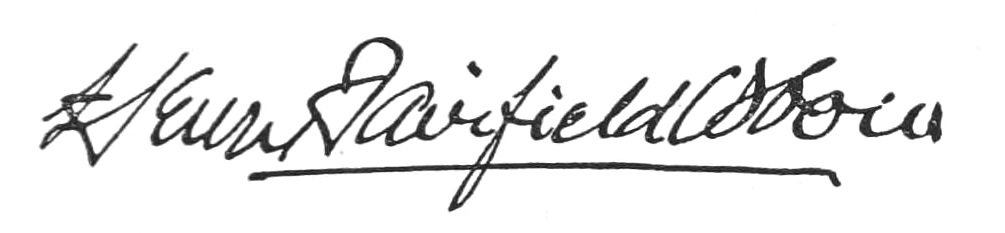

Henry Fairfield Osborn, Sr. FRS (August 8, 1857 – November 6, 1935) was an American paleontologist, geologist and eugenics advocate. He was professor of anatomy at Columbia University, president of the American Museum of Natural History for 25 years and a cofounder of the American Eugenics Society.

Among his significant contributions include naming the dinosaurs Tyrannosaurus and Velociraptor, his widely used system of names for dental cusps and other features of mammalian teeth, as well as his research on fossil proboscideans (elephants and their extinct relatives).

Osborn was one of the most well known scientists in the United States during his own lifetime, "second only to Albert Einstein", and was a prominent public advocate for the existence of evolution. Active during the eclipse of Darwinism, Osborn was a prominent opponent of natural selection as a mechanism of evolution, favouring the now discredited orthogenesis theory of which he was one of the most prominent advocates.

In addition to being an advocate of eugenics, he was a Nordicist, viewing the white race as superior, and supported immigration controls. Osborn's political connections allowed him to gain significant funding for the American Museum of Natural History, using this to redesign and expand the museums exhibits, which he used to reflect his own views on "racialism, eugenics, and immigration".

== Early life and education ==
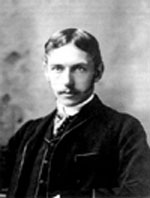
Osborn in 1890

=== Family ===
Henry Fairfield Osborn was born in Fairfield, Connecticut on August 8, 1857, in a family of distinction. He was the eldest son of shipping magnate and railroad tycoon William Henry Osborn and Virginia Reed (née Sturges) Osborn.

His maternal grandparents were Jonathan Sturges, a prominent New York businessman and arts patron who was a direct descendant of Jonathan Sturges, a U.S. Representative from Connecticut, and Mary Pemberton Cady, a direct descendant of prominent educator Ebenezer Pemberton. His maternal aunt, Amelia Sturges, was the first wife of J. P. Morgan, but died of tuberculosis soon after their wedding.

His younger brother was William Church Osborn, who served as president of the Metropolitan Museum of Art, and married philanthropist and social reformer Alice Clinton Hoadley Dodge, a daughter of William E. Dodge Jr.

=== Education ===
From 1873 to 1877, Osborn studied at Princeton University, obtaining a B.A. in geology and archaeology, where he was mentored by paleontologist Edward Drinker Cope. Two years later, Osborn took a special course of study in anatomy in the College of Physicians and Surgeons and Bellevue Medical School of New York under Dr. William H. Welch, and subsequently studied embryology and comparative anatomy under Thomas Huxley at London, as well as Francis Maitland Balfour at Cambridge University, England.

In 1880, Osborn obtained a doctorate in paleontology from Princeton, becoming a lecturer in biology and professor of comparative anatomy from the same university between 1883 and 1890.

== Career ==
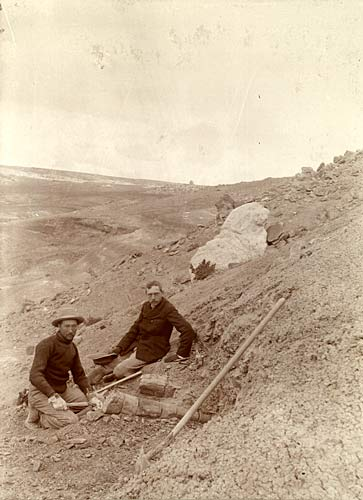
Osborn (r.) and Barnum Brown at Como-Bluff during the American Museum of Natural History expedition of 1897 with limb bone of Diplodocus specimen AMNH 223

In 1891, Osborn was hired by Columbia University as a professor of zoology; simultaneously, he accepted a position at the American Museum of Natural History, New York, where he served as the curator of a newly formed Department of Vertebrate Paleontology.

=== Fossil hunting ===
As a curator, he assembled a remarkable team of fossil hunters and preparators, including William King Gregory, Roy Chapman Andrews, Barnum Brown, and Charles R. Knight. Long a member of the US Geological Survey, Osborn became its senior vertebrate paleontologist in 1924. He led many fossil-hunting expeditions into the American Southwest, starting with his first to Colorado and Wyoming in 1877. Osborn conducted research on Tyrannosaurus brains by cutting open fossilized braincases with a diamond saw. (Modern researchers use computed tomography scans and 3D reconstruction software to visualize the interior of dinosaur endocrania without damaging valuable specimens.)

On November 23, 1897, he was elected member of the Boone and Crockett Club, a wildlife conservation organization founded by Theodore Roosevelt and George Bird Grinnell. Thanks to his considerable family wealth and personal connections, he succeeded Morris K. Jesup as the president of the AMNH's Board of Trustees in 1908, serving until 1933, during which time he accumulated one of the finest fossil collections in the world.

Additionally, Osborn served as president of the New York Zoological Society from 1909 to 1925.

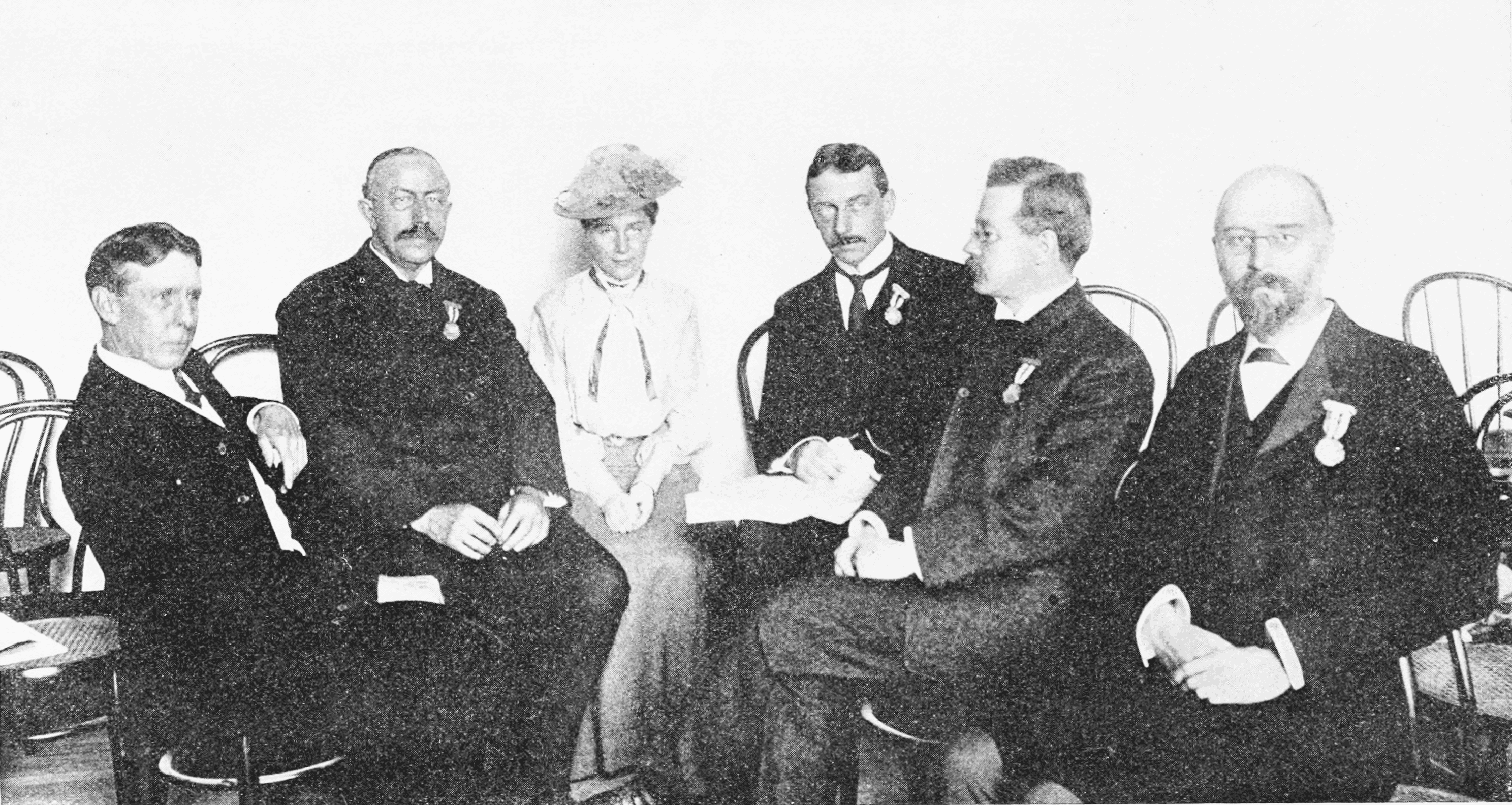
Osborn (third from the right) with other officers of the paleontology section of the St Louis Congress

He was elected as a member to the American Philosophical Society in 1886. He accumulated a number of prizes for his work in paleontology. In 1901, Osborn was elected a Fellow of the American Academy of Arts and Sciences. He described and named Ornitholestes in 1903, Tyrannosaurus rex and Albertosaurus in 1905, Pentaceratops in 1923, and Velociraptor in 1924.

In 1929 Osborn was awarded the Daniel Giraud Elliot Medal from the National Academy of Sciences.

=== American Museum of Natural History ===
His legacy at the American Museum has proved more enduring than his scientific reputation. Edward J. Larson described Osborn as "a first-rate science administrator and a third-rate scientist." Indeed, Osborn's greatest contributions to science ultimately lay in his efforts to popularize it through visual means. At his urging, staff members at the American Museum of Natural History invested new energy in display, and the museum became one of the pre-eminent sites for exhibition in the early twentieth century as a result. The murals, habitat dioramas, and dinosaur mounts executed during his tenure at the museum attracted millions of visitors, and inspired other museums to imitate his innovations. But his decision to invest heavily in exhibition also alienated certain members of the scientific community and angered curators hoping to spend more time on their own research. Additionally, his efforts to imbue the museum's exhibits and educational programs with his own racist and eugenist beliefs disturbed many of his contemporaries and have marred his legacy.

=== Research ===
Osborn was a supporter of the "tritubercular theory" of the evolution of mammalian teeth, originally proposed by Edward Drinker Cope based on fossil tooth morphology, and a rival to the "concrescence theory" proposed by German dentist and physician Carl Röse based on analysis of the development of modern mammal teeth. The tritubercular theory held that the multicusped molar teeth of mammals evolved from single cusped teeth like those found in reptiles, and that a three-cusped (tritubercular) pattern is the ancestral organisation of mammalian molars. The tritubercular theory was criticised by Röse and other contemporary scholars for being incogruent with knowledge obtained from analysis of modern tooth development, and was corrected to fix some issues by later scholars. Osborn's system of naming for the cusps and other elements of mammalian teeth has been widely adopted by later scholars.

In 1922, Osborn named Hesperopithecus (also known as "Nebraska Man"), a supposed genus of North American ape from Nebraska, based on an isolated tooth. It later turned out to be a junior synonym of Prosthennops, a peccary (a group closely related to and resembling pigs), to Osborn's considerable embarrassment.

Osborn's research on proboscideans, the group containing elephants and their extinct relatives has been described as a "modern stimulus and driving force for research" on the group. In particular, his posthumous monograph on the group, published in two volumes in 1936 and 1942, has been called a "landmark of evolution and natural history of the Proboscidea". While the monograph has been regarded as being a monumental and significant work, later researchers have criticised Osborn for overestimating the number of proboscidean species. Advait M. Jukar has described Osborn as a "controversial figure in proboscidean paleontology—particularly for his taxonomic decisions, classification schemes, and ideas of evolutionary mechanisms" but that "his contribution to the study of fossil proboscideans cannot be overlooked", citing his ultimately correct 1900 hypothesis that the group originated in Africa. His work on North American mammoth taxonomy has been described as introducing considerable taxonomic confusion for arbitrarily naming a neotype specimen for the Columbian mammoth (Mammuthus columbi) without adequate justification, as well as introducing several mammoth species that are now regarded as synonymous with the Columbian mammoth. Osborn largely failed to take into account the effect of tooth wear on the shape of mammoth teeth, which was a partial cause of the confusion.

Osborn was involved in organising the American Museum of Natural History's "Central Asiatic Expeditions" to Eastern Asia in the 1920s headed by Roy Chapman Andrews, with a major goal being to find proof for the "Out of Asia" theory of mankind's origins that Osborn advocated. Osborn described a number of species based on remains found during the expeditions, such as Andrewsarchus (named after Andrews) as well as several now invalid species of Paraceratherium.

He was a member of the American Association for Anatomy.

=== Public outreach ===
Osborn was one of the most well known scientists in the United States during his own lifetime, "second only to Albert Einstein", and was the author of a number of books aimed at popular audiences. During the 1920s, Osborn became an outspoken public advocate of evolution against religious critics. During the 1925 Scopes Monkey Trial regarding the teaching of human evolution, Osborn wrote a book The Earth Speaks to Bryan responding to the lawyer William Jennings Bryan, a critic of evolution and prosecutor on the case (who Osborn had debated in writing for several years prior to the trial), a compilation of speeches defending evolution and suggesting that evolution and religion were compatible.

== Theories ==
=== Dawn Man Theory ===
Osborn developed his own evolutionary theory of human origins called the "Dawn Man Theory". His theory was founded on the discovery of Piltdown Man (Eoanthropus) which was dated to the Late (Upper) Pliocene. Writing before Piltdown was exposed as a hoax, the Eoanthropus or "Dawn Man" Osborn maintained sprang from a common ancestor with the ape during the Oligocene period which he believed developed entirely separately during the Miocene (16 million years ago). Therefore, Osborn argued that all apes (Simia, following the pre-Darwinian classification of Linnaeus) had evolved entirely parallel to the ancestors of man (Homo). Osborn himself wrote:

We have all borne with the ape and monkey and ape hypothesis long enough are we are glad to welcome this new idea of the aristocracy of man back to a even more remote period than the beginning of the stone age.

While believing in common ancestry between man and ape, Osborn denied that this ancestor was ape-like. The common ancestor between man and ape Osborn always maintained was more human than ape. Writing to Arthur Keith in 1927, he remarked "when our Oligocene ancestor is found it will not be an ape, but it will be surprisingly pro-human". His student William K. Gregory called Osborn's idiosyncratic view on man's origins as a form of "Parallel Evolution", but many creationists misinterpreted Osborn, greatly frustrating him, and believed he was asserting humankind had never evolved from a lower life form.

=== Evolutionary views ===
Osborn was originally a supporter of Edward Drinker Cope's neo-Lamarckism, however he later abandoned this view. Osborn became a proponent of organic selection, also known as the Baldwin effect.

Osborn was a believer in orthogenesis; he coined the term aristogenesis for his theory. His aristogenesis was based on a "physicochemical approach" to evolution. He believed that aristogenes operate as biomechanisms in the geneplasm of the organism. He also held the view that mutations and natural selection play no creative role in evolution and that aristogenesis was the origin of new novelty. Osborn equated this struggle for evolutionary advancement with the striving for spiritual salvation, thereby combining his biological and spiritual viewpoints.

== Eugenics, racialism and immigration ==
Osborn is widely known to have held racist and antisemitic views.^{102} Osborn, who cofounded the American Eugenics Society in 1922, advocated that heredity is superior to influences from the environment. As an extension of this, he accepted that distinct races existed with fixed hereditary traits, and was a Nordicist, regarding, the Nordic or Anglo-Saxon "race" to be highest. Osborn therefore supported eugenics to preserve "good" racial stock. Due to this, he endorsed Madison Grant's The Passing of the Great Race, writing both the second and fourth prefaces of the book, which argued for such views. The book was praised by Adolf Hitler who called the book 'his bible' for it advocated a rigid system of selection through the elimination of those who, according to the writer's opinion, are to be seen as 'weak' or 'unfit'. Osborn also advocated for immigration controls.^{102} Osborn made conflicting statements on race. During the early phases of World War I, Osborn made a speech about the negative effects of cultural and ethnic prejudice on society, with Osborn stating: "History must be taught, ... not to perpetuate hate and prejudice, but to eliminate these pernicious influences from our national life, to develop clear thinking, to vindicate right, and promote justice.", while later remarking after the end of World War I "the Negro is not like us" and "we learned that some [ethnic groups] we had believed possessed an order of intelligence perhaps superior to ours were far inferior.".^{102} Brian Regal has argued that Osborn's racial views were largely drawn from his scientific thinking, rather than "race hatred".^{103} According to Regal, over the course of his life, Osborns's views "evolved from a benign paternalism to a harder attitude and then to a increasing appreciation of human cultural and social diversity."^{102}

== Personal life ==
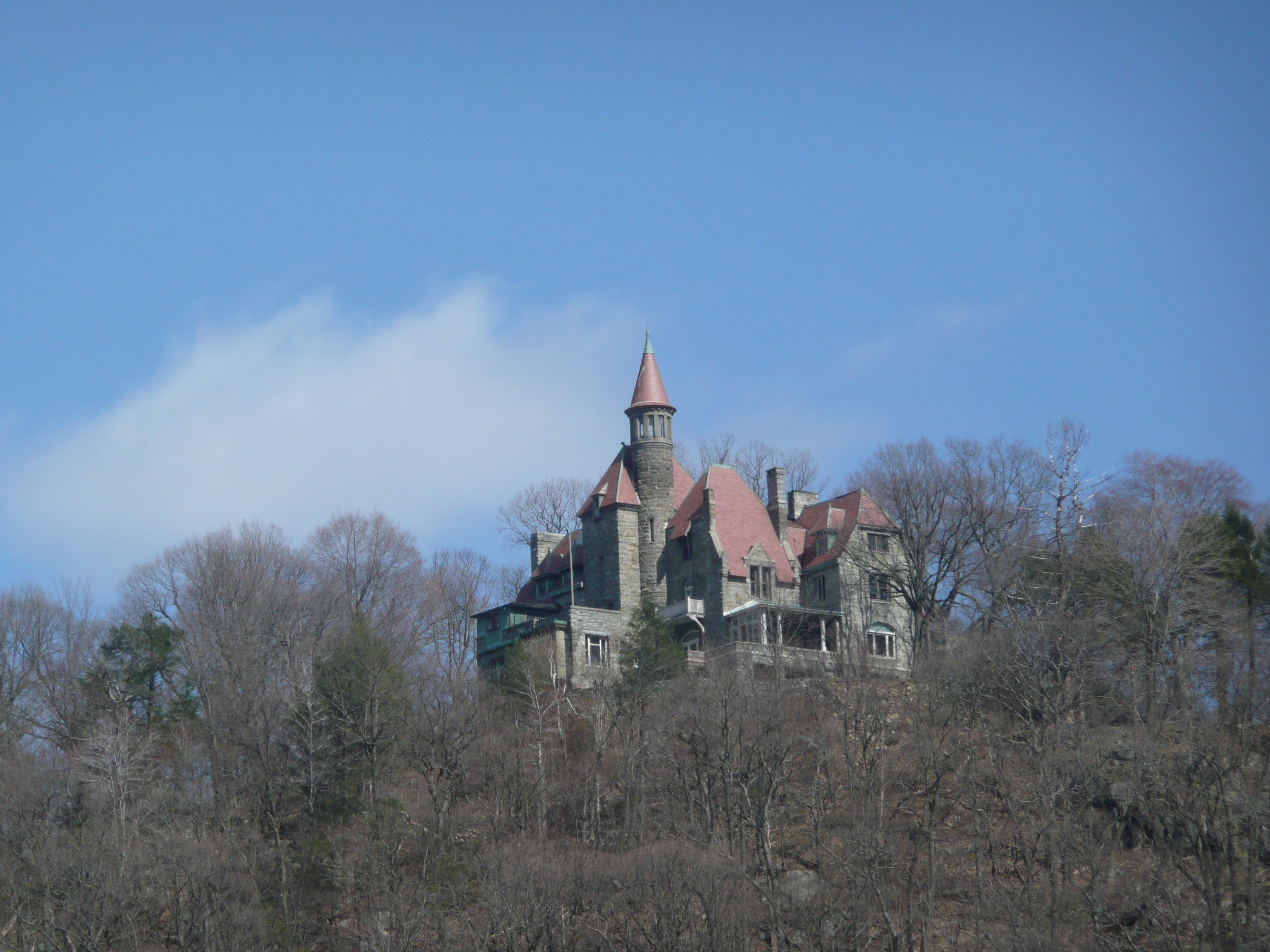
His country home, Castle Rock in Garrison, New York, 2009.

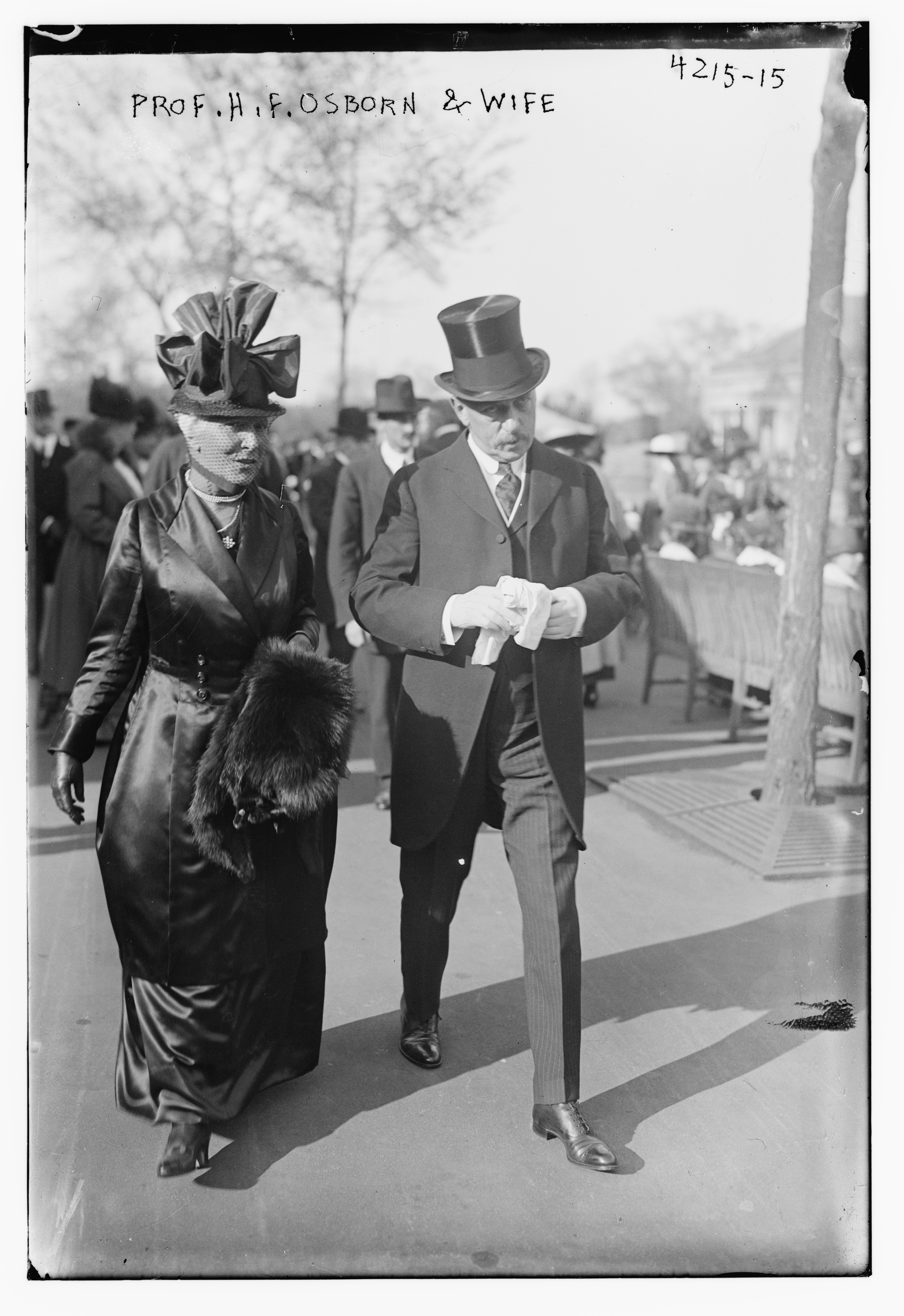
Osborn and his wife Lucretia

In June 1881, Osborn was married to writer Lucretia Thatcher Perry (1858–1930) at the military chapel on Governors Island. She was the daughter of Brigadier General Alexander James Perry and Josephine (Adams) Perry, and a descendant of Justice Christopher Raymond Perry). Lucretia's sister, Josephine Adams Perry, was the wife of banker Junius Spencer Morgan II. Thatcher Perry had five children with Osborn, including Henry Fairfield Osborn Jr., the naturalist and conservationist.

After his father's death in 1894, Osborn inherited his Rhenish style home, Castle Rock, in Garrison, New York in the Hudson Highlands, which his father had purchased in 1859, and where he concentrated on his philanthropy after his 1882 retirement. After his mother's death in 1902, the remainder of his parents' estate was equally divided between Henry and his brother William.

Following an "illness of nearly a year", his wife died at their country home in August 1930. Osborn died suddenly on November 6, 1935, in his study at Castle Rock, overlooking the Hudson River.

== Eponyms ==
The dinosaur Saurolophus osborni was named after Osborn by Barnum Brown in 1912.

An African dwarf crocodile, Osteolaemus osborni, was named in his honor by Karl Patterson Schmidt in 1919.

Also named in his honor is the early canid genus Osbornodon.

== Published books ==
- From the Greeks to Darwin: An Outline of the Development of the Evolution Idea (1894)
- Present Problems in Evolution and Heredity (1892)
- Evolution of Mammalian Molar Teeth: To and From the Triangular Type (1907)
- Men of the Old Stone Age: Their Environment, Life and Art (1915)
- The Origin and Evolution of Life (1916)
- Men of the Old Stone Age (1916)
- The Age of Mammals in Europe, Asia and North America (1910)
- Evolution and Religion (1923)
- Evolution And Religion In Education (1926)
- Man Rises to Parnassus: Critical Epochs in the Pre-History of Man (1927)
- Aristogenesis, the Creative Principle in the Origin of Species (1934)

== See also ==
- "The New Museum Idea"
