= William H. Osborn =

American businessman (1820–1894)

President of the Illinois Central Railroad
- In office December 1, 1855 – July 11, 1865
- Preceded by: John N. A. Griswold
- Succeeded by: John M. Douglas

Personal details
- Born: William Henry Osborn; December 21, 1820 Salem, Massachusetts, U.S.
- Died: March 2, 1894 (aged 73) New York City, U.S.
- Spouse: Virginia Reed Sturges (m. 1853)
- Relations: Henry Osborn Jr. (grandson); Frederick Osborn (grandson); Aileen Osborn Webb (granddaughter)
- Children: Henry Sr.; William
- Occupation: Businessman; philanthropist

William Henry Osborn (December 21, 1820 – March 2, 1894) was an American businessman and philanthropist. He was a railroad tycoon who, as head of the Illinois Central Railroad and later the Chicago, St. Louis and New Orleans Railroad, became one of the most prominent railroad leaders in the United States. A friend and patron of the painter Frederic Edwin Church, he was an avid art collector. His two sons went on to become presidents of prominent museums in New York City.

== Early life ==
Osborn was born to a farming family on December 21, 1820, in Salem, Massachusetts, where he was educated. He was the son of William Osborn and Lucy (née Bowditch) Osborn.

His first paternal American ancestor in the United States was William Osborn, who moved from England in 1684 and settled in Salem. From his mother's family, he was probably descended from the Salem navigator, Nathaniel Bowditch.

== Career ==
Osborn began his career with the Boston East India shipping company. In 1841, he went to Manila as a junior partner in the firm of Peel, Hubbell & Co. After ten years working in business in the Philippines, he took a financial interest in the Illinois Central Railroad in 1854. The Illinois Central, the first land grant railroad in the United States, was on the verge of bankruptcy in the wake of a stock scandal known as the Schuyler frauds that was connected with the New York and New Haven Railroad. One year after joining the railroad's board of directors, he was elected president, a position he held from December 1, 1855, until July 11, 1865.

Beginning in 1875 and 1882, Osborn was involved in the Chicago, St. Louis and New Orleans Railroad and guided the railroad from difficult economic times to profitability.

=== Philanthropy ===
In 1882, he retired from the railroad business to concentrate on philanthropy near his Rhenish style home, Castle Rock, in Garrison, New York, in the Hudson Highlands, which he purchased in 1859. He was involved with the New York Society for the Relief of the Ruptured and Crippled (today known as the Hospital for Special Surgery) and the Training School for Nurses at Bellevue Hospital.

Osborn was a patron and close friend of Richard Cobden (the English economist), Sir James Caird and Sir John Rose (who had both invested heavily in the Illinois Central).

== Art patron and collector ==
Osborn was also a close friend and patron of the Hudson River School landscape painter Frederic Edwin Church, who sold him works including The Andes of Ecuador, Chimborazo, and The Aegean Sea. Osborn's son, William Church, was named for Church. Church introduced Osborn to other artists, including Samuel W. Rowse and Erastus Dow Palmer, from whom Osborn also collected works, and may also have advised Osborn on the acquisition of European art. The siting of Castle Rock, Osborn's home overlooking the Hudson River in Garrison, was influenced by that of Church's home, Olana, in Greenport. Church died at the Osborns' Park Avenue townhouse on April 7, 1900, less than a year after his wife Isabel had also died there.

Osborn also collected paintings by other American artists, including Thomas Cole, Asher Durand, George Loring Brown, John Frederick Kensett, Sanford Robinson Gifford, John William Casilear, Henry Peters Gray, Emmanuel Leutze, Daniel Huntington and Louis Rémy Mignot, and European artists including Charles Landelle, Florent Willems, Franz Defregger, George Jacobides and Benjamin Vautier.

== Personal life ==
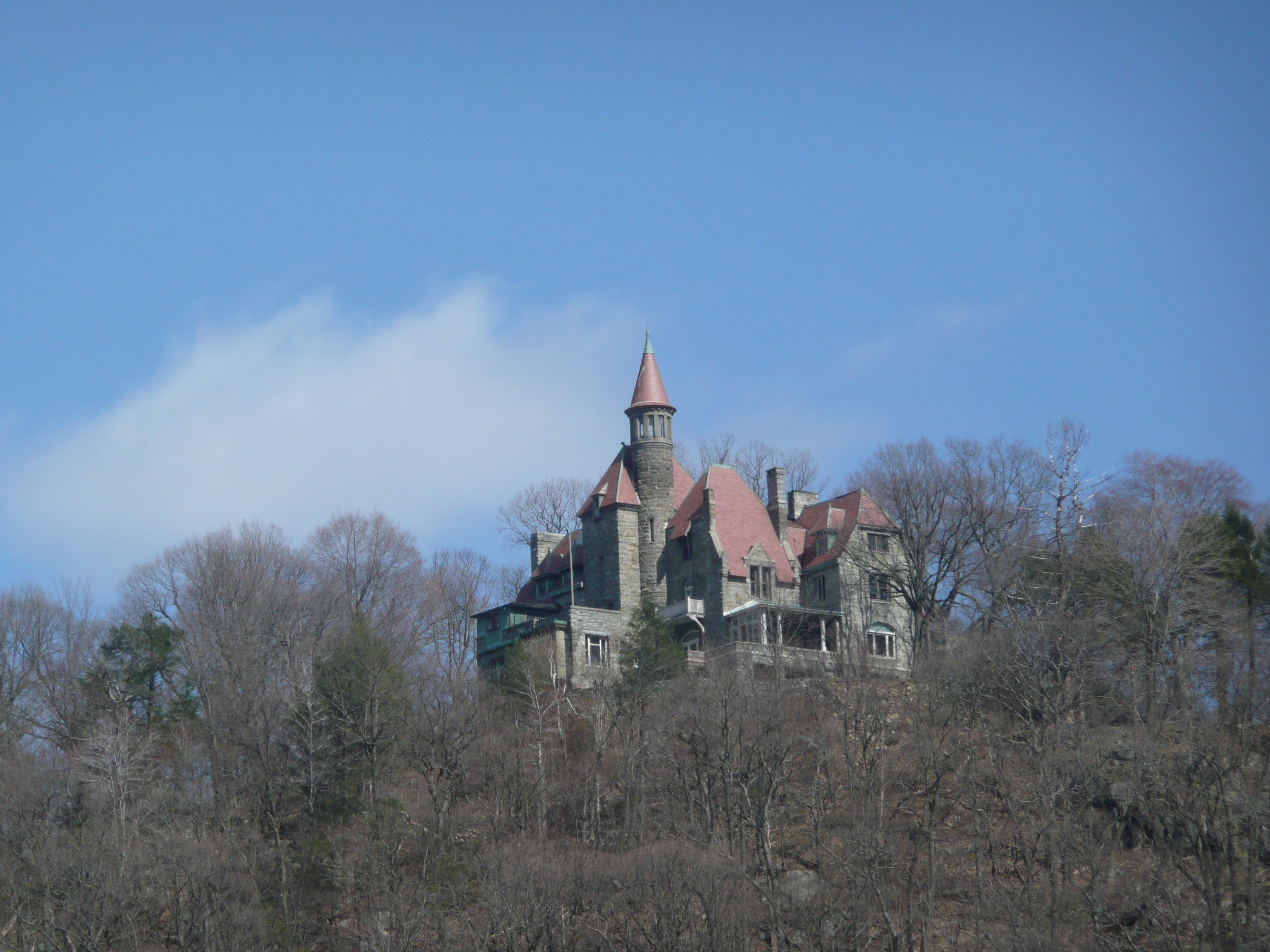
Osborn’s country home, Castle Rock, 2009

In 1853, Osborn married Virginia Reed Sturges (1830–1902). Virginia was the eldest daughter of businessman and arts patron Jonathan Sturges and his wife, Mary Pemberton (née Cady) Sturges. Her sister, Amelia Sturges, married J. Pierpont Morgan in 1861, but died of tuberculosis four months after their wedding, and her great-grandfather was Continental Congressman and U.S. Representative Jonathan Sturges. Together, Virginia and William were the parents of two sons:

- Henry Fairfield Osborn (1857–1935), a geologist, paleontologist, and eugenist who served as president of the American Museum of Natural History. He married writer Lucretia Thatcher Perry (1858–1930), daughter of Brigadier General Alexander James Perry, in 1881. Her sister, Josephine Adams Perry, married Junius Spencer Morgan II.
- William Church Osborn (1862–1951), who served as president of the Metropolitan Museum of Art. He married philanthropist and social reformer Alice Clinton Hoadley Dodge (1865–1946), a daughter of William E. Dodge Jr.

Osborn died in New York City on March 2, 1894. After a funeral at their city residence, 32 Park Avenue in Manhattan, officiated by the Rev. Drs. Joseph McIlvaine and Joseph Duryea, he was buried at Saint Philip's Church Cemetery in Garrison. His eldest son Henry inherited Castle Rock and after his wife's death on February 7, 1902, the remainder of the estate was equally divided between their sons.

=== Descendants ===
Through his son Henry, he was the grandfather of Alexander Perry Osborn (1884–1951); Henry Fairfield Osborn Jr. (1887–1969); and Gurdon Saltonstall Osborn (1895–1896), who died young.

Through his son William, he was the grandfather of Grace Dodge Osborn; Maj. Gen. Frederick Henry Osborn (1889–1981), who married Margaret Schieffelin (a descendant of John Jay); arts patron Aileen Hoadley Osborn (1892–1979), who married Vanderbilt Webb (son of Eliza Osgood Vanderbilt Webb, grandson of William Henry Vanderbilt and great-grandson of Cornelius Vanderbilt); Earl Dodge Osborn (1893–1988), who founded the EDO Corporation; William Henry Osborn II (1895–1971), a founder of Scenic Hudson.
