= New York State Route 403 =

State highway in Putnam County, New York, US

New York State Route 403
- Cat Rock Road
- Map of Putnam County in southeastern New York with NY 403 highlighted in red

Route information
- Maintained by NYSDOT
- Length: 2.27 mi (3.65 km)
- Existed: mid-1930s–present

Major junctions
- South end: US 9 / US 6 Alt. / US 202 Alt. in Philipstown
- North end: NY 9D / US 6 Alt. / US 202 Alt. in Philipstown

Location
- Country: United States
- State: New York
- Counties: Putnam

Highway system
- New York Highways; Interstate; US; State; Reference; Parkways
← NY 402	→ NY 404

New York State Route 403 (NY 403) is a 2.27-mile-long (3.65 km) state highway located entirely within Putnam County. It connects NY 9D in Philipstown at its northern end to US 9 in the hamlet of Graymoor, where the Appalachian Trail crosses both highways. At that intersection, NY 403 is signed as a route to the Bear Mountain Bridge. Half of its length is uphill going south.

== Route description ==
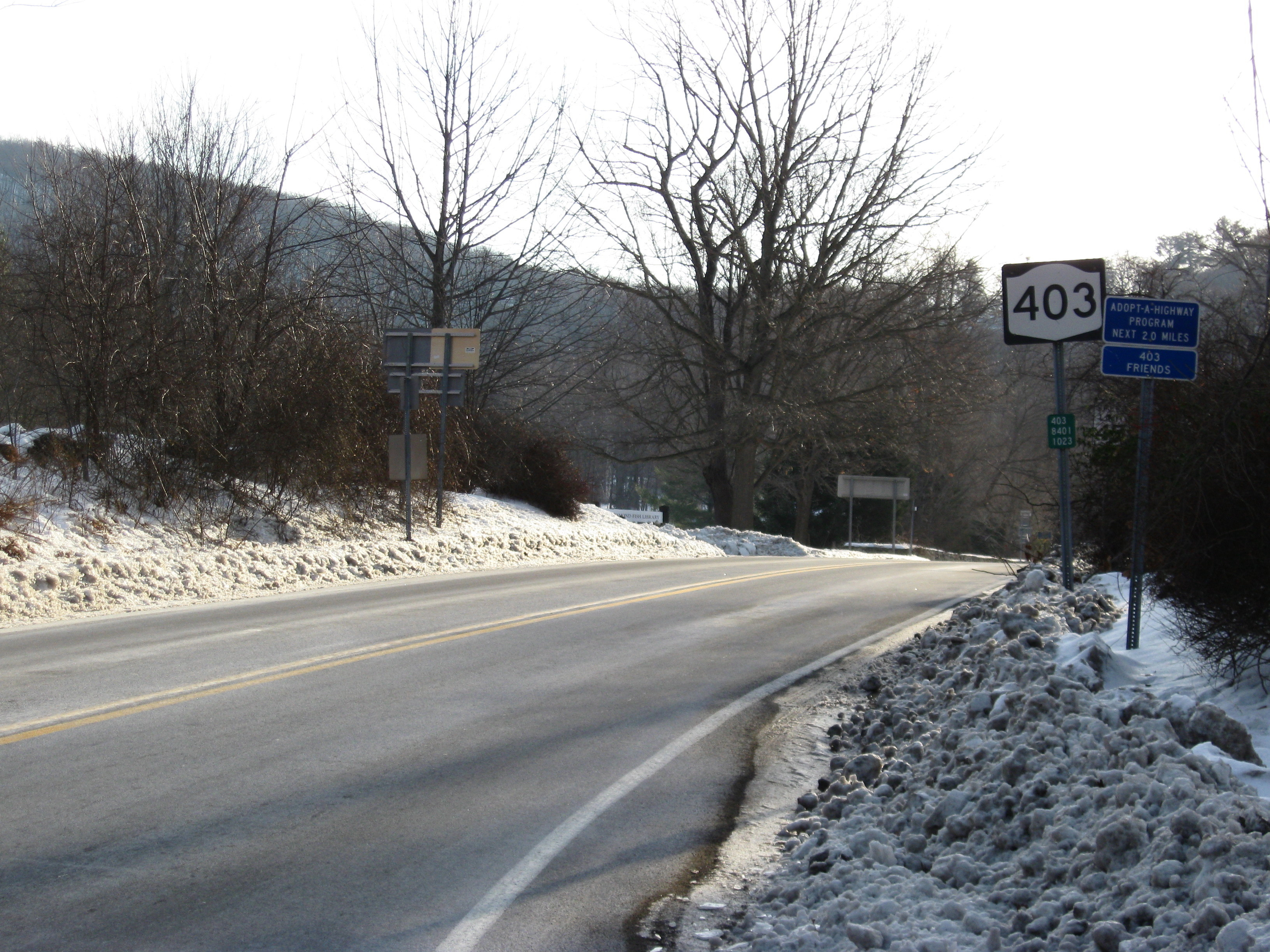
NY 403 begins here at NY 9D in Philipstown

NY 403 begins at an intersection with U.S. Route 9 (US 9) in the Philipstown hamlet of Graymoor. Also present at this intersection with the Appalachian Trail, which crosses US 9 at-grade. NY 403 heads up the hill overlook Graymoor to the west. NY 403 bends northwest at an old alignment of Cat Rock Road. Turning westward, NY 403 goes downhill past the Walker House, a house owned by Samuel Sloan, into the Highlands Country Club area of Philipstown. There, the route reaches an intersection with NY 9D. Present at this intersection is The Birches, a historic house built by Ralph Adams Cram. This marks the western terminus of NY 403. The road continues west as Putnam County Route 12, which descends into Garrison.

== History ==
The alignment of current NY 403 was known as the Cat Rock Road, named after a local rock where a wild cat was regularly spotted. In 1932, Putnam County added Cat Rock Road along with nine other historical road sites in the village of Cold Spring. However the quality of Cat Rock Road was in rough shape in 1933. Despite some surveyors present in June 1933, local pressure was followed by demands of the town of Philipstown to rebuild Cat Rock Road. However reconstruction of the road became a political debate. Members of the Democratic Party urged reconstruction of the roadway, while the Republican Party stalled on the work. In January 1934, Putnam County Board of Supervisors passed a resolution demanding that Cat Rock Road be surveyed. The primary use of Cat Rock Road was for those trying to get to NY 9D and avoid the Bear Mountain Bridge toll.

On January 23, 1934, the Board of Supervisors looked at acquiring right-of-way for the reconstruction of Cat Rock Road. On May 2, 1934, Cat Rock Road was added to the state highway map for reconstruction. However, reconstruction was delayed constantly, including Herbert Lehman's veto of construction on NY 9D in May 1934. As a result, this also delayed funding the Cat Rock Road work. Despite that, the local newspapers (The Beacon News and Peekskill Evening Star) endorsed construction of Cat Rock Road. They released editorials supporting the job noting that funding was available. However, the state released bid requests for Cat Rock Road in October 1934. Local residents were ready two weeks later to turn over some land for the reconstruction.

However, construction did not start before the calendar switched to 1935. The rights-of-way were all acquired in April 1935, which changed the name legally from Cat Rock Road to Garrison–Peekskill Road. With the road falling apart, the construction was dependent on federal funds from the Works Progress Administration. Despite the promising future, problems occurred in June 1935 noting that the State of New York had no money to fund construction and it would be requisite on all federal funds in July or August. In August 1935, the state expected the okay from the government for funding of Cat Rock Road's reconstruction. They noted the state signed off on everything and was just waiting on the federal government. Funding came through by September 1935, when bids were announced for the construction. These were led by A.E. Ottavino of Croton-on-Hudson for $152,697.70 (1935 USD). With the announcement of bids, it was expected that construction would begin in a few weeks.

Construction began in October 1935 on the reconstruction of Cat Rock Road. Construction progressed into 1936, with graving and excavation work for the new road, which had a slated completion date of December 31, 1936. After a stoppage in work due to weather, construction resumed in March 1936 with the beginning of blast work. The construction continued through June 1936, with the elimination of several tight curves and more retaining wall construction. Grading was finished in early June, and concrete pouring began in August. On August 21, it was announced that Cat Rock Road would open to traffic on October 1, 1936. On September 17, 1936, the concrete was finished. Asphalt was applied to the intersections in September 1936 to help drivers.

Despite the October 1 opening date, Cat Rock Road opened to both directions of traffic in late September 1936, despite some minimal work required to finish the 2.30-mile (3.70 km) road.

The entirety of NY 403 was assigned at some point between 1933 and 1936.

== Major intersections ==
The entire route is in Philipstown, Putnam County.

mi	km	Destinations	Notes
0.00	0.00	US 9 / US 6 Alt. east / US 202 Alt. east – Fishkill, Peekskill	Southern terminus; southern end of US 6 Alt./US 202 Alt. concurrency
2.27	3.65	NY 9D / US 6 Alt. west / US 202 Alt. west – Bear Mountain Bridge, Cold Spring	Northern terminus; northern end of US 6 Alt./US 202 Alt. concurrency
1.000 mi = 1.609 km; 1.000 km = 0.621 mi: Concurrency terminus
