= Garrison Landing Historic District =

Historic district in New York, United States

- U.S. National Register of Historic Places
- U.S. Historic district
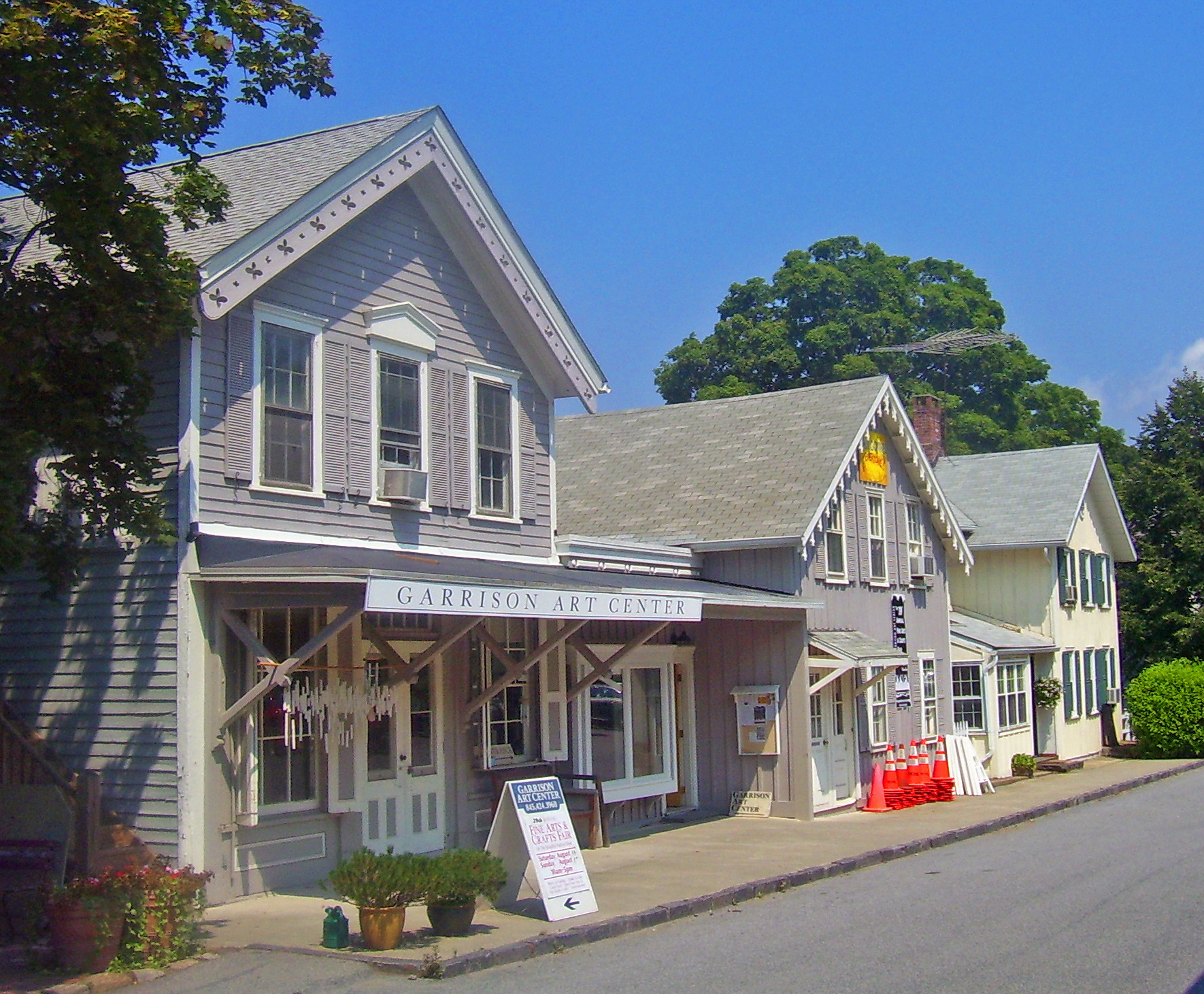
- East (front) elevation of Garrison Art Center and other mid-19th-century commercial buildings, 2008

- Location within New York Location within the United States
- Location: Garrison, New York
- Nearest city: Peekskill
- Coordinates: 41°22′57″N 73°56′49″W
- Area: 5.3 acres (2.1 ha)
- Built: 19th century
- Architectural style: Late Victorian
- MPS: Hudson Highlands MRA
- NRHP reference No.: 82001243
- Added to NRHP: November 23, 1982

The Garrison Landing Historic District, also known as Garrison's Landing, is a small commercial and residential area located between what is now the Metro-North Hudson Line and the Hudson River in Garrison, New York, United States. Its buildings were mostly erected in the 1850s, around the time the Hudson River Railroad, later the New York Central, laid the tracks. Much of the construction was spearheaded by the president of a local ferry company to provide rental housing for local workers. His descendants lived in the area until the late 20th century and led efforts to preserve it, founding and helping to run two organizations for that purpose.

Its architecture remained well preserved enough that in the late 1960s the producers of the film version of Hello, Dolly filmed scenes here set in 1890 Yonkers, and made some improvements to the district that still exist. In 1982 the 5.3-acre (2.1 ha) historic district was listed on the National Register of Historic Places as part of the Hudson Highlands Multiple Resource Area. Until 2008 it was also home to Guinan's, an Irish pub well known outside the area, and the subject of a book by journalist Gwendolyn Bounds.

== Geography ==
The district's boundaries are the river on the west, the railroad tracks on the east, Dock Road on the north and the end of Depot Square, just north of the current train station, on the south. That area includes 17 buildings and structures, most of them contributing properties to the district's historic character, on Depot Square and Dock Road plus the open areas extending to the river behind them.

Most of the buildings are located on the west side of Depot Square, the main road into the district, which dead-ends at the southern boundary. The former train station, now a community theater, is the only building between Depot Square and the tracks. They are a mix of commercial and residential use. The few buildings on the very short Dock Road are residential. All buildings in the district use Garrison Landing as their address rather than the street name.

There is a marina with open, grassy common and gazebo at the southwestern corner of the district. Views of the U.S. Military Academy at West Point across the river are available from most of the district.

Most of the buildings are frame houses in the Andrew Jackson Downing-inspired Carpenter Gothic style. There are only three significant buildings in other materials, the Golden Eagle hotel in brick, the stone former train station and the former Guinan's Pub in stucco. An early house on the river, past the end of Dock Street, uses brick in part.

== History ==
The earliest extant building in the district is the 2 1/2-story home of Henry White Belcher, owner of the Garrison and West Point Ferry Company. His home, sided in brick on the first story but shiplap above, dates to 1800 and occupied by the Belcher family until late in the 20th century. When the railroad began construction, in the 1850s, Belcher built most of the other homes in the district as tenant properties, to be rented to both his employees and those working at the large riverfront estates nearby.

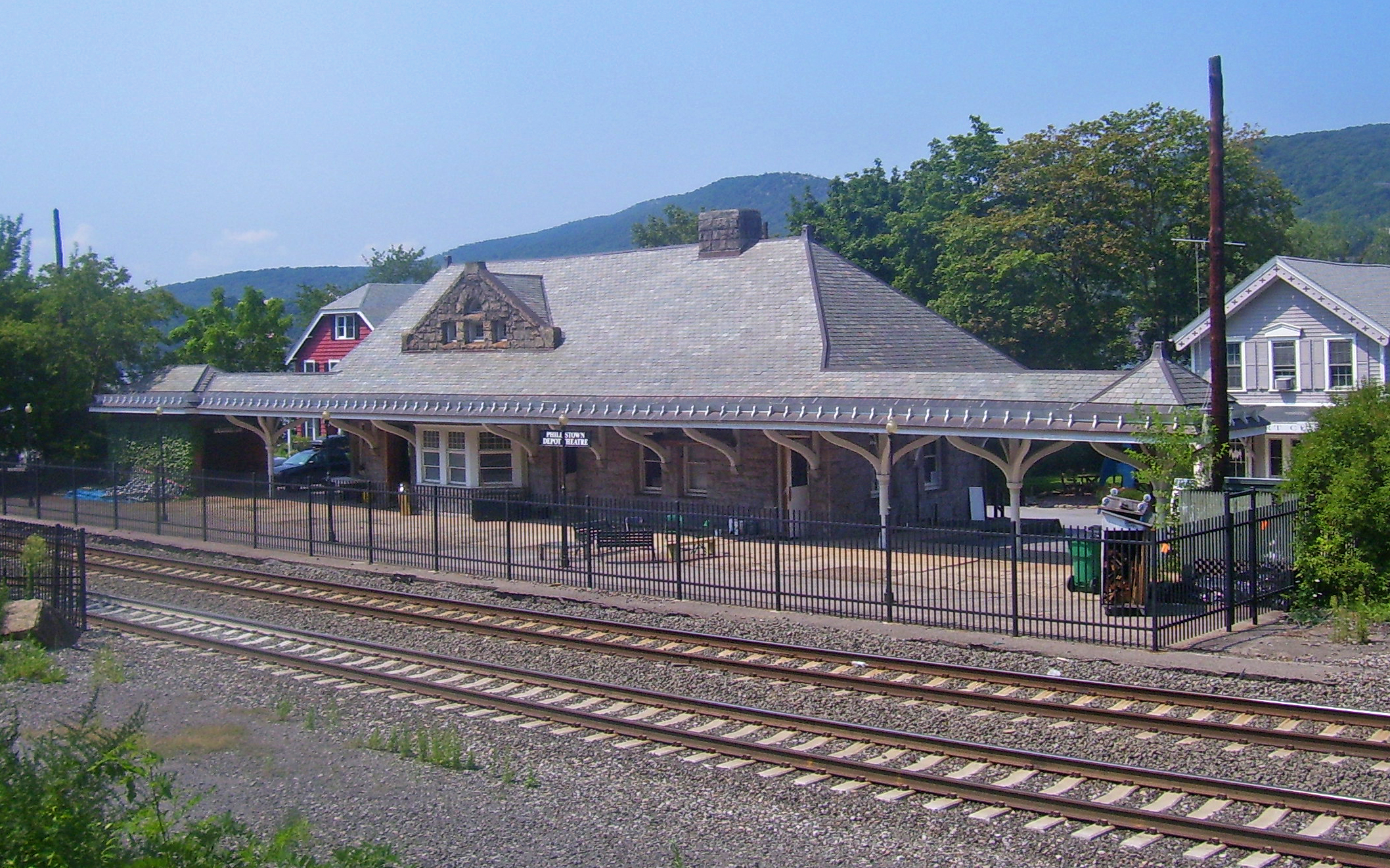
The 1892-built train station, now the Philipstown Depot Theatre

Most were the frame Carpenter Gothic buildings, reflecting the new style of the era. The Golden Eagle Hotel, on Dock Road, completed in 1854, was an exception. It is a three-story brick building on a stone foundation with molded wooden trim on the windows, brick drip moldings, a porch with paneled piers on the ground level and corner brackets and railings, and gabled roof. Near the southern end of the district, one building would be faced in stucco.

In 1892, the Golden Eagle would be joined by the Central's new station building. It mixed elements of the Italianate, Victorian Gothic and Hudson River Bracketed styles, an eclecticism common in the Central's Hudson Valley stations. It is a one-story stone building with a hipped roof that curves at the end, roof finials, and wood brackets on corbel supports. The original 1850s frame station, which had been on the site, was relocated nearby.

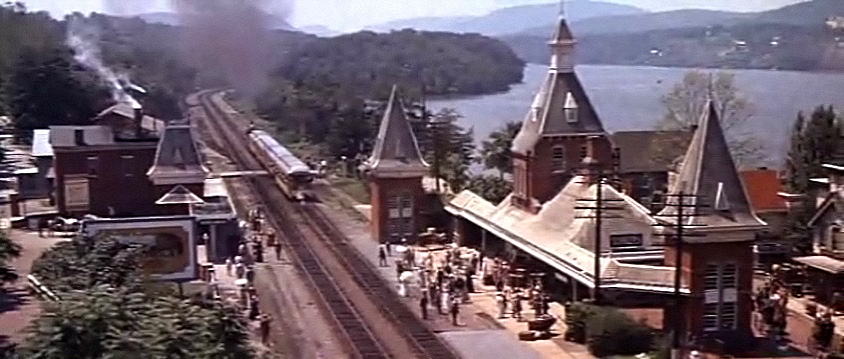
Garrison Landing as 1890s Yonkers in Hello, Dolly!

Some additional frame buildings were constructed in the early 20th century. There were no other changes to the district or its buildings throughout the next several decades other than the installation of asbestos siding to some of them. In 1968, the Hello Dolly production crew repainted several of the more visible buildings, added a cupola to the train station (since removed) and built the gazebo in the open area near the marina.

Since its listing on the Register, the district has become a local arts and cultural center. The train station has been home to the Philipstown Depot Theatre since 1996.

=== Guinan's Pub ===
In 1959 an Irish immigrant, Jim Guinan, opened Guinan's, an Irish pub in the stucco building at the south end of the district. Over time, it became a local institution, the subject of a book called Little Chapel on the River by Wall Street Journal reporter Gwendolyn Bounds, and a popular stop for commuters getting coffee and doughnuts in the morning and a drink in the afternoon, after the current station was built in the early 1980s right next to it. News of its closing upon Guinan's retirement in early 2007 led to efforts that postponed that for a year. Its closure inspired a play and the recording of a CD of songs frequently performed at the pub's monthly Irish Nights.

The building has been renovated and now includes upscale Dolly's restaurant named after the movie Hello Dolly. Residents want Garrison Station Plaza Inc. (GSP), one of the two entities that own most of the district's buildings, to continue the same use so that the Landing will continue to have a cafe or similar business. The company has submitted a request to the town to convert it to offices and an apartment.

== Preservation ==
GSP is a for-profit real estate company owned by the non-profit Garrison Landing Association, both chaired at one time by Taylor Belcher, a descendant of Henry. The two entities between them own 10 of the 17 properties in the district, and are charged with maintaining its historic character.

The Town of Philipstown zones the district in one of its two business classifications. There is no historic overlay district.

== See also ==
- National Register of Historic Places listings in Putnam County, New York
