= New York State Route 9D =

Highway in New York

New York State Route 9D
- Map of the Hudson Valley with NY 9D highlighted in red

Route information
- Auxiliary route of US 9
- Maintained by NYSDOT and the city of Beacon
- Length: 25.21 mi (40.57 km)
- Existed: 1935–present

Major junctions
- South end: US 6 / US 202 in Cortlandt
- NY 403 in Philipstown; NY 301 in Cold Spring; I-84 / NY 52 in Beacon
- North end: US 9 / CR 77 in Wappingers Falls

Location
- Country: United States
- State: New York
- Counties: Westchester, Putnam, Dutchess

Highway system
- New York Highways; Interstate; US; State; Reference; Parkways
← NY 9B	→ US 9E

New York State Route 9D (NY 9D) is a north–south state highway in the Hudson Valley region of New York in the United States. It starts at the eastern end of the Bear Mountain Bridge at an intersection with U.S. Route 6 (US 6) and US 202 in Westchester County, and follows the eastern shore of the Hudson River for 25.21 miles (40.57 km) to a junction with US 9 north of the village of Wappingers Falls in Dutchess County. While US 9 follows a more inland routing between the bridge and Wappingers Falls, the riverside course of NY 9D takes the route through the village of Cold Spring and the city of Beacon.

The route was acquired by the state of New York in pieces over the course of the early 20th century. The part north of Beacon was entirely state-maintained by the end of the 1910s, while delays in rebuilding the remainder of the highway to state highway standards kept New York from fully acquiring the road until the early 1930s. NY 9D was assigned as part of the 1930 renumbering of state highways in New York, extending only from Beacon to Wappingers Falls. It was extended south to the Bear Mountain Bridge by the following year.

== Route description ==
=== Westchester and Putnam counties ===
Like its parent road, US 9, NY 9D runs north–south parallel to the Hudson River for its entire length. The route begins near the riverbank at the Bear Mountain Bridge in the Westchester County town of Cortlandt, where it meets US 6 and US 202 at the foot of Anthony's Nose. It heads to the northeast as a two-lane road known as the Bear Mountain–Beacon Highway, passing through dense forests in the undeveloped northwestern part of Camp Smith. After just a quarter-mile (0.4 km), NY 9D leaves the military reservation as it passes into Putnam County and the town of Philipstown. Here, the route crosses the Appalachian Trail and runs adjacent to part of Hudson Highlands State Park, a preserve covering three non-contiguous areas between Peekskill and Beacon.

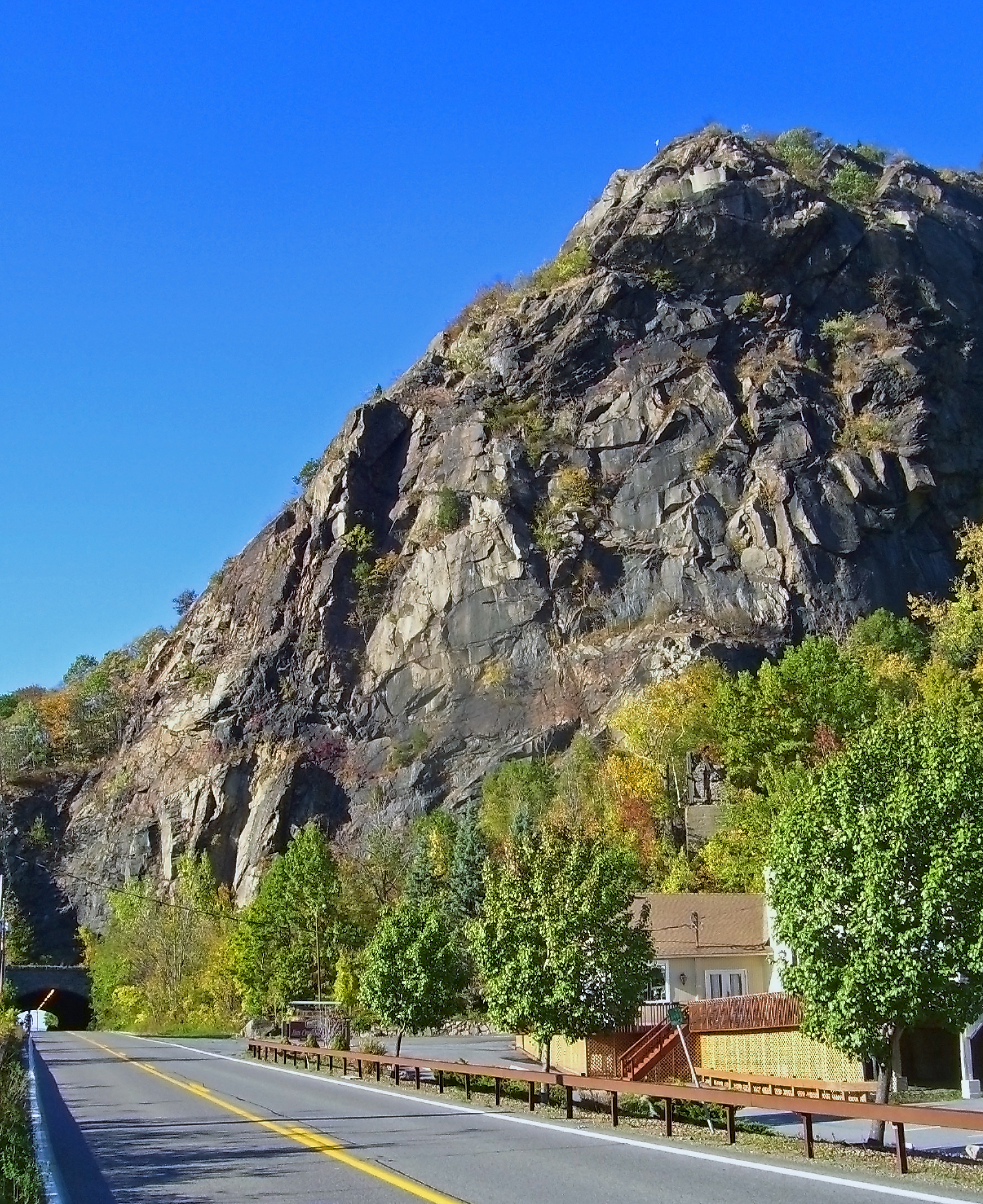
Breakneck Ridge and the tunnel

From the county line to the hamlet of Garrison, a distance of 4 miles (6.4 km), NY 9D passes a few historical areas, such as the house Benedict Arnold was holed up in prior to his treason, the point of land where he caught the ship downriver to New York City, and the eastern end of the chain that was strung across the Hudson River during the American Revolution to prevent ships from coming upriver north of West Point. The highway serves a small number of isolated homes on its way to Garrison, where it meets the western terminus of NY 403 at a junction adjacent to The Birches and the Garrison Grist Mill Historic District. NY 403 is the first of several roads directly connecting NY 9D to US 9, which follows a generally parallel alignment 1.5 miles (2.4 km) east of the former through southern Putnam County.

From Garrison, NY 9D heads through a 5-mile (8 km) stretch of lightly developed areas, intersecting County Route 11 (CR 11, named Snake Hill Road), another connector to US 9, and passing the Boscobel mansion on its way into the village of Cold Spring. The highway, now named Chestnut Street, heads generally westward to the center of the village, where NY 9D intersects Main Street, designated as NY 301 east of this point. On the opposite side of the intersection, NY 9D changes names to Morris Avenue for a half-mile (0.8 km) before exiting Cold Spring on a northwesterly track. Past the village line, the route parallels the Metro-North Railroad for 2 miles (3 km) through another portion of Hudson Highlands State Park. This section of the route, located mere yards from the river, is locally known as the River Road, for its close proximity to the river, and The Flats, for its relatively consistent elevation. The two-mile stretch leads to a tunnel through the Breakneck Ridge, which carries NY 9D across the Putnam–Dutchess county line.

=== Dutchess County ===
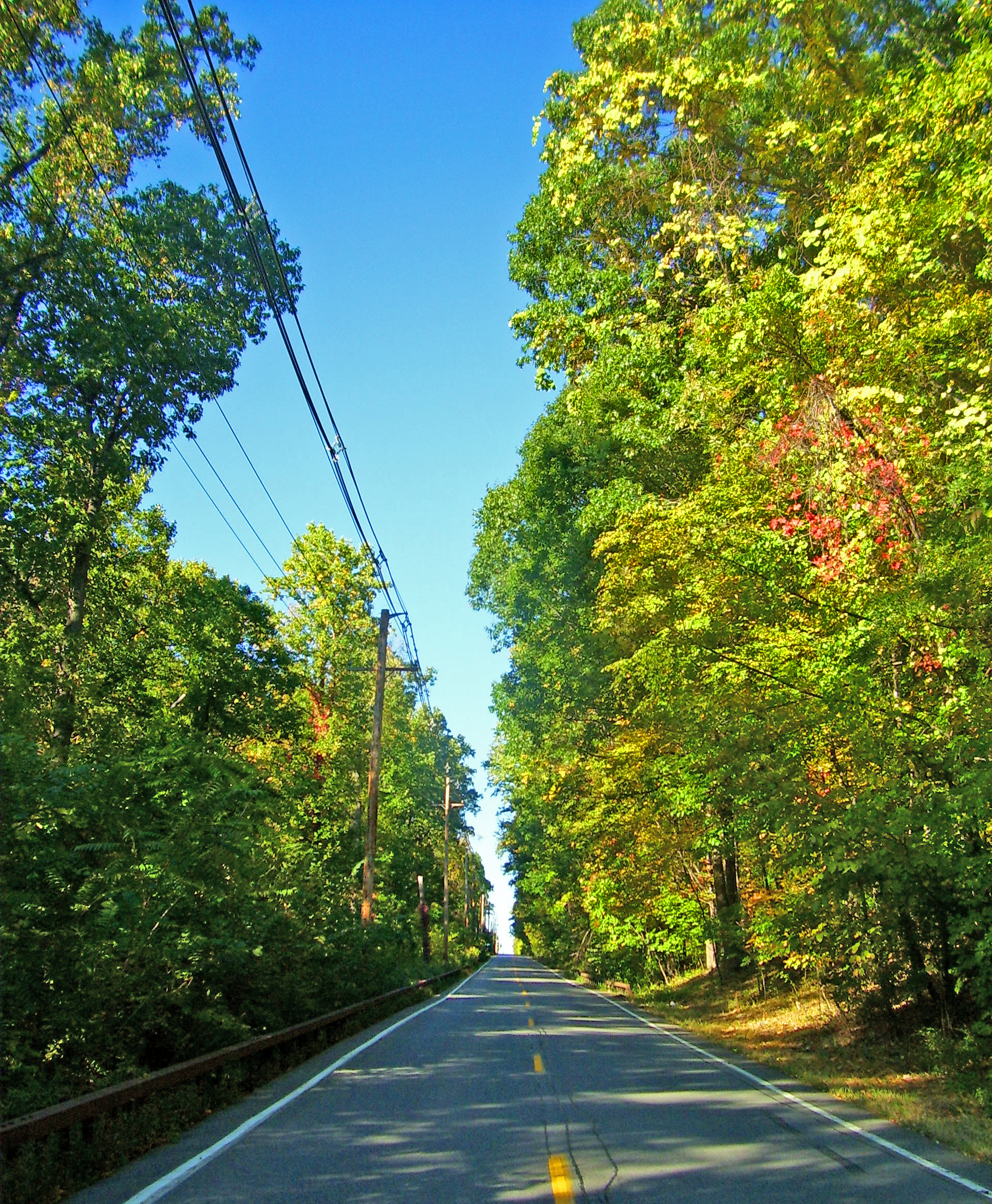
Approaching Beacon on NY 9D northbound

Heading away from the ridge, NY 9D continues on a northerly path through the town of Fishkill, serving the Breakneck Ridge station on the Metro-North Railroad before turning northeastward and diverging from the Metro-North line and the Hudson River. The road soon reaches the southern edge of the city of Beacon, where it becomes Wolcott Avenue and the surroundings transition from rural mountainous scenery to an urban setting. Maintenance of the route also shifts from the New York State Department of Transportation (NYSDOT) to the city. Upon reaching the city center, NY 9D traverses a 90-degree bend to the northwest and becomes the main north–south street through the city. The highway crosses Fishkill Creek ahead of another 90-degree turn, this time to the northeast, giving NY 9D an S-shaped alignment as it travels through downtown Beacon. State maintenance of the road resumes one block east of the northeasterly bend.

North of the turn, NY 9D intersects Main Street, which carries NY 52 Business through Beacon's central business district. NY 52 Business turns north onto NY 9D here, forming a concurrency along the latter as Wolcott Avenue changes names to North Avenue. The overlapping routes wind their way northward through several residential blocks to reach an interchange with Interstate 84 (I-84) and NY 52 just north of the city limits in Fishkill. NY 52 Business terminates at the junction while NY 9D continues to meander northeastward through the northernmost part of the town. The highway runs by several housing tracts and Dutchess Stadium, the home of the Hudson Valley Renegades, a Single-A Minor League Baseball team, before crossing into the adjacent town of Wappinger.

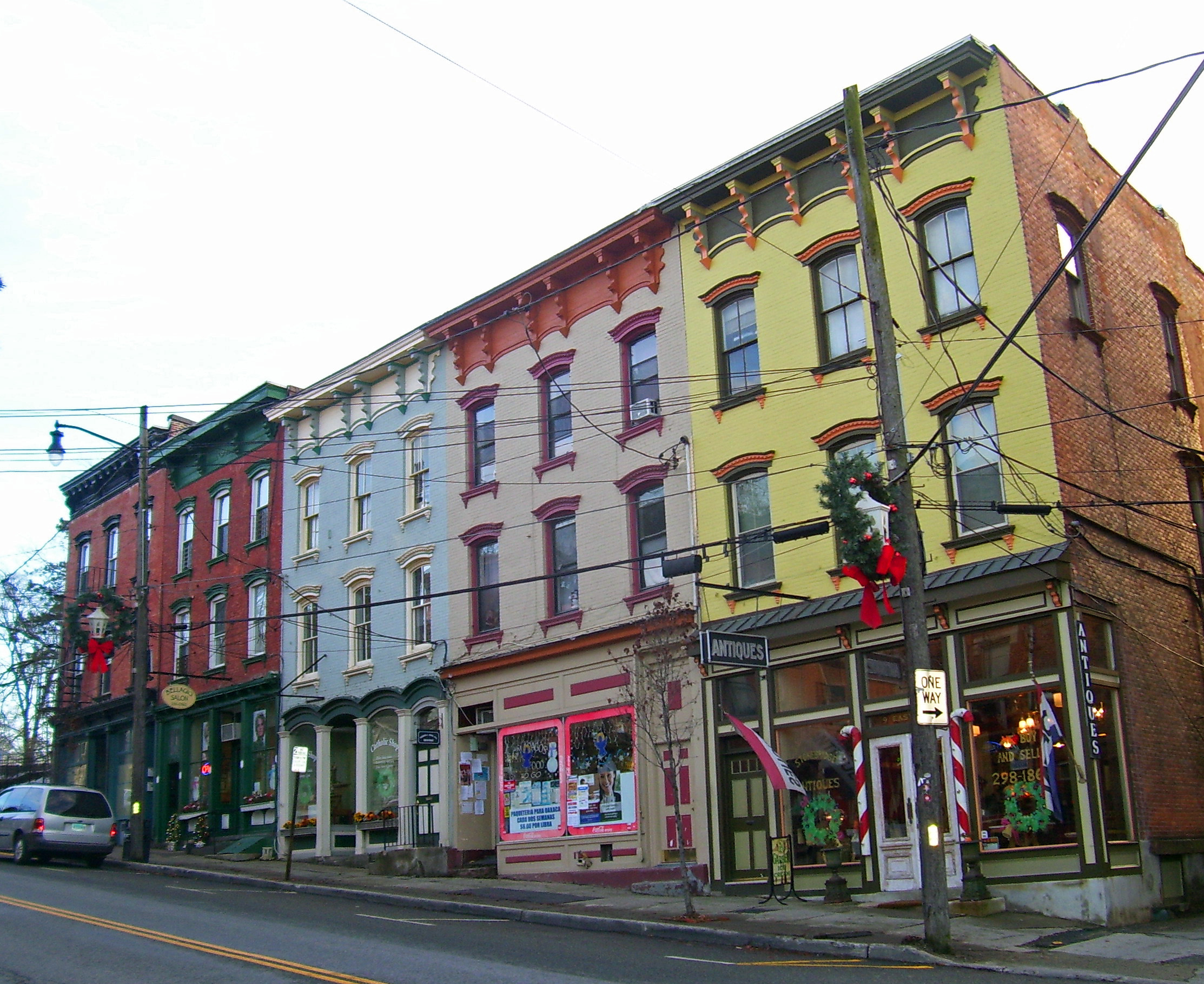
Downtown Wappingers Falls

Across the town line, the road takes on a straighter northeasterly track that brings it east of the hamlets of Chelsea and New Hamburg, both of which lie roughly 1 mile (1.6 km) to the west on the banks of the Hudson. NY 9D connects to Chelsea by way of CR 92 just north of the town line, while New Hamburg is accessed via CR 28 in the community of Hughsonville. From CR 28, the highway continues into the nearby village of Wappingers Falls, which it enters from the south as South Avenue. NY 9D traverses several blocks of homes on the eastern edge of the Wappingers Falls Historic District before it meets East Main Street at a T-intersection in the center of the village. Mesier Park is straight ahead, and the Wappingers Falls Village Hall is on the southeastern corner of the junction.

South Avenue ends at this point, leaving NY 9D to turn northwest onto East Main Street. The highway follows East Main Street for several blocks through the central village district before crossing Wappinger Creek, which serves as the boundary between the towns of Wappinger and Poughkeepsie. Past the creek, the route changes names to West Main Street and makes a sharp bend to the north, passing the Bain Commercial Building and running alongside Wappinger Lake for a short distance before leaving the village limits. The road serves a handful of homes on the northern fringe of Wappinger Falls prior to entering a commercial district surrounding a junction with US 9 near the South Hills Mall and the Poughkeepsie Galleria. NY 9D ends here while its right-of-way continues past US 9 as County Route 77 (Vassar Road).

== History ==
Modern NY 9D was acquired by the state of New York in stages over the course of the early 20th century. The first section to become a state highway was the piece between the Fishkill–Wappinger town line and the village of Wappingers Falls, which was added to the state highway system on June 28, 1905. State maintenance was extended south to the Beacon city line on December 30, 1907. In 1908, the New York State Legislature created Route 2, an unsigned legislative route following the Albany Post Road from New York City to Valatie. The post road originally passed through Wappingers Falls, entering from the southeast on East Main Street and leaving to the north on West Main Street. The road's northern approach to the village was taken over by the state of New York on July 6, 1911.

South Avenue in Wappingers Falls became state-maintained on February 15, 1917, extending state ownership north from the village line to South Avenue's junction with East Main Street. The part of Main Street between South Avenue and the northern village limits was added as a state road on January 5, 1918. When the first set of posted routes in New York were assigned in 1924, Main Street became part of NY 6, which followed all of legislative Route 2 north of Ossining. NY 6 was replaced by US 9 in 1927 following the creation of the U.S. Highway System.

The part of what is now NY 9D south of Beacon remained an unimproved local road through the mid-1920s. The reconstruction of this segment was authorized in 1925, and the highway was designated as legislative Route 2-a on April 2 of that year. Construction on parts of the road was stalled for years, however, with the delay on the stretch north of Cold Spring being attributed to problems in acquiring the highway's right-of-way. Work on the portion south of Garrison was completed by February 1930. In the 1930 renumbering of state highways in New York, the Beacon–Wappingers Falls state highway was designated as NY 9D while the road between the Bear Mountain Bridge and Garrison became part of NY 9C, which continued north to Cold Spring and south through Peekskill to Croton-on-Hudson.

NY 9D was extended south to the Bear Mountain Bridge by the following year, replacing NY 9C from Cold Spring to the bridge. The reconstruction of the Garrison–Cold Spring stretch was finished by February 1931, and the Cold Spring–Beacon link was opened in October 1932. Various festivities were held in Beacon on October 20 to mark the occasion. In the early to mid-1930s, US 9 was realigned near Wappingers Falls to follow a new highway bypassing the village to the east, even though the project was staunchly opposed by the village's chamber of commerce. The northern half of US 9's former routing through the village became an extension of NY 9D.

== Major intersections ==
County	Location	mi	km	Destinations	Notes
Westchester	Cortlandt	0.00	0.00	US 6 / US 202 (Bear Mountain Bridge) to US 9W / Palisades Parkway south – Bear Mountain, New York City US 6 Alt. begins / US 202 Alt. begins	Southern terminus; southern terminus of US 6 Alt./US 202 Alt.
Putnam	Philipstown	4.54	7.31	NY 403 south / US 6 Alt. east / US 202 Alt. east – Peekskill	Northern end of US 6 Alt./US 202 Alt. concurrency; northern terminus of NY 403
Putnam	Cold Spring	8.64	13.90	NY 301 east (Main Street) – Carmel	Western terminus of NY 301
Dutchess	Beacon	16.35	26.31	NY 52 Bus. east (Main Street) – Fishkill	Southern end of NY 52 Bus. concurrency
Dutchess	Town of Fishkill	17.13	27.57	I-84 / NY 52 (Newburgh–Beacon Bridge) to I-87 / New York Thruway / Taconic State Parkway – Newburgh, Danbury NY 52 Bus. ends	Western terminus of NY 52 Bus.; exit 11 on I-84
Dutchess	Town of Poughkeepsie	25.21	40.57	US 9 / CR 77 north – Poughkeepsie, Hyde Park	Northern terminus; southern terminus of CR 77
1.000 mi = 1.609 km; 1.000 km = 0.621 mi: Concurrency terminus
