= Kenneth Oakley =

- Born: Kenneth Page Oakley; 7 April 1911; Amersham, Buckinghamshire
- Died: 2 November 1981 (aged 70); Amersham
- Known for: relative dating of fossils by fluorine content
- Awards: Prestwich Medal (1963)
- Scientific career
- Fields: physical anthropologist

Kenneth Page Oakley (7 April 1911 – 2 November 1981) was an English physical anthropologist, palaeontologist and geologist.

Oakley, known for his work in the Fluorine absorption dating of fossils by fluorine content, was instrumental in the exposure of the Piltdown Man hoax in the 1950s.

Oakley was born and died in Amersham, Buckinghamshire.

== Education ==
Oakley attended Dr Challoner's Grammar School in Amersham, Buckinghamshire before studying geology at University College London, where he earned his BSc and PhD in the subject.

== Career ==
=== Publications ===
Over the course of his life, Kenneth Oakley authored and contributed to several publications that developed the field of human evolution. One of these publications is the book Man the Tool-Maker (1949) in which he thoroughly outlines the discoveries of pre-hominin and hominin tool use. Oakley does so by walking the reader through the historical background of the previous conceptions of evolution, considering why tool use may have started, various tool compositions and purposes as discovered through fossils, and how tool use may have influenced the development of unique cultures. Oakley also includes several illustrations ranging from diagrams illustrating how tools may have been used and actual images of fossilised tools as they have changed over time. Man the Tool-Maker has been republished several times since its initial publication in 1949, amounting to a total of six separate editions by 1976.

Another source that Oakley contributed to is the Catalogue of Fossil Hominids Part III: Americas, Asia, Australasia which he, Bernard Grant Campbell, and Theya Ivitsky Molleson all edited. This catalogue, including Part I: Africa and Part II: Europe, organised all the identifying information of the hominids that had been discovered until that time in the late 1960s and early 1970s, including where they were discovered, the key features of the specimen, and their archeological contexts. Oakley was tasked with providing confirmation of the geological and absolute ages of the specimens, since that was considered his speciality.

==== Other Publications with Contributions by Oakley ====
- Man the Toolmaker, 1949; 6th ed, British Museum,1972
- Piltdown man, Bobbs-Merrill, 1955
- The succession of life through geological time, British Museum, 1967
- Frameworks for dating fossil man, Weidenfeld & Nicolson; 3rd ed, 1969
- Catalogue of Fossil Hominids: Africa, British Museum, 1977
- Relative dating of the fossil hominids of Europe, British Museum, 1980

=== Exposure of Piltdown Man Hoax ===
In November 1953 Oakley, along with Drs. J. S. Weiner and W. E. le Gros Clark published The Solution of the Piltdown Problem in the Bulletin of The British Museum of Natural History: Geology Department. This publication provided the discovered evidence that proved the "Piltdown Man", a skull that was initially deemed a new species and potential "missing link" called Eoanthropus dawsoni that had been discovered in 1913 by archeologist Charles Dawson, was in fact a hoax. Through a complete re-analysis of the specimen's teeth abrasion, fluorine content, nitrogen content, and colouring, Oakley and his colleagues concluded that the skull fragments were not from a single specimen. Instead, it appeared that the skull was a fabrication produced out of a modern ape mandible that had been skilfully fused to the cranial fragments of another species.

This discovery by Oakley and his colleagues resulted in a vital reconstruction of the existing fossil record, leading to the removal of Eoanthropus dawsoni, enabling properly conducted research into other evidence of human evolution in other parts of the world to be encouraged.
