= Missing link (human evolution) =

Non-scientific term for a transitional fossil

"Missing link" is a non-scientific term that typically refers to transitional fossils. It is often used in popular science and in the media for any new transitional form. The term originated to describe the hypothetical intermediate form in the evolutionary series of anthropoid ancestors to anatomically modern humans (hominization). The term was influenced by the pre-Darwinian evolutionary theory of the Great Chain of Being and the now-outdated notion that simple organisms are more primitive than complex organisms (orthogenesis).

The term "missing link" has fallen out of favor with anthropologists because it implies the evolutionary process is a linear phenomenon and that forms originate consecutively in a chain. Instead, last common ancestor is preferred since this does not have the connotation of linear evolution, as evolution is a branching process. Creationists have used the concept of a missing link to argue that evolution is not a valid theory.

There is no singular missing link. The scarcity of transitional fossils can be attributed to the incompleteness of the fossil record.

== Historical origins ==
The term "missing link" was influenced by the 18th-century Enlightenment thinkers such as Alexander Pope and Jean-Jacques Rousseau who thought of humans as links in the Great Chain of Being, a hierarchical structure of all matter and life. Influenced by Aristotle's theory of higher and lower animals, the Great Chain of Being was created during the medieval period in Europe and was strongly influenced by religious thought. God was at the top of the chain followed by man and then animals. It was during the 18th century that the set nature of species and their immutable place in the great chain was questioned. The dual nature of the chain, divided yet united, had always allowed for seeing creation as essentially one continuous whole, with the potential for overlap between the links. Radical thinkers like Jean-Baptiste Lamarck saw a progression of life forms from the simplest creatures striving towards complexity and perfection, a schema accepted by zoologists like Henri de Blainville. The very idea of an ordering of organisms, even if supposedly fixed, laid the basis for the idea of transmutation of species, for example Charles Darwin's theory of evolution.

The earliest publication that explicitly uses the term “missing link” was in 1844 in Vestiges of the Natural History of Creation by Robert Chambers, which uses the term in an evolutionary context relating to gaps in the fossil record. Charles Lyell employed the term a few years later in 1851 in his third edition of Elements of Geology too as a metaphor for the missing gaps in the continuity of the geological column. It was used as a name for transitional types between different taxa in 1863, in Lyell's Geological Evidences of the Antiquity of Man.

== Historical beliefs about the missing link ==
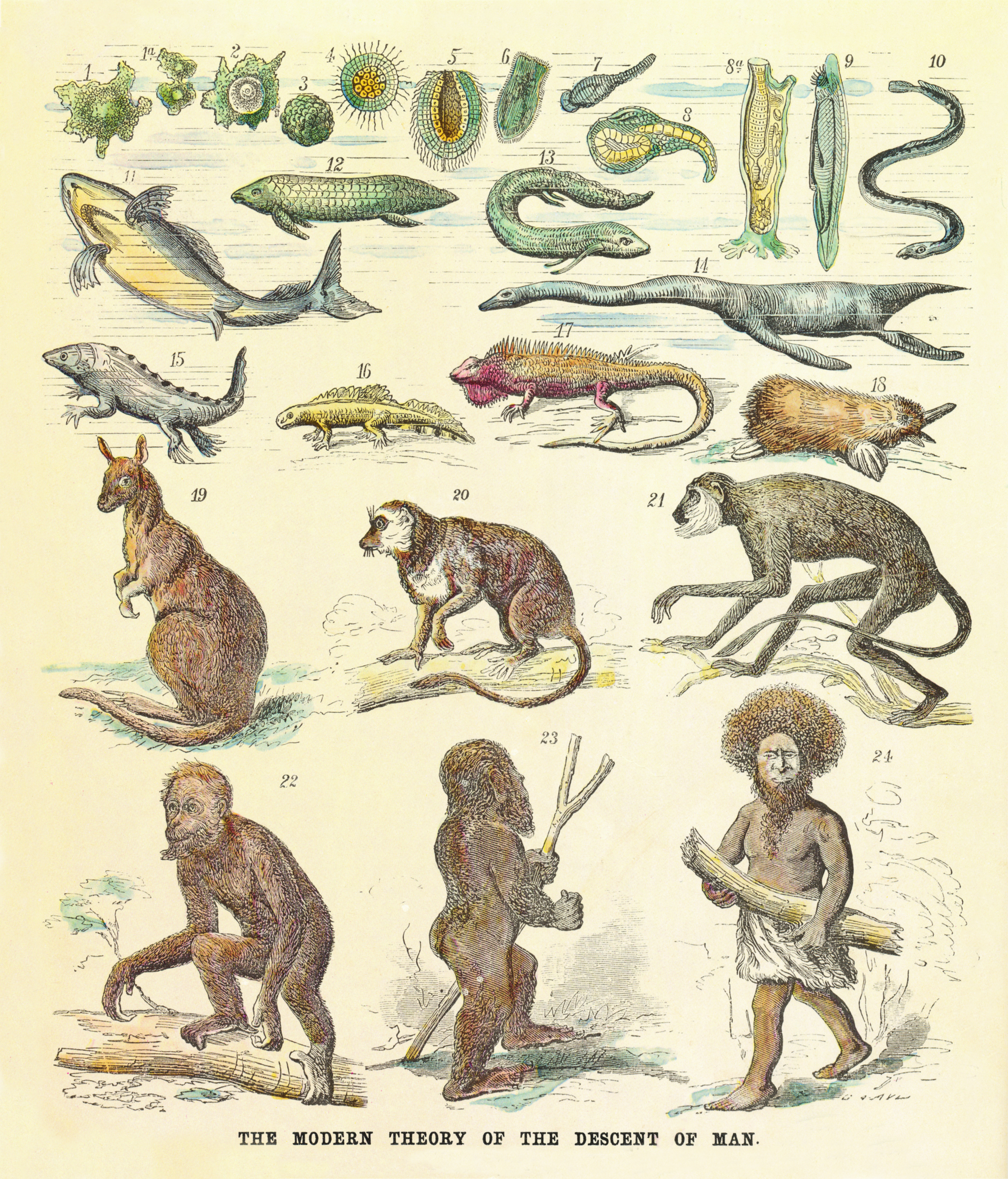
Haeckel's Chain of the Animal Ancestors of Man

Jean-Baptiste Lamarck envisioned that life is generated in the form of the simplest creatures constantly, and then strive towards complexity and perfection (i.e. humans) through a series of lower forms. In his view, lower animals were simply newcomers on the evolutionary scene. After Darwin's On the Origin of Species, the idea of "lower animals" representing earlier stages in evolution lingered, as demonstrated in Ernst Haeckel's figure of the human pedigree. While the vertebrates were then seen as forming a sort of evolutionary sequence, the various classes were distinct, the undiscovered intermediate forms being called "missing links".

Haeckel claimed that human evolution occurred in 24 stages and that the 23rd stage was a theoretical missing link he named Pithecanthropus alalus ("ape-man lacking speech"). Haeckel claimed the origin of humanity was to be found in Asia. He theorized that the missing link was to be found on the lost continent of Lemuria located in the Indian Ocean. He believed that Lemuria was the home of the first humans and that Asia was the home of many of the earliest primates; he thus supported that Asia was the cradle of hominid evolution. Haeckel argued that humans were closely related to the primates of Southeast Asia and rejected Darwin's hypothesis of human origins in Africa.

The search for a fossil that connected man and ape was unproductive until the Dutch paleontologist Eugene Dubois went to Indonesia. Between 1886 and 1895 Dubois discovered remains that he later described as "an intermediate species between humans and monkeys". He named the hominin Pithecanthropus erectus (erect ape-man), which has now been reclassified as Homo erectus. In the media, the Java Man was hailed as the missing link. For instance, the headline of the Philadelphia Inquirer on February 3, 1895, was "The Missing Link: A Dutch Surgeon in Java Unearths the Needed Specimen".

== Famous "missing links" in human evolution ==
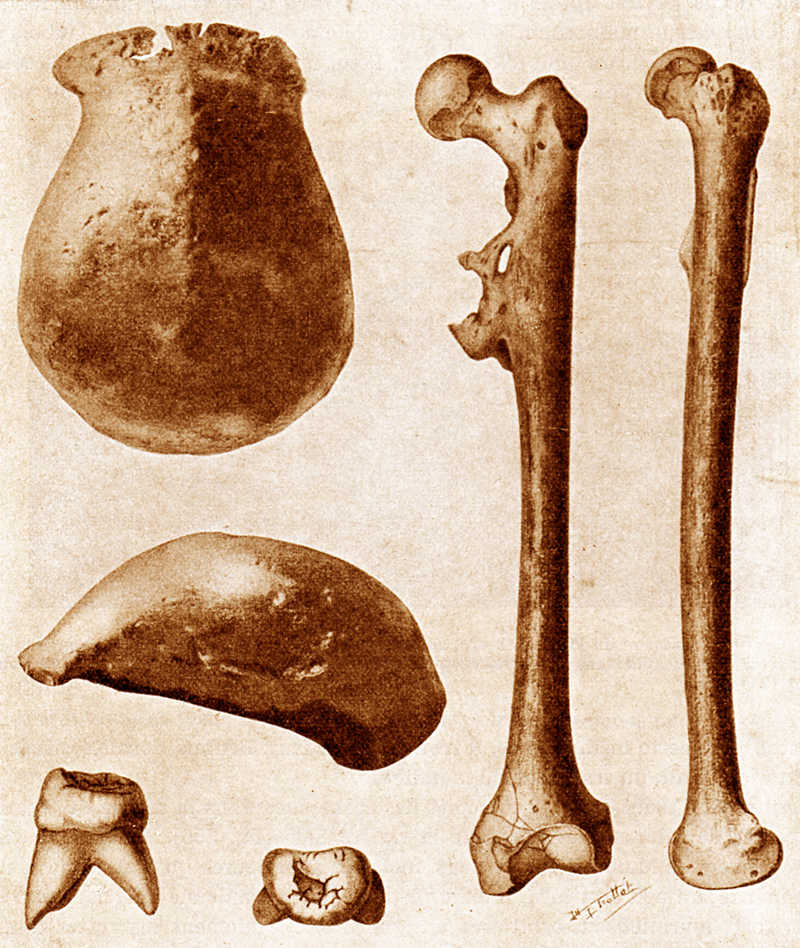
Java Man, the original "missing link" found in Java

Among the famous fossil finds credited as the "missing link" in human evolution are:

- Neanderthal (Homo neanderthalensis): A sibling human species.
- Java Man (Homo erectus): Discovered by Eugene Dubois in 1891 in Indonesia. Originally named Pithecanthropus erectus.
- Piltdown Man: A set of bones found in 1912 thought to be the "missing link" between ape and man. Eventually revealed to be a hoax.
- Nebraska Man: Originally described as an ape by Henry Fairfield Osborn in 1922, on the basis of a tooth found by rancher and geologist Harold Cook in Nebraska in 1917. Later, the original classification proved to be a mistake, and was retracted in 1927. It was never widely accepted.
- Taung Child (Australopithecus africanus): Discovered by Raymond Dart in 1924 in South Africa.
- Heidelberg Man: Probably ancestral to Homo sapiens & Homo neanderthalensis.
- Homo habilis (described in 1964) has features intermediate between Australopithecus and Homo erectus, and its classification in Homo rather than Australopithecus has been questioned.
- Lucy (Australopithecus afarensis): Discovered in 1974 by Donald Johanson in Ethiopia
- Australopithecus sediba: A series of skeletons discovered in South Africa between 2008 and 2010
