= Calaveras Skull =

1866 archaeological forgery in California

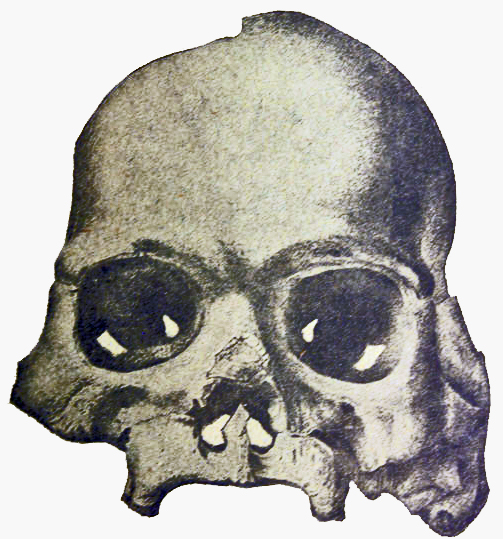
The Calaveras Skull, from William Henry Holmes' preliminary debunking of it

The Calaveras Skull (also known as the Pliocene Skull) was a human skull found in 1866 by miners in Calaveras County, California, which was presented as evidence that humans were in North America as early as during the Pliocene Epoch (at least 2 million years ago), and which was used to support the idea the humans, mastodons, and mammoths had coexisted. The skull was later revealed to be a hoax, although it is now known that humans, mastodons, and mammoths had indeed coexisted, but much more recently (during the Pleistocene Epoch: at least 12,000 years ago). Coincidentally, calaveras is the Spanish word for skulls.

== History ==
On February 25, 1866, miners claimed to have found a human skull in a mine, beneath a layer of lava, 130 feet (40 m) below the surface of the earth. The skull made it into the hands of Josiah Whitney, then the state geologist of California and professor of geology at Harvard University. A year before the skull came to his attention, Whitney published the belief that humans, mastodons, and mammoths coexisted; the skull served as proof of his convictions. After careful study, he officially announced its discovery at a meeting of the California Academy of Sciences on July 16, 1866, declaring it evidence of the existence of Pliocene-age man in North America, which would make it the oldest known record of humans on the continent.

Its authenticity was immediately challenged. In 1869 the San Francisco Evening Bulletin reported that a miner had told a minister that the skull was planted as a practical joke. Thomas Wilson of Harvard ran a fluorine analysis on it in 1879 (the first ever usage of such on human bone), with the results indicating it was of recent origin. It was so widely believed to be a hoax that Bret Harte famously wrote a satirical poem called "To the Pliocene Skull" in 1899.

Whitney did not waver in his belief that it was genuine. His successor at Harvard, Frederic Ward Putnam, also believed it to be real. By 1901 Putnam was determined to discover the truth and he headed to California. While there, he heard a story that in 1865 one of a number of Indian skulls had been dug up from a nearby burial site and planted in the mine specifically for miners to find. Putnam still declined to declare the skull a fake, instead conceding, "It may be impossible ever to determine to the satisfaction of the archaeologist the place where the skull was actually found." Others, such as adherents of Theosophy, also were unwavering in their belief in the authenticity of the skull. Further complicating the issue, careful comparison of the skull with descriptions of it at the time of its discovery revealed that the skull Whitney had in his possession was not the one originally found.

Anthropologist William Henry Holmes of the Smithsonian Institution investigated around the turn of the century. He determined that the plant and animal fossils that had been discovered near the skull were indeed genuine, but the skull was too modern, and concluded that "to suppose that man could have remained unchanged... for a million years, roughly speaking... is to suppose a miracle." Likewise, J. M. Boutwell, investigating in 1911, was told by one of the participants in the discovery that the whole thing was indeed a hoax. The miners of the Sierra Nevada apparently did not greatly like Whitney ("being an Easterner of very reserved demeanor") and were "delighted" to have played such a joke on him. Furthermore, John C. Scribner, a local shopkeeper, claimed to have planted it, and the story was revealed by his sister after his death. Radiocarbon dating in 1992 established the age of the skull at probably less than a thousand years old, placing it in the late current geological epoch age.

Despite evidence to the contrary, the Calaveras Skull continues to be cited by some creationists as proof that paleontologists ignore evidence that does not fit their theories. However, others have acknowledged that the Calaveras Skull is a hoax.

== See also ==
- Piltdown Man
