= Nitrogen dating =

Relative dating using nitrogen extraction from bones

Nitrogen dating is a form of relative dating which relies on the reliable breakdown and release of amino acids from bone samples to estimate the age of the object. For human bones, the assumption of about 5% nitrogen in the bone, mostly in the form of collagen, allows fairly consistent dating techniques.

Compared to other dating techniques, Nitrogen dating can be unreliable because leaching from bone is dependent on temperature, soil pH, ground water, and the presence of microorganism that digest nitrogen rich elements, like collagen. Some studies compare nitrogen dating results with dating results from methods like fluorine absorption dating to create more accurate estimates. Though some situations, like thin porous bones might more rapidly change the dating created by multiple methods.
