= Amédée Forestier =

Anglo-French artist and illustrator

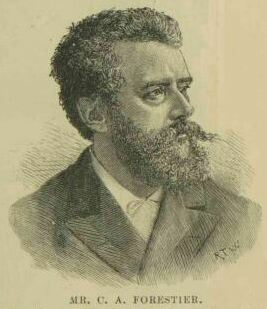
- A drawing of Forestier from The Sketch, 12 February 1896
- Born: Charles Amédée Forestier; 1854; Paris, Second French Empire
- Died: 18 November 1930 (aged 75–76); Dulwich, London, England
- Education: Beaux-Arts de Paris

Charles Amédée Forestier (1854 – 18 November 1930) was an Anglo-French artist and illustrator who specialised in historical and prehistoric scenes, and landscapes.

== Life and work ==
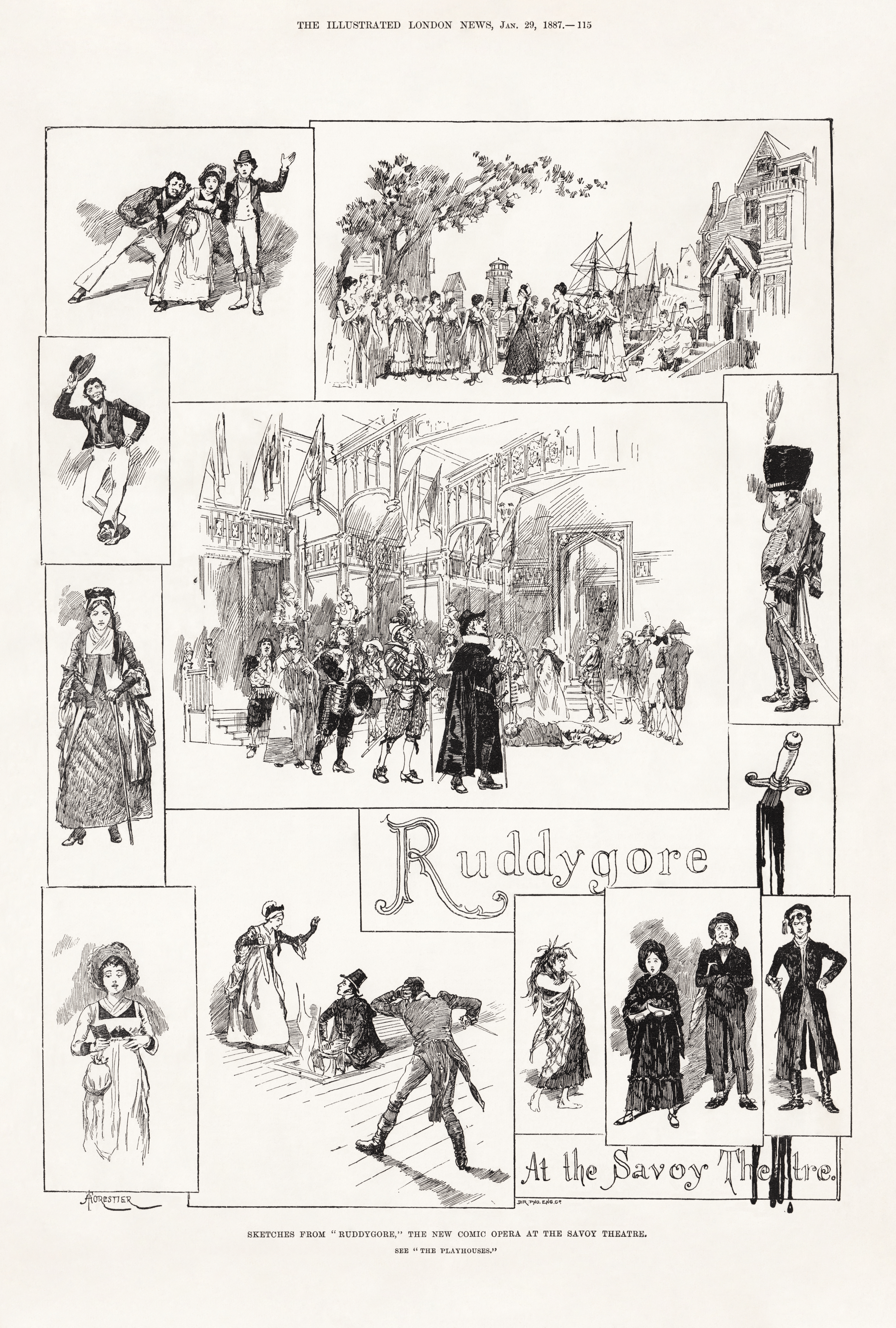
Illustration of Gilbert and Sullivan's Ruddygore for an 1887 issue of the Illustrated London News

Forestier was born in Paris, France, and studied art under Henri Lehmann at the École des Beaux-arts. In 1882 he began working for the Illustrated London News, producing illustrations for news items and fictional stories. He also produced illustrations for the Windsor Magazine, for the novels of several authors including Walter Besant, and for various travel books by A & C Black.

Forestier became known for his historical illustrations, especially his carefully researched drawings of archaeological finds such as prehistoric man. His drawings are notable for their attention to detail, a consequence of the need to convey a lot of visual information, with little accompanying text, in the popular illustrated magazines of the day.

In December 1911, a series of his drawings (accompanying text by Arthur Bulleid) was published in the Illustrated London News, depicting scenes of everyday life in an Iron Age village near present-day Glastonbury – "Glastonbury Lake Village". These scenes were widely reproduced and seen as influential in shaping public perceptions of prehistory at the time.

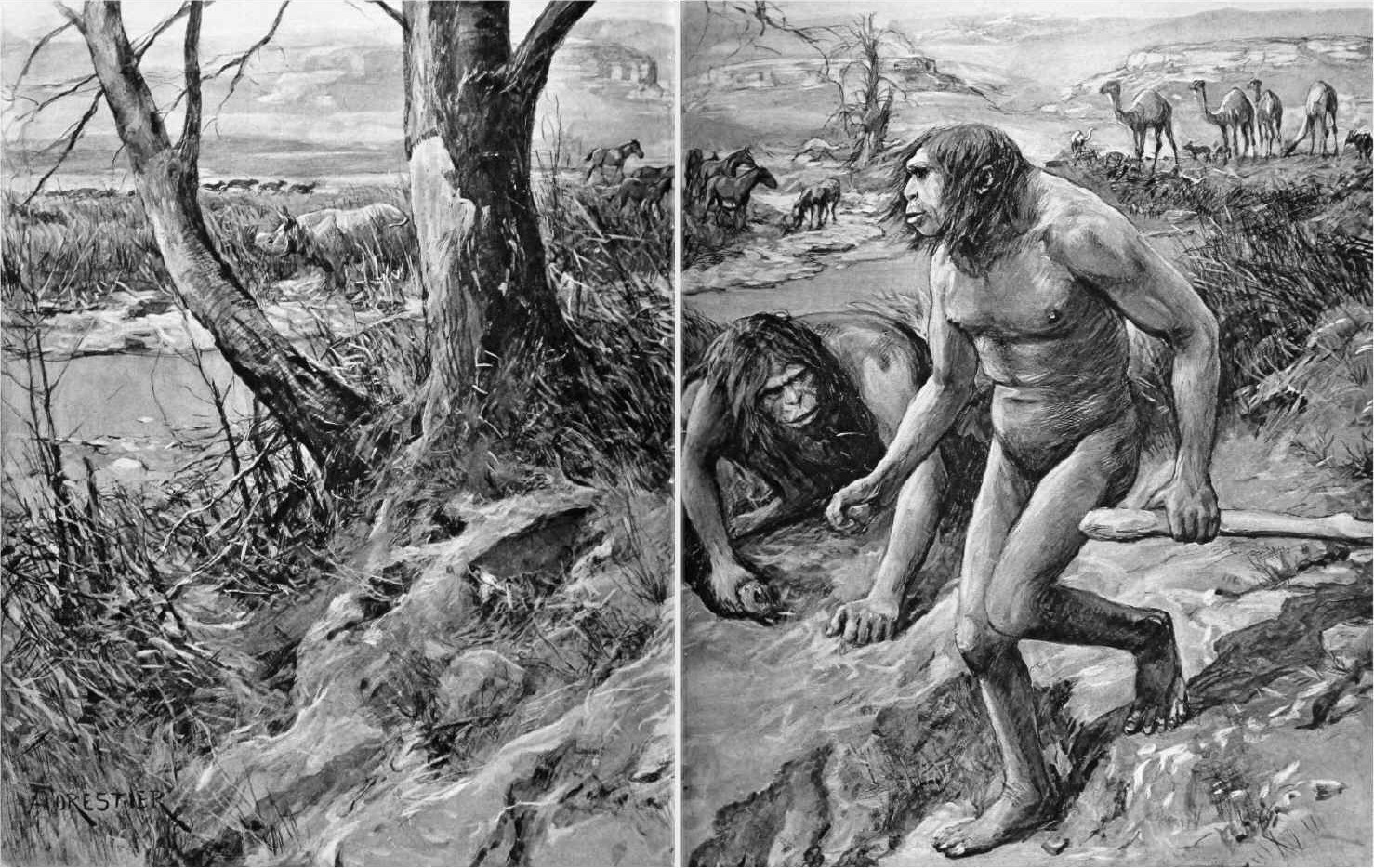
Nebraska Man (1922)

Forestier also worked for the Royal Ontario Museum and the London Museum, producing illustrations of Roman Life, and later had an illustrated book published on the subject – The Roman Soldier (A & C Black, 1928).

In 1922 his "Nebraska Man" drawings appeared in the Illustrated London News. These reconstructions, in collaboration with scientist Grafton Elliot Smith, were of a possible ape-like ancestor of present-day man, based on a fossil tooth found in Nebraska. However this drawing owed more to artistic imagination than scientific fact, and the find itself was scientifically insignificant, since the tooth was actually that of a peccary.

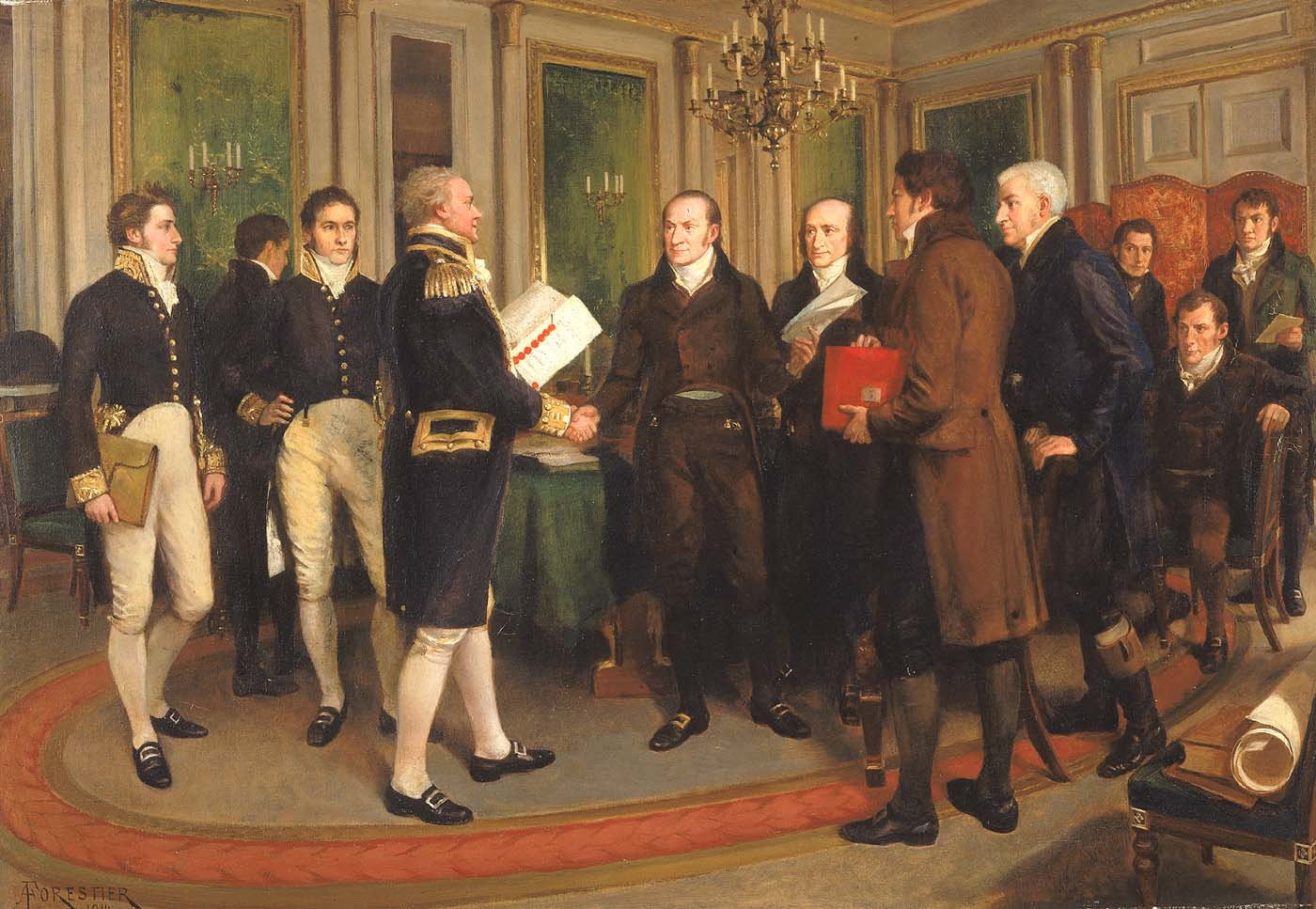
The Signing of the Treaty of Ghent, Christmas Eve, 1814 (1914)

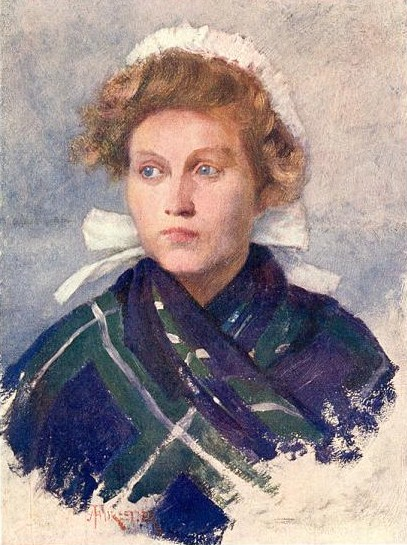
A Young Flemish woman (from Bruges and West Flanders)

Apart from his drawing, Forestier also painted in oils and watercolour. In 1914, he painted a depiction of the signing of the Treaty of Ghent, which was given to the American government in 1922 by Barron Collier and the Sulgrave Institution. He died in Dulwich, London, on 18 November 1930.

== Books (selected) ==
=== Illustrated by Forestier ===
- Besant, Walter. The World Went Very Well Then: Volume 1, Volume 2, Volume 3 (London: Chatto & Windus, 1887)
- Cobb, James Francis (adp. from Hendrik Conscience). Off to California: a tale of the gold country (London: Wells Gardner, Darton, & Co., 1887)
- Collins, Wilkie. Blind Love (London: Chatto & Windus, 1890)
- Stockton, Frank R. Mrs Cliff's Yacht (Charles Scribner's sons, 1896)
- Moore, Frank F. The Jessamy Bride (Hutchinson, 1897)
- Pain, Barry E. O. The Romantic History of Robin Hood (Harper, 1898)
- Drummond, Hamilton. The Seven Houses: a romance (New York: F.A. Stokes, 1901) – frontispiece
- Pemberton, Sir Max. I Crown Thee a King: a romance (Methuen & Co., 1902)
- Omond, George W. T. Bruges and West Flanders (A & C Black, 1906)
- Omond, George W. T. Belgium (A & C Black, 1908)
- Omond, George W. T. Liége and the Ardennes (A & C Black, 1908)
- Omond, George W. T. Belgium (Peeps at many lands) (A & C Black, 1909)
- Ambler, Benjamin George. Alfred, Lord Tennyson: his homes and haunts (T.C. & E.C. Jack, 1911)
- Bensusan, Samuel Levy. William Shakespeare, his homes and haunts (Dodge, 1912)
- Bensusan, Samuel Levy. William Wordsworth, his homes and haunts (Dodge, 1912)
- Baddeley, John F. Russia, Mongolia, China .... (Macmillan and Company, 1919)

=== Written and illustrated by Forestier ===
- The Roman Soldier: some illustrations representative of Roman military life with special reference to Britain (A & C Black, 1928)
