= Taung Child =

Hominin fossil

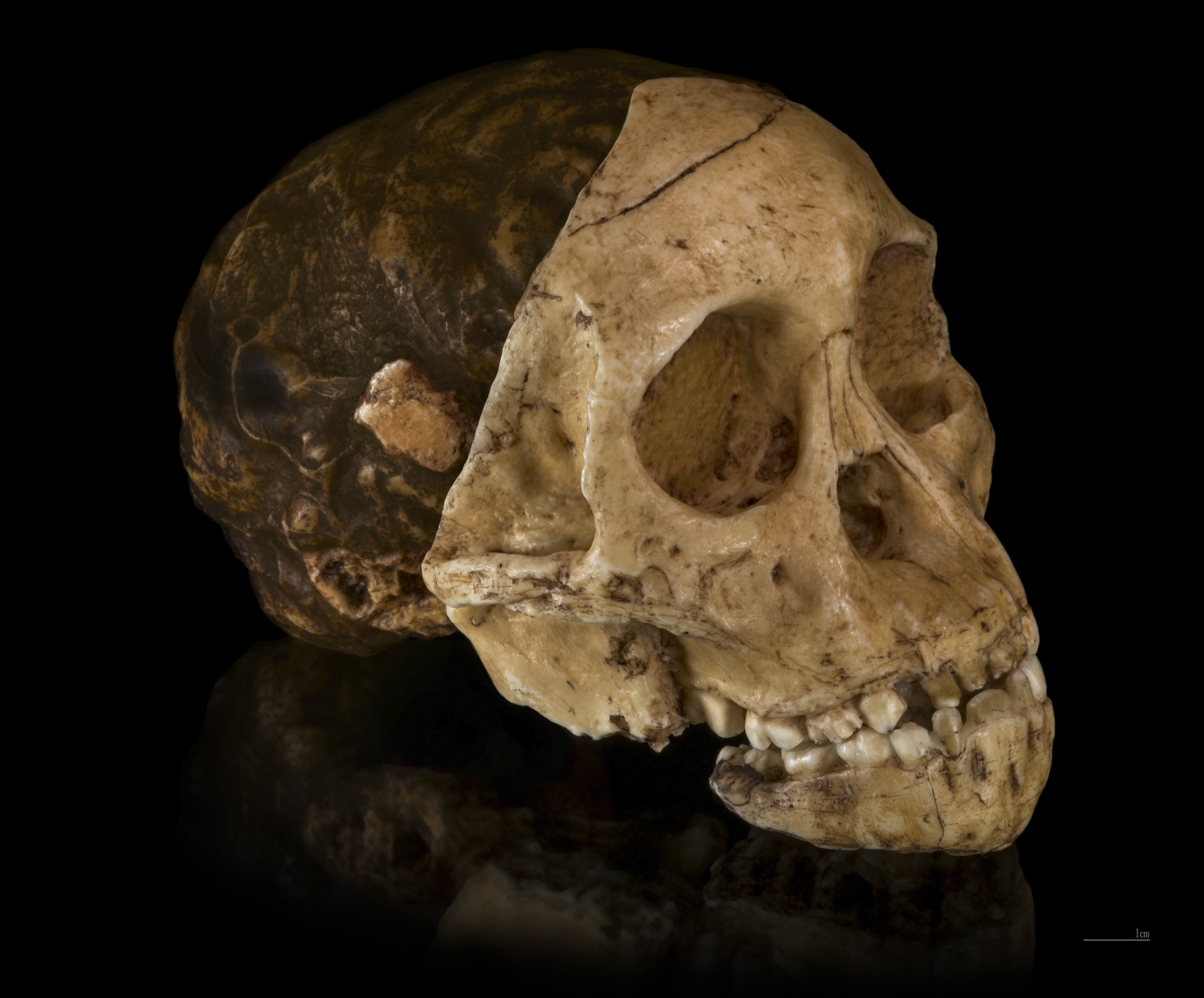
- Catalog no.: Taung 1
- Common name: Taung Child
- Species: Australopithecus africanus
- Age: 2.8 million years (aged 3 years)
- Place discovered: Taung, North West province, South Africa
- Date discovered: 1924

The Taung Child (or Taung Baby) is the fossilised skull of a young Australopithecus africanus. It was discovered in Taung, South Africa in 1924 and described as a new species and genus by Raymond Dart in 1925. The skull was one of the first early hominin fossils to be found in Africa, and the first evidence that humanity originated from the continent.

The Taung skull is in repository at the University of the Witwatersrand. Dean Falk, a specialist in brain evolution, has called it "the most important anthropological fossil of the twentieth century." It revealed the existence of a group of hominins that were bipedal but had brains no larger than those of chimpanzees.

== Description ==
Dart initially identified three major traits which suggested that the fossil was ancestral to Humans. The brain structure was more human. The foramen magnum was in a forward position, indicating bipedality. The canines were reduced.

The Taung Child was originally thought to have been about six years old at death because of the presence of deciduous teeth, but is now believed to have been about three or four, based on studies of rates of enamel deposition on the teeth. Many scientists debated the Taung Child's age, as it was unclear if it grew at the speed of a human, or of an ape. Compared to an ape, it would have been aged about 4 years, and compared to a human, it would have been aged around 5–7 years old. The skull has a cranial capacity of 400–500 cc, which is comparable to that of a modern adult chimpanzee. Because mature brain size is attained within the first few years of life, the relatively small size is unlikely to be attributed to the specimen being a juvenile. The skull also possesses features more commonly found in humans than apes, including a rising forehead and round eye sockets. Although the lower portion of the nose resembles a chimpanzee, the overall shorter shape is human-like. Likewise, the lower portion of the face is protruded, though to a lesser degree than in modern apes. A bony shelf found within the inner jaw of apes could not be found. Dart opted to describe the remains as a "man-ape" rather than as an "ape-man" to highlight the more human features present compared to the remains found of the more recent Pithecanthropus erectus.

In 2006, Lee Berger suggested the Taung Child probably was killed by an giant eagle or other large predatory bird, citing the similarity of the damage to the skull and eye sockets of the Taung Child to that seen in modern primates that are known to have been killed by eagles. There are talon marks in the eyes as well as a depression along the skull that is common in creatures that have been preyed upon by eagles.

== History ==
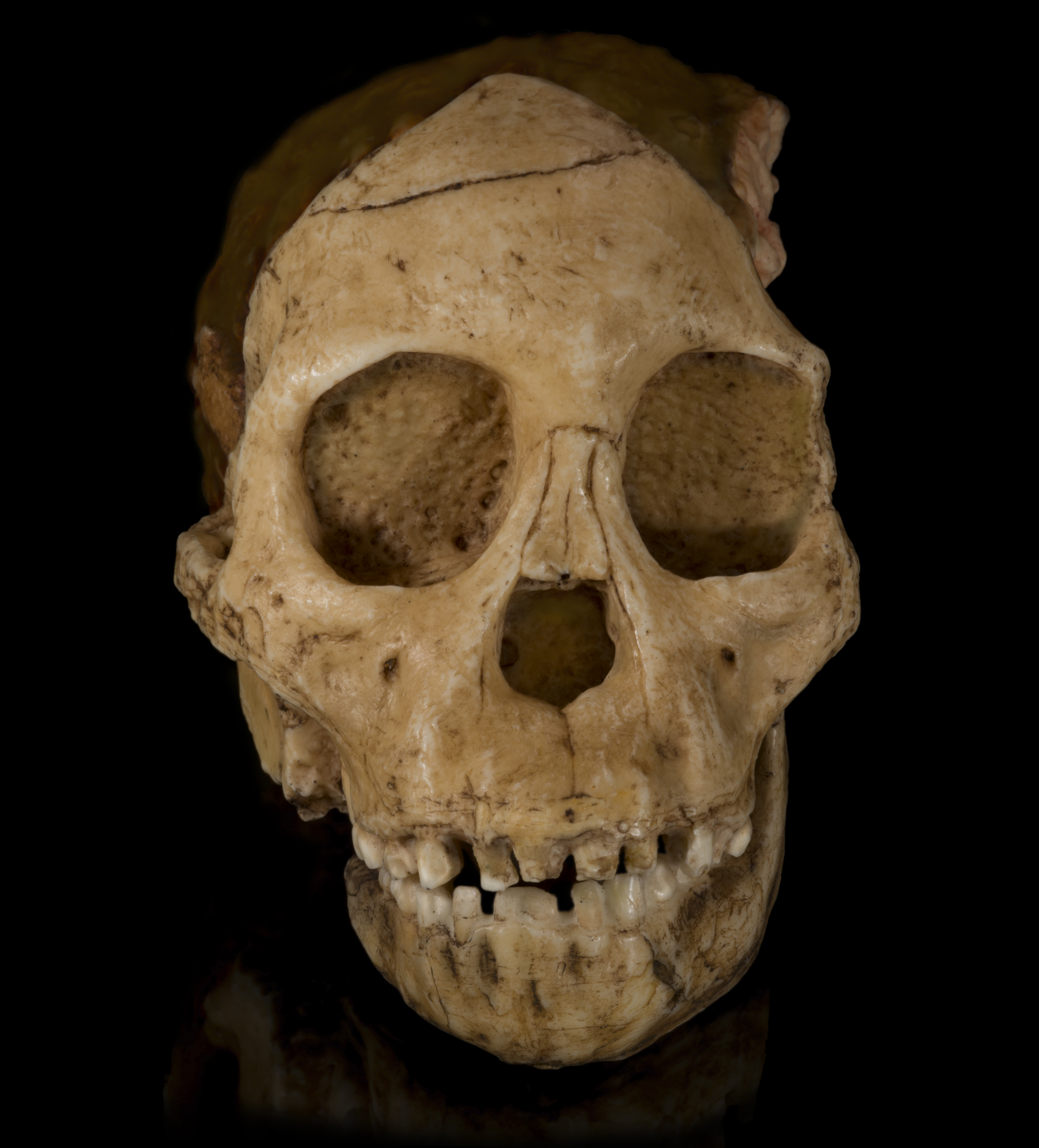
Taung-1 front

=== Background ===
In the early 20th century, the workers at limestone quarries in Southern Africa routinely uncovered fossils from the tufa formations that they mined. The tufa did not form consistently, and over time cavities were left open and they became beneficial areas for animals to take shelter in. As a result, many bones began to build up in these areas. These areas were mostly sandstone, and they stood in the way of successful mining. So, miners would use explosives to clear these areas, and discard all the debris. However, many fossils began to show up, and these were saved by many of the miners. Many were of an extinct fauna, which included baboons and other primates, and the more complete or somehow more interesting fossils were kept as curiosities by the Europeans who managed operations.

=== Discovery ===
In 1924, workers at the Buxton Limeworks in Taung, showed a fossilized primate skull to Edwin Gilbert Izod, the visiting director of the Northern Lime Company, the managing company of the quarry. The director gave it to his son, Pat Izod, who displayed it on the mantle over the fireplace. When Josephine Salmons, a friend of the Izod family, paid a visit to Pat's home, she noticed the primate skull, identified it as from an extinct monkey and realising its possible significance mentioned it to her mentor, Raymond Dart.

Salmons was the first female student of Dart, an anatomist at the University of Witwatersrand. Salmons was permitted to take the fossilized skull and presented it to Dart, who also recognized it as a significant find. Dart asked the company to send any more interesting fossilized skulls that were unearthed. When a consulting geologist, Robert Young, paid a visit to the quarry office, the director, A. E. Spiers, presented him with a collection of fossilised primate skulls that had been gathered by a miner, Mr. De Bruyn. A. E. Spiers was using a particular fossil as a paperweight, and Young asked him for this as well. Young sent some of the skulls back to Dart. When Dart examined the contents of the crate, he found a fossilized endocast of a skull showing the impression of a complex brain. He quickly searched through the rest of the fossils in the crates, and matched it to a fossilized skull of a juvenile primate, which had a shallow face and fairly small teeth.

Only forty days after he first saw the fossil, Dart completed a paper that named the species of Australopithecus africanus, the "southern ape from Africa", and described it as "an extinct race of apes intermediate between living anthropoids and man". The paper appeared in the 7 February 1925 issue of the journal Nature. The fossil was soon nicknamed the Taung Child. It is the holotype of Australopithecus africanus with the accession number Taung 1.

== Initial criticism of Dart's claims ==
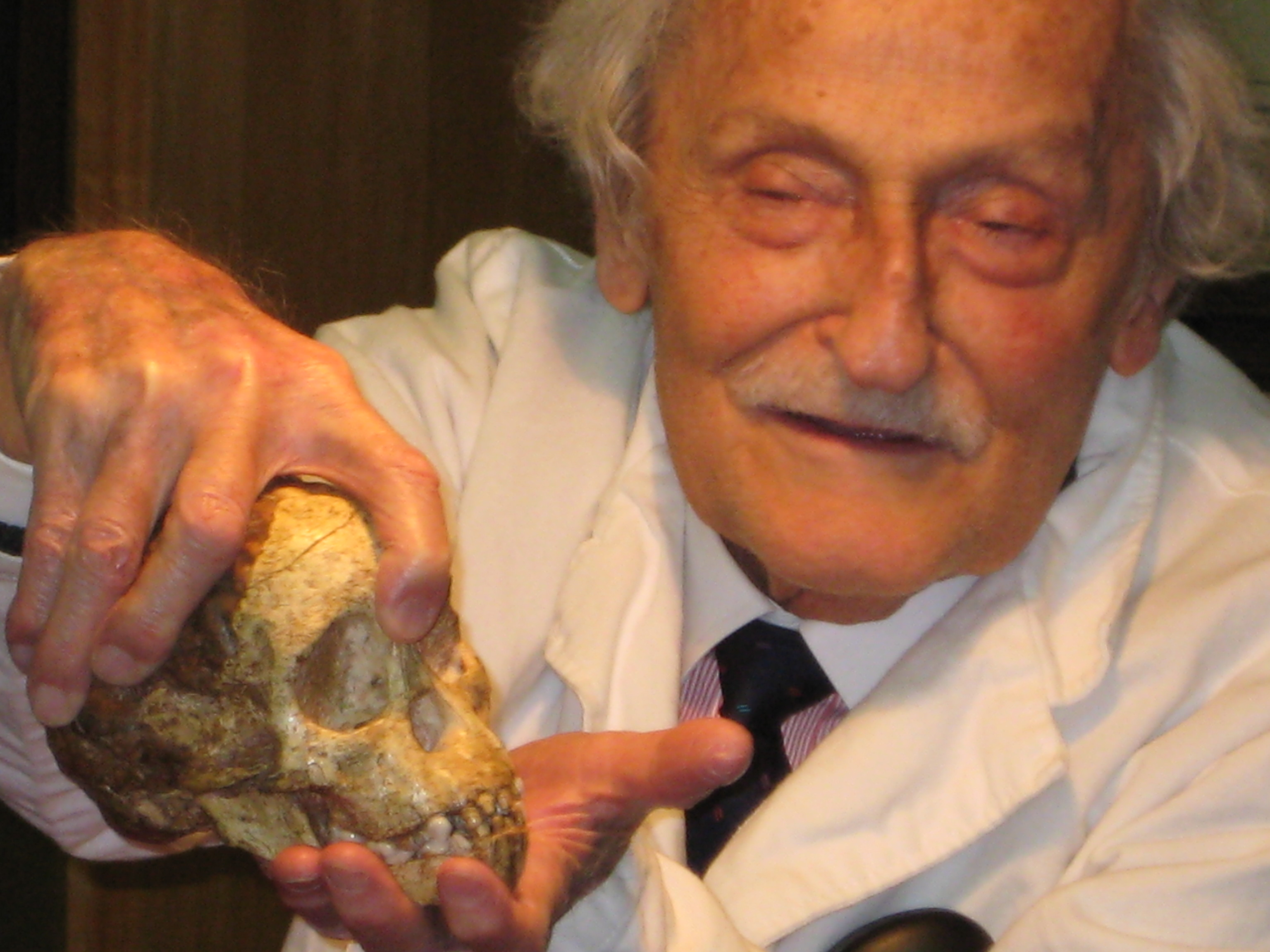
Phillip Tobias and the Taung Child

=== Reception ===
Scientists were initially reluctant to accept that the Taung Child and the new genus Australopithecus were ancestral to modern humans. In the issue of Nature immediately following the one in which Dart's paper was published, several authorities in British paleoanthropology criticized Dart's conclusion. Three of the four scholars were members of the Piltdown Man committee: Sir Arthur Keith, Grafton Elliot Smith, and Sir Arthur Smith Woodward. They were much more skeptical about this fossil's place in evolutionary history, and believed it deserved to be categorized as a chimp or gorilla rather than a human ancestor. However, Dart still had the hesitant support of W.L.H. Duckworth, but he still asked for more information on the brain to support this claim.

Dart's former mentor, Keith, one of the most prominent anatomists of his time, claimed that there was insufficient evidence to accept Dart's claim that Australopithecus was transitional between apes and humans. Grafton Elliot Smith stated that he needed more evidence and a larger picture of the skull before he could judge the significance of the new fossil. Arthur Smith Woodward dismissed the Taung Child as having "little bearing" on the issue of "whether the direct ancestors of man are to be sought in Asia or Africa".

The critiques became more fervent a few months later. Elliot Smith concluded that the Taung fossil was "essentially identical" to the skull of "the infant gorilla and chimpanzee". Infant apes appear more human like because of the "shape of their forehead and the lack of fully developed brow ridges". Addressing the claim that the fossil was "the missing link between ape and human", Keith stated in a letter to Nature that

an examination of the casts... will satisfy geologists that this claim is preposterous. The skull is that of a young anthropoid ape... and showing so many points of affinity with the two living African anthropoids, the gorilla and chimpanzee, that there cannot be a moment's hesitation in placing the fossil form in this living group.

In 1926, a year after the publication of Dart's article, Aleš Hrdlička reviewed and approved German and Portuguese articles for the American Journal of Physical Anthropology. Both articles asserted that the Taung Child should not be placed within the human phylum due to a lack of evidence for the classification. The next year, Hrdlička personally commented on another of Dart's articles, this time in Natural History, saying that the author "very ingeniously, but, it seems obvious, more or less artificially, endeavors to humanize the 'Australopithecus'. It is not known that this effort thus far has found favor with any other student who gave truly earnest and critical attention to the otherwise very interesting and important Taung relic."

Far from the bones being objective facts to be judged as evidence, there was an established pattern of belief. There was a climate of opinion that favored discoveries made in Asia but not the "silly notion" of small-brained bipeds from Africa.

— Sherwood Washburn, "Human Evolution After Raymond Dart" (1985)

=== Reasons for dissent ===
There were several reasons that it took decades for the field to accept Dart's claim that Australopithecus africanus was in the human line of descent. First and foremost was that the British scientific establishment had been fooled by the hoax of the Piltdown Man, which had a large brain and ape-like teeth. Expecting human ancestors to have evolved a large brain very early, they found that the Taung Child's small brain and human-like teeth made it an unlikely ancestor to modern humans.

Secondly, until the 1940s, most anthropologists believed that humans had evolved in Asia, not in Africa.

A third reason is that, despite accepting that modern humans had emerged by evolution, many anthropologists believed that the genus Homo had split from the great apes during the Oligocene (now known to have been as long as 30 million years ago) and so felt uneasy about accepting that humans had a small-brained, ape-like ancestor, like Australopithecus africanus, dating from the Pleistocene (later to be established at only 2 million years ago).

Lastly, many people disputed the role of this fossil because of its presumed conflict with religious teachings. When Taung was first announced in February 1925, many who did not believe the theory of evolution was scientifically backed up began to rise up in protest of this fossil. Dart began receiving threats from members of various religious communities that proclaimed his ideas blasphemous. Some were able to reconcile the science with the religious theology through the lens of "creation science", but there was still significant opposition. However, by this time, a couple other fossils such as Java Man, Neanderthal Man, and Rhodesian Man had been discovered, further supporting the theory of evolution.

Solly Zuckerman, who had studied anatomy under Dart in South Africa, concluded as early as 1928 that Australopithecus was little more than an ape. He and a four-member team carried out further studies of the australopithecine family in the 1940s and 1950s. Using a "metrical and statistical approach" that he thought was superior to purely descriptive methods, he decided that the creatures had not walked on two legs and so were not an intermediate form between humans and apes. For the rest of his life, Zuckerman continued to conclude that Australopithecus was not part of the human family tree, even though that was the conclusion that had become "universally accepted" by many scientists.

== Acceptance ==
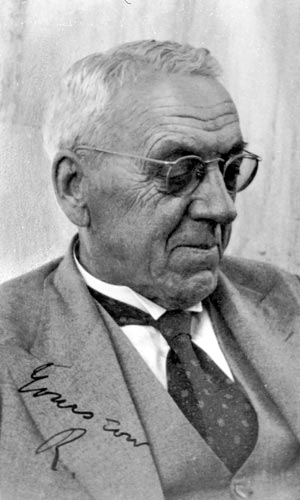
Robert Broom, a Scottish doctor who became a professional paleontologist in 1933 at 67, was a longtime supporter of Dart. Broom discovered fossils of Australopithecus that contributed to the acceptance of Dart's interpretation of the Taung child, as a transitional form between apes and anatomically modern humans.

Dart's claim that Australopithecus africanus, the species name that he had given to the Taung Child, was a transitional form between apes and humans was almost universally rejected. Robert Broom, a Scottish doctor who worked in South Africa, was one of the few scientists to believe Dart. Two weeks after Dart announced the discovery of the Taung Child in Nature, Broom visited Dart in Johannesburg to see the fossil. After he became a paleontologist in 1933, Broom found adult fossils of Australopithecus africanus and discovered more robust fossils, which were named Paranthropus robustus (also known as Australopithecus robustus). Even after Dart chose to take a break from his work in anthropology, Broom undertook more excavations, and slowly began to find more specimens that caused scientists to conclude that Dart must have been correct in his analysis of the Taung Child; it did have human-like features. In 1946, Broom and his colleague Gerrit Schepers published a volume consolidating all the information they had found about Australopithecus africanus in a volume titled The South African Fossil Men: The Australopithecinae.

In the late 1920s, American paleontologist William Gregory also believed that Australopithecus was part of the human family tree. Employed by the American Museum of Natural History in New York, Gregory supported Charles Darwin and Thomas Henry Huxley's then-unpopular theory that humans were closely related to African apes. The director of the museum, however, was Henry Fairfield Osborn; despite being "the chief public defender of evolution in the United States" at the time of the Scopes Trial in 1925, he disagreed with Darwin's views on the origins of humanity. Gregory and Osborn repeatedly debated the issue in public forums, but Osborn's view that humans had evolved from early ancestors who did not look like apes prevailed among American anthropologists in the 1930s and 1940s. In 1938, Gregory visited South Africa and saw the Taung Child and the fossils that Broom had recently discovered. More convinced than ever that Dart and Broom were right, he called Australopithecus africanus "the missing link no longer missing".

The turning point in the acceptance of Dart's analysis of the Taung Child came in 1947, when the prominent British anthropologist Wilfrid Le Gros Clark announced that he believed it. Le Gros Clark, who would also play an important role in exposing the fraud of the Piltdown Man in 1953, visited Johannesburg in late 1946 to study Dart's Taung skull and Broom's adult fossils, with the intention of proving that they were only apes. After two weeks of studies and visiting the caves in which Broom had found his fossils (the Taung cave had been destroyed by miners soon after the discovery of the Taung skull), however, Clark became convinced that these fossils were hominids rather than pongids.

In 1947, Keith published in Nature, announcing his support of Dart and Broom's research. He stated "the evidence submitted by Dr. Robert Broom and Professor Dart was right and I was wrong", agreeing that with the new popular opinion that claimed that this fossil was human-like in posture, dental elements, and thus must have had a bipedal walk.

In early January 1947, at the First Pan-African Congress on Prehistory, Le Gros Clark was the first anthropologist of such stature to call the Taung Child a "hominid": an early human. An anonymous article, published in Nature on 15 February 1947, announced Clark's conclusions to a wider public. On that day, Keith, who had been one of Dart's most virulent critics, composed a letter to the editor of Nature announcing that he supported Clark's analysis: "I was one of those who took the point of view that when the adult form [of Australopithecus] was discovered it would prove to be near akin to the living African anthropoids—the gorilla and the chimpanzee. I am now convinced... that Prof. Dart was right and that I was wrong. The Australopithecinae are in or near the line which culminated in the human form". As Roger Lewin put it in his book Bones of Contention, "a prompter and more thorough capitulation could hardly be imagined".

== Identification ==
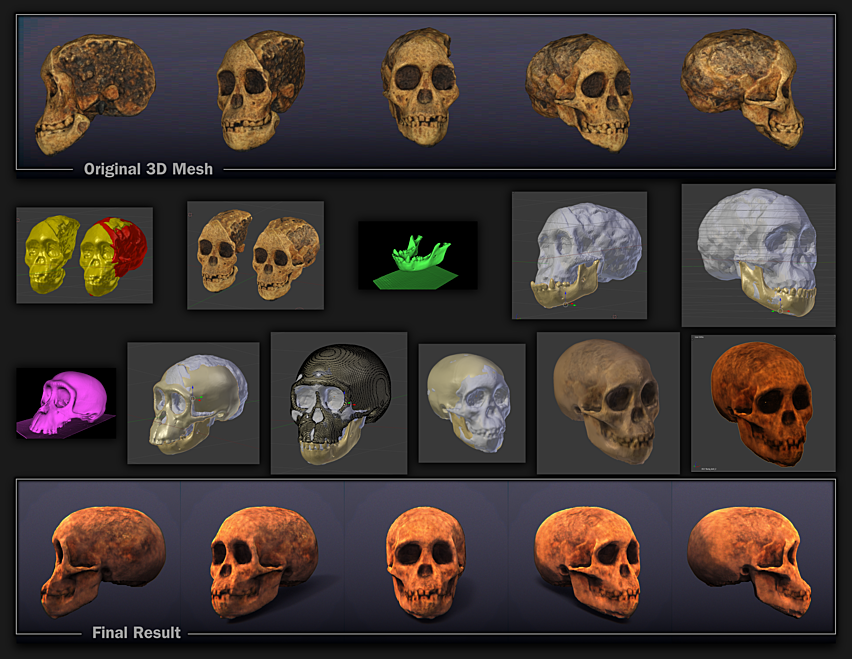
Recovering the missing parts of skull by Arc-Team, Antrocon NPO, Cicero Moraes, University of Padua

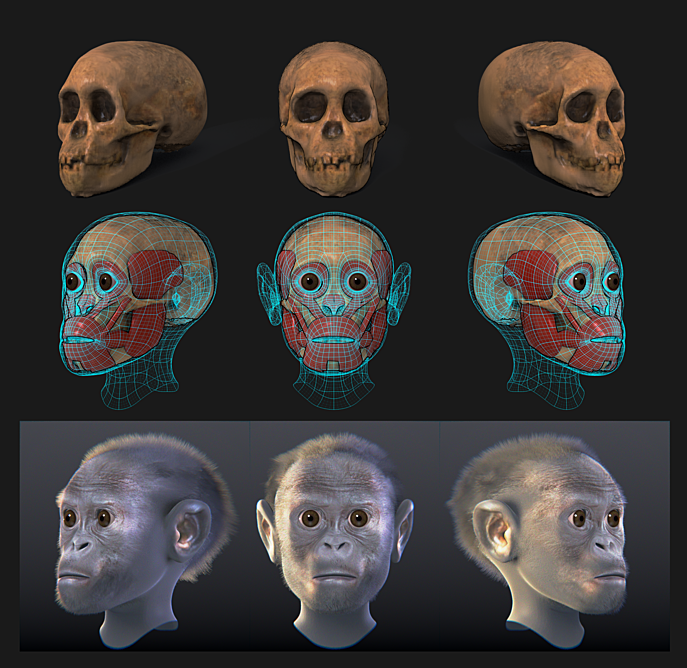
Facial forensic reconstruction by Arc-Team, Antrocon NPO, Cicero Moraes, University of Padua

Dart drew conclusions that were unavoidably controversial due to an ambiguity of the fossil evidence. The idea that the skull belonged to a new genus was suggested by comparison with skulls of chimpanzees. Its skull was slightly larger than an equally old chimpanzee's. The forehead of the chimpanzee receded to form a heavy browridge and a jutting jaw; the Taung Child's forehead also recedes but leaves no browridge. Its foramen magnum, an opening in the cranium, where the spinal cord is continuous with the brain, is beneath the cranium so the creature may have stood upright. This suggests bipedal locomotion.

Dean Falk, a specialist in neuroanatomy, stated that Dart had not fully considered certain apelike attributes for Taung.

In his 1925 article, Dart had claimed that the brain of Taung was humanlike. As it turned out, he was wrong about that.... Taung's humanlike features were overemphasized.

This mainly pertains to the lunate sulcus, which Dart had described as having human-like placement. Upon further examination however, Falk determined that these patterns were much more similar to that of an ape's similar sized brain. This however was of great debate, as the sulcus was not clearly visible on the endocast, as it often is not in apes. Ralph Holloway stood in opposition of this idea, as he had long been known as a supporter of Dart's analysis of Taung. He believed that the sulcus would be in the area of the lambdoid structure. Falk however, believed the sulcus was placed higher on the skull, in a more ape-like manner. However, studies surrounding this have been controversial, as there is no concrete place on the brain where they can place these features. Paleoneurologists have been tasked with looking at various depressions in the brain and attempting to determine what they are. These scientists are often met with skepticism, just as Falk in her continued support of an ape-like placement of the lunate sulcus. However, now many professionals believe that the sulcus is not visible in Taung and many other Australopithecus africanus specimens. However, a newer endocast specimen with number Stw 505 has been examined, and many believe that it supports Dart's hypothesis, but this aspect of Taung is still highly debated, and many still believe it has ape-like placement.

Subsequently, Falk unearthed an unpublished manuscript that Dart completed in 1929 in the archives of the University of Witwatersrand, which provides a much more thorough description and analysis of the Taung endocast than Dart's earlier announcement in Nature. This was barred from being published, to Dart's dismay in 1931. It remains unpublished in these archives. In this writing, Falk discovered that she and Dart had come to similar conclusions surrounding the theorized evolutionary process of the brain that Taung indicates. Whereas Dart had identified only two potential sulci on the Taung endocast in 1925, he identified and illustrated 14 additional sulci in this still-unpublished monograph. There, too, Dart detailed how Taung's endocast was expanded globally in three different regions, contrary to the suggestion that he believed hominin brains evolved back-end-first, in a so-called mosaic fashion. This goes against Holloway's interpretation as he has indicated that the back area of the brain evolved before other regions of the brain, but it stands in agreement with Falk's belief that the brain evolved equally in a coordinated fashion instead.

Using a biochronological approach examining the ratios of dimensions of lower first molar teeth, the date for the Taung Child can be placed around 2.58 million years, coincidentally at the boundary between the Pliocene and the Pleistocene.

== See also ==
- Selam (Australopithecus)
- List of human evolution fossils
- List of fossil sites

== Works cited ==
- Brain, C.K. (2003), "Raymond Dart and our African Origins", in Laura Garwin; Tim Lincoln (eds.), A Century of Nature: Twenty-One Discoveries that Changed Science and the World, University of Chicago Press, pp. 3–9, ISBN 978-0-226-28413-2. ISBN 0-226-28415-8 (paperback).
- Conroy, G. C.; Falk, D.; Guyer, J.; Weber, G.W.; Seidler, H.; Recheis, W. (2000), "Endocranial capacity in Sts 71 (Australopithecus africanus) by three-dimensional computed tomography", Anat. Rec., 258 (4): 391–396, doi:10.1002/(sici)1097-0185(20000401)258:4<391::aid-ar7>3.0.co;2-r, PMID 10737857.
- Dart, Raymond A. (1925), "Australopithecus africanus: The Man-Ape of South Africa", Nature, 115 (2884): 195–199, Bibcode:1925Natur.115..195D, doi:10.1038/115195a0.
- ——— (1929), Australopithecus africanus: And His Place in Human Nature, Unpublished manuscript in the University of Witwatersrand archives.
- Fagan, Brian, ed. (1996), Eyewitness to Discovery: First-Person Accounts of More Than Fifty of the World's Greatest Archaeological Discoveries, Oxford University Press, USA, ISBN 978-0-195-12651-8.
- Falk, Dean (2004), Braindance: New Discoveries about Human Origins and Brain Evolution (Revised and expanded ed.), New York: Henry Holt and Company, ISBN 978-0-813-02738-8.
- ——— (2009), "The natural endocast of Taung (Australopithecus africanus): Insights from the unpublished papers of Raymond Arthur Dart", Yearbook of Physical Anthropology, 52: 49–65, doi:10.1002/ajpa.21184, PMID 19890860.
- ——— (2011), The Fossil Chronicles: How Two Controversial Discoveries Changed our View of Human Evolution, Berkeley and Los Angeles: University of California Press, ISBN 978-0-520-26670-4.
- ——— (2014), "Interpreting sulci on hominin endocasts: Old hypotheses and new findings", Frontiers in Human Neuroscience, 8 (Article 134): 1–11, doi:10.3389/fnhum.2014.00134, PMC 4013485, PMID 24822043.
- Johanson, Donald; Shreeve, James (1989), Lucy's Child, New York: William Morrow and Co, ISBN 978-0-688-06492-1.
- Lewin, Roger (1997). Bones of Contention: Controversies in the Search for Human Origins (2nd ed.). Chicago: University of Chicago Press. ISBN 978-0-226-47651-3. OCLC 36181117.
- McKee, Jeffrey K. (2000), The Riddled Chain: Chance, Coincidence, and Chaos in Human Evolution, New Brunswick, NJ: Rutgers University Press, ISBN 978-0-813-52783-3.
- Reader, John (1981), Missing Links: The Hunt for Earliest Man, London: Book Club Associates/William Collins, ISBN 978-0-316-73590-2.
- Reed, Charles (1983), "A Short History of the Discovery and Early Study of the Australopithecines", in Kathleen J. Reichs (ed.), Hominid Origins: Inquiries Past and Present, Lanham, MD: University Press of America, pp. 1–77, ISBN 978-0-819-12864-5. ISBN 0-819-12865-1.
- Štrkalj, Goran; Kaszycka, Katarzyna (2012). "Shedding new light on an old mystery: Early photographs of the Taung Child". South African Journal of Science. 108 (11–12): 1–4. doi:10.4102/sajs.v108i11/12.1224.
- Tobias, Phillip; Howells, William (1985). "Taung: A Mirror for American Anthropology". In Phillip V. Tobias (ed.). Hominid Evolution: Past, Present, and Future. New York: Alan Liss. pp. 19–20. ISBN 978-0471847571.
- Washburn, Sherwood (1985). "Human Evolution After Raymond Dart". In Phillip V. Tobias (ed.). Hominid Evolution: Past, Present, and Future. New York: Alan Liss. pp. 3–18. ISBN 978-0471847571.
- Zuckerman, Solly (1970). Beyond the Ivory Tower: The Frontiers of Public and Private Science. London: Weidenfeld & Nicolson. ISBN 978-0-297-00236-9.
