= Fluorine absorption dating =

Dating method

Fluorine absorption dating is a method used to determine the amount of time an object has been underground.

Fluorine absorption dating is based on the fact that groundwater contains fluoride ions. Items such as bone that are buried in soil will absorb fluoride from the groundwater over time. From the amount of absorbed fluoride in the item, the amount of time that the item has been buried can be estimated. However, since different sites have different levels of fluorine in the groundwater, fluorine absorption dating can only be used to determine the relative age of bones from the same site. It cannot give how old a bone actually is, only whether it is younger, older, or the same age as other bones from the same site.

Many instances of this dating method compare the amount of fluorine and uranium in the bones to results from nitrogen dating, allowing more accurate estimations of date. Older bones have more fluorine and uranium, with less nitrogen. Because decomposition happens at different speeds in different places, it is not possible to compare bones from different sites.

As not all objects absorb fluorine at the same rate, the accuracy of fluorine dating is somewhat limited. Although this can be compensated for by including the estimated rate of absorption in calculations, such accommodations tend to have a rather large margin of error.

In 1953, this test was used by Kenneth Oakley to easily identify that the 'Piltdown Man' was forged, almost 50 years after it was originally 'unearthed'. It was also used to disprove the validity of the Calaveras Skull, the first use of fluorine dating on human bone.
