= Joseph Weiner =

Joseph Sidney Weiner FRCP FRAI (29 June 1915 – 13 June 1982) was a South African-born British human biologist and environmental physiologist. He was influential and among other things helped expose the Piltdown hoax. He was President of the Royal Anthropological Institute of Great Britain and Ireland, 1963–64, and Huxley Memorial Medallist in 1978.

Weiner maintained an abiding interest in heat adaptation in humans from his doctorate at London University in 1946, and was still publishing on the subject the year before he died.
