= Nebraska Man =

False ancient hominid species

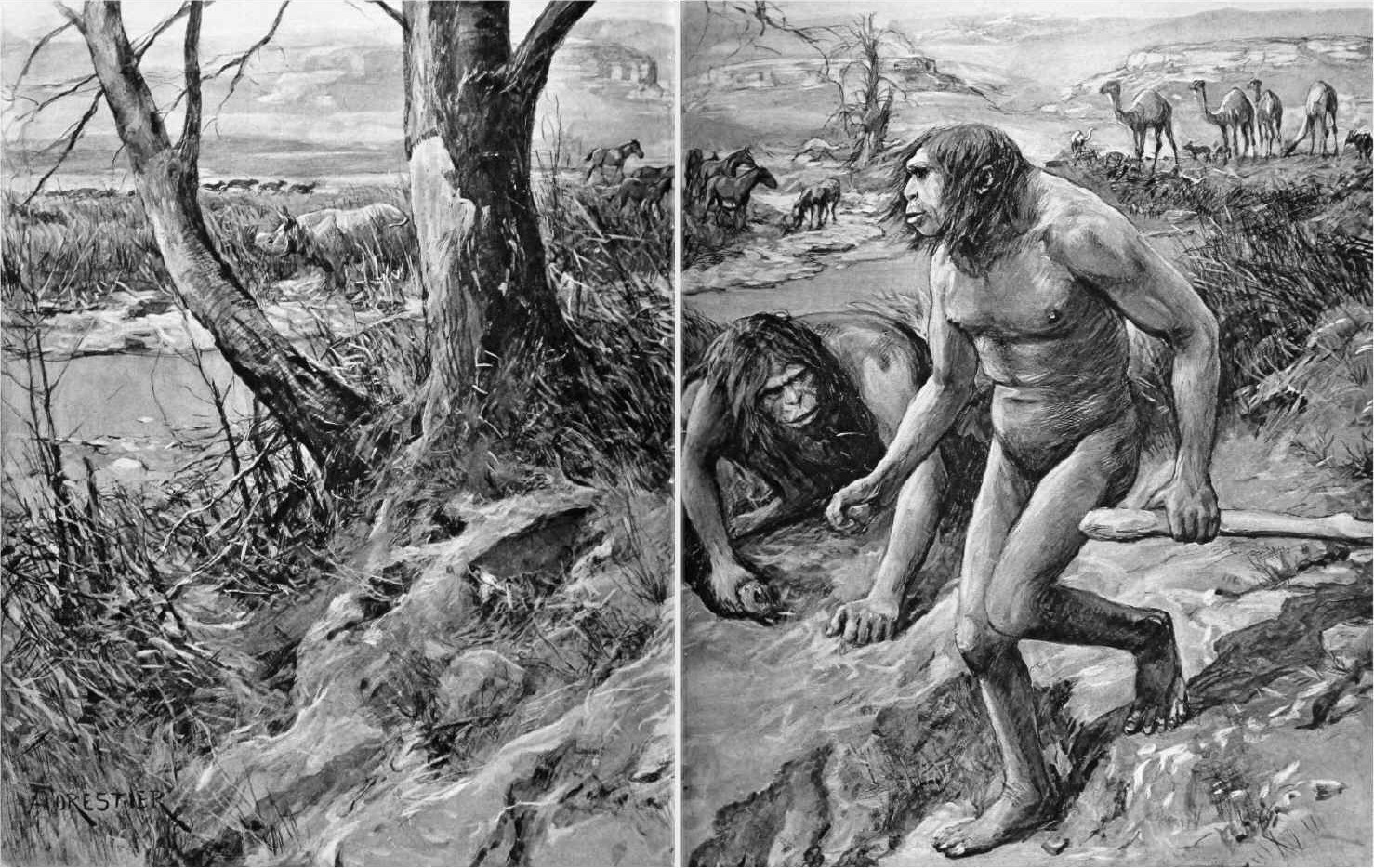
This illustration of H. haroldcookii, by artist Amédée Forestier, was modeled on the Java Man.

Nebraska Man was a name applied to Hesperopithecus haroldcookii, a putative species of ape. It was heralded as the first higher primate of North America. It was originally described by Henry Fairfield Osborn in 1922, on the basis of a tooth found by a rancher and geologist named Harold Cook in Nebraska in 1917. Although Nebraska Man was not a deliberate hoax, the original classification proved to be a mistake, and was retracted in 1927.

Hesperopithecus means "ape of the Western World", and HaroldCookii was given as the species name in reference to Cook.

== Publication and retraction ==
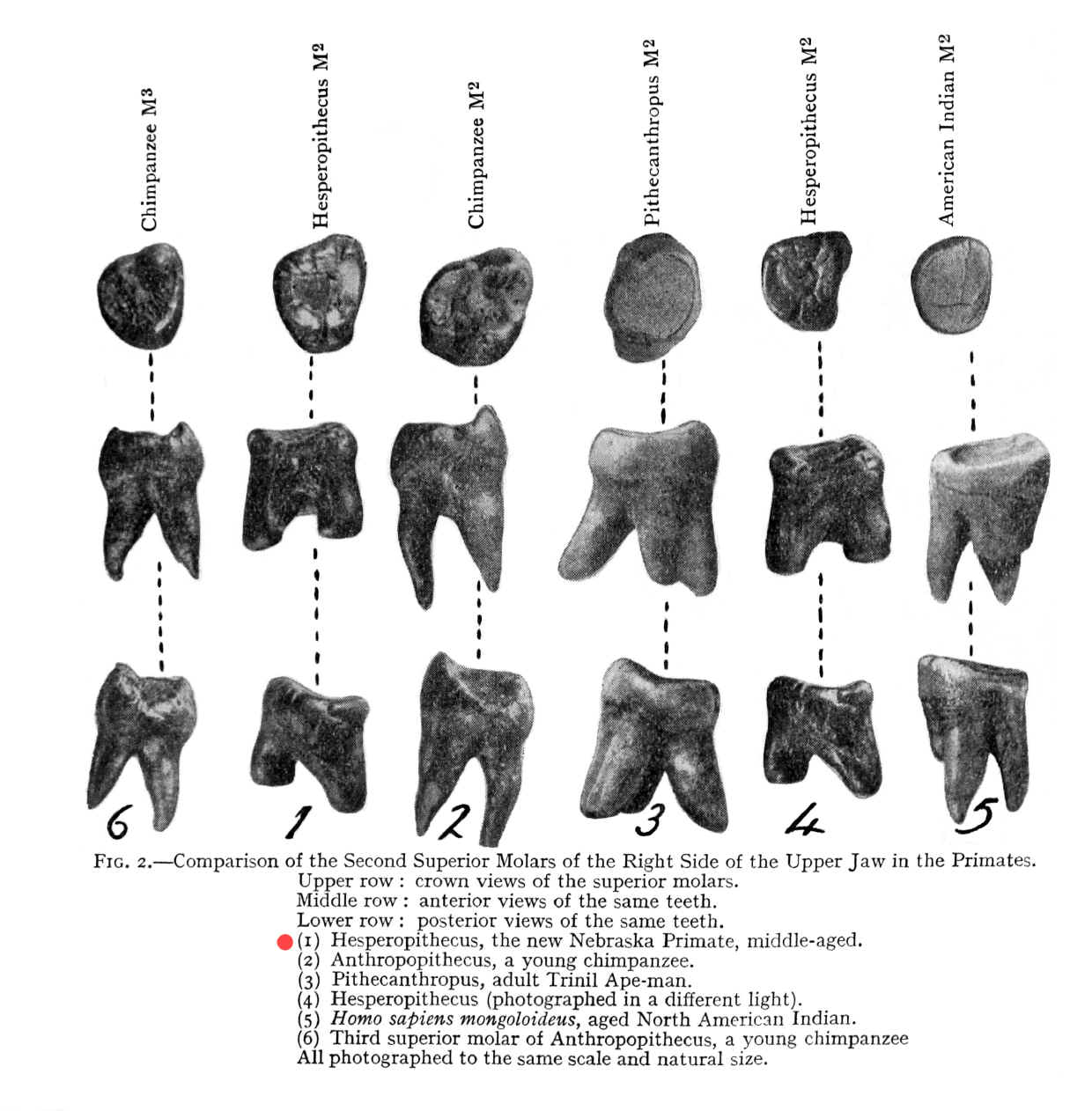
A comparison of the Hesperopithecus tooth with those of primates

In February 1922, Harold Cook wrote to Dr. Henry Osborn to inform him of a tooth that he had in his possession for some time. The tooth had been found years prior in the Upper Snake Creek beds of Nebraska along with other fossils typical of North America. Osborn received the specimen in March 1922, and quickly set out to identify it. Osborn, along with Dr. William D. Matthew soon came to the conclusion that the tooth had belonged to an anthropoid ape. They then passed the tooth along to William K. Gregory and Dr. Milo Hellman, who agreed that the tooth belonged to an anthropoid ape more closely related to humans than to other apes. Only a few months later, an article was published in Science announcing the discovery of a manlike ape in North America. An illustration of H. haroldcookii was done by artist Amédée Forestier, who modeled the drawing on the proportions of "Pithecanthropus" (now Homo erectus), the "Java ape-man," for the Illustrated London News. Osborn was not impressed with the illustration, calling it: "a figment of the imagination of no scientific value, and undoubtedly inaccurate".

From its initial description, Hesperopithecus was regarded as an inconclusive find by a large portion of the scientific community. Examinations of the specimen continued, and the original describers continued to draw comparisons between Hesperopithecus and apes. Further field work on the site in the summers of 1925 and 1926 uncovered other parts of the skeleton. These discoveries revealed that the tooth was incorrectly identified. According to these discovered pieces, the tooth belonged neither to a man nor an ape, but to a fossil of an extinct species of peccary called Prosthennops. The misidentification was attributed to the fact that the original specimen was severely weathered. The earlier identification as an ape was retracted in the journal Science in 1927.

== Role in the creationism vs. evolution debate ==
Although the identity of H. haroldcookii did not achieve general acceptance in the scientific community, and the purported species was retracted half a decade after the original article had been published by Osborn, creationists have promoted the episode as an example of the scientific errors that can undermine the credibility of paleontology and hominid evolution theories, and how such information is peer-reviewed or accepted as mainstream knowledge.

During the same time period as the discovery and examination of the tooth, the teaching of evolution in public schools was under fire in the Scopes trial. The prosecution was led by William Jennings Bryan. Leading up to the trial, Osborn and Bryan were engaged in a back-and-forth debate on the validity of the other's beliefs. However, at the trial, Osborn remained quiet on the subject of Nebraska man. The evidence was starting to build up against Hesperopithecus, and Osborn did not want to put the defense at risk of losing.

== See also ==
- National Center for Science Education
- Piltdown Man
- Homininae
- List of fossil primates
