= Dean Falk =

American neuroanthropologist

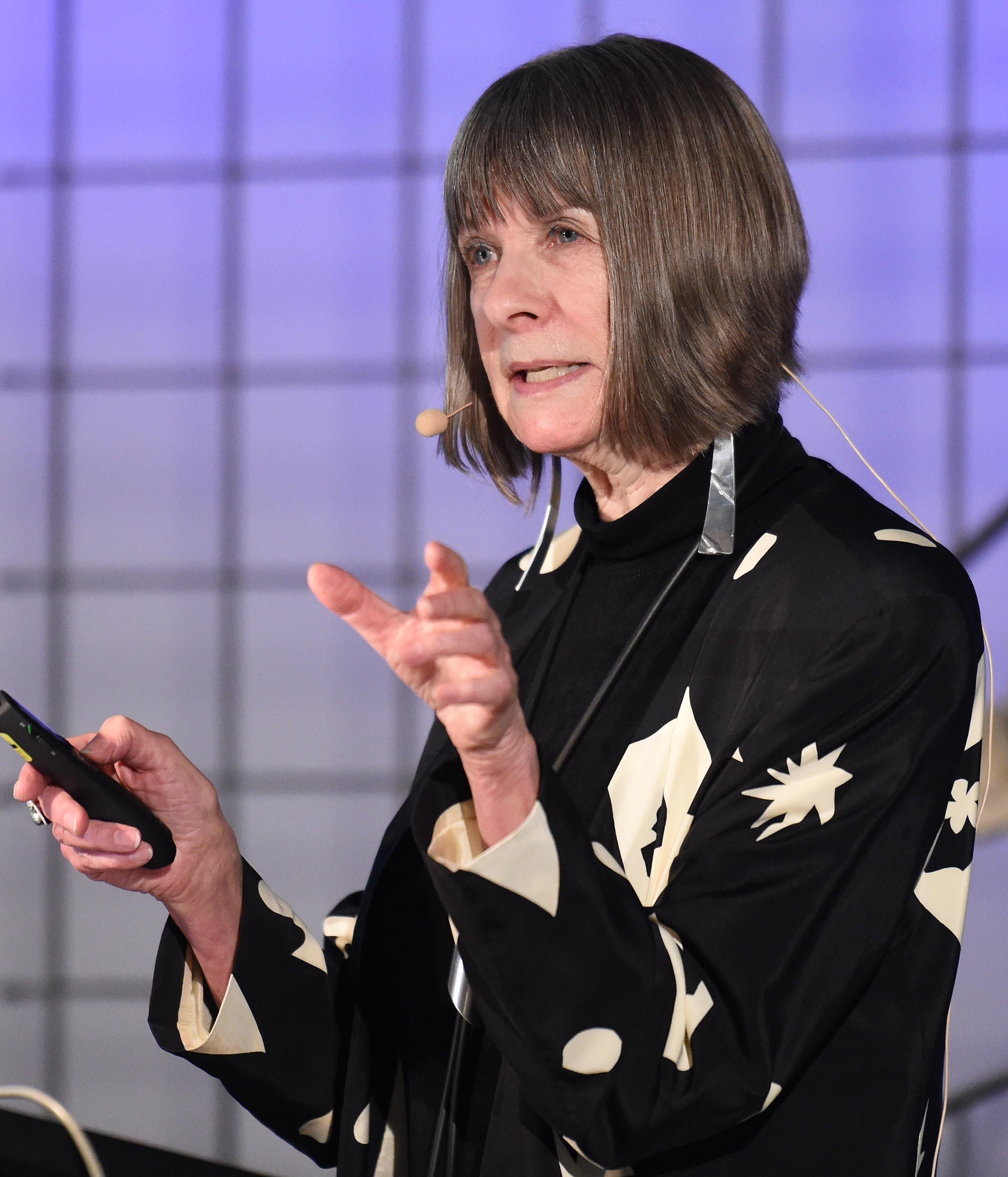
- Falk in 2017
- Born: June 25, 1944 (age 82)
- Education: University of Michigan
- Occupation: Anthropologist
- Organization: Florida State University

Dean Falk (born June 25, 1944) is an American academic neuroanthropologist who specializes in the evolution of the brain and cognition in higher primates. She is the Hale G. Smith Professor of Anthropology and a Distinguished Research Professor at Florida State University.

== Career ==
As an undergraduate, Falk studied mathematics and anthropology. Since receiving her PhD degree from the University of Michigan in 1976, she has taught courses in anatomy, neuroanatomy, and anthropology. Falk is interested in the evolution of the brain and cognition. She formulated the "radiator theory" that cranial blood vessels were important for hominin brain evolution, and the "putting the baby down" hypothesis that prehistoric mothers and infants facilitated the emergence of language.

She and colleagues described the brain of Homo floresiensis ("Hobbit") in 2005. In 2013, Falk and colleagues described the cerebral cortex of Albert Einstein from recently emerged photographs of his whole brain. In 2017, Falk coauthored a study with Charles Hildebolt on warfare in small-scale and state societies, which found that people are no less violent today than they were in the past. Falk coauthored a 2018 book on Asperger's syndrome with her 24-year-old granddaughter who has Asperger's, and, in 2019, challenged the allegation that Hans Asperger was a Nazi sympathizer. This was in turn disputed by the original author, Herwig Czech, who opined that Falk's paper abounded "with mistranslations, misrepresentations of the content of sources, and basic factual errors, and omits everything that does not support the author’s agenda of defending Hans Asperger’s record." He declared that the paper should never have passed the peer review process and should be retracted. Czech summarizes: "While her [Falk's] paper does not contain a single relevant piece of new evidence, large parts of her argument—for example with regards to Asperger’s apparent reluctance to report his patients for forced sterilization—actually rely on evidence provided in my paper, all the while ignoring the elements that do not support her narrative (Czech 2018, p. 18–19)." Falk responded to Czech’s rebuttal point-by-point, enumerated numerous factual errors that it contained, and concluded that Czech’s "criticism of the anonymous peer reviewers of my paper (who were quite helpful) and his call for its retraction are, at best, unconstructive. Because of the xenophobic and racist prejudices that shape current political events in the United States, Europe, and elsewhere, it is essential that details about Nazism, including the Nazi euthanasia program, continue to be deliberated. I, for one, am grateful to JADD [the Journal of Autism and Developmental Disorders] for publishing the present back-and-forth discussion, and I stand by my paper."

== Homo floresiensis ==
After the skeletal remains of a "Hobbit"-sized human (museum number LB1) that are now dated to over 65,000 years ago were discovered on the Indonesian island of Flores in 2003 they were identified as a new species labelled Homo floresiensis ("Hobbit"). Some scientists thought that the specimen must have been a pygmy or a microcephalic — a human with an abnormally small skull. Falk undertook a collaborative study in 2005 that described Hobbit's endocast and supported the claim that the find represented a new species.

Falk's 2005 study was criticized by other experts. In response, in 2007 with an international team of experts, Falk compared detailed maps of imprints left on the ancient hominid's braincase (endocasts) with those from microcephalic individuals and concluded that LB1, indeed, represented a new species that may have been descended from either Homo erectus or an earlier small-bodied hominin. Falk's team have repeatedly asserted that their findings confirm that the species cataloged as LB1, Homo floresiensis, is definitely not a human born with microcephalia — a somewhat rare pathological condition that still occurs today. She has also participated in other studies that refute the idea that LB1 had Laron syndrome or Down syndrome. Today, most experts do not think that LB1 was a diseased or developmentally disabled human. As noted by Westaway et al. (MC Westaway et al. [2015]. Mandibular evidence supports Homo floresiensis as a distinct species. PNAS 112[7], E604-E605), "Many interesting questions about the Liang Bua fossils remain unanswered, but whether LB1 is a pathological H. sapiens is not one of them".

== Human brain evolution ==
Falk led a team that described the entire cerebral cortex of Albert Einstein in 2013, and collaborated with Weiwei Men et al. in analyzing his corpus callosum.

In 2014, Falk published her work on "Interpreting sulci on hominin endocasts: old hypotheses and new findings in Frontiers in Human Neuroscience". Her work summarized what paleoneurologists could potentially learn about human brain evolution from fossils, which is confined to information about the evolution of brain size and how limited parts of the cerebral cortex became reorganized during evolution. Falk noted that the cerebral cortex is a highly evolved part of the human brain and that it facilitates conscious thought, planning, language, social skills, and scientific, artistic, and musical creativity. The cerebral cortex may leave imprints in skulls which are sometimes reproduced on endocasts. Falk observed that these studies exclude the internal brain structures that cannot be described by paleoneurologists because they do not show up on endocasts. These parts of the brain also evolved, and they are extremely important for processing memories, gut-level feelings, and social interactions in ways that set humans apart from other animals.

In 2018, Falk and colleagues published an in vivo magnetic resonance imaging study of the cerebral cortices of eight adult chimpanzees in which they identified sulcal patterns and compared them to those known from australopithecines and Homo naledi. This study showed that the frontal lobe sulcal patterns of australopiths (and H. naledi) were not derived compared to extant apes, contrary to Falk's 2014 paper.Falk, D.; Zollikofer, C.P.E.; Ponce de Leon, M.; Semendeferi, K.; Warren, J.L.A.; Hopkins, W.D. (2018). "Identification of in vivo sulci on the external surface of eight adult chimpanzee brains: Implications for interpreting early hominin endocasts". Brain, Behavior and Evolution. 91 (1): 45–58. doi:10.1159/000487248. PMID 29533941.

== Publications ==
=== Select books ===
- Falk, D. and E.P. Schofield (2018) Geeks, Genes, and the Evolution of Asperger Syndrome. University of New Mexico Press.
- Hofman, M.A. and D. Falk (eds) (2012) Evolution of the Primate Brain: From Neuron to Behavior. Progress in Brain Research, Elsevier.
- Falk, Dean (2011). The Fossil Chronicles: How Two Controversial Discoveries Changed Our View of Human Evolution. University of California Press. ISBN 978-0-520-26670-4.
- Falk, D. (2009) Finding Our Tongues: Mothers, Infants and the Origin of Language, Basic Books, New York ISBN 978-0-465-00219-1
- Falk, D. (2004) Braindance Revised and Expanded. University Press of Florida
- Falk, D. and K. Gibson (eds) (2001) Evolutionary Anatomy of the Primate Cerebral Cortex. Cambridge: Cambridge University Press
- Falk, D. (2000) Primate Diversity. New York: Norton

=== Select journal articles ===
- Falk, D (2019). "More on Asperger's Career: A reply to Czech". Journal of Autism and Developmental Disorders. 49 (9): 3877–3882. doi:10.1007/s10803-019-04099-6.
- Falk, D (2019). "Non-complicit: Revisiting Hans Asperger's Career in Nazi-era Vienna". Journal of Autism and Developmental Disorders. 50 (7): 2573–2584. doi:10.1007/s10803-019-03981-7. PMID 30887409.
- Falk, D.; Zollikofer, C.P.E.; Ponce; de Leon, M.; Semendeferi, K.; Warren, J.L.A.; Hopkins, W.D. (2018). "Identification of in vivo sulci on the external surface of eight adult chimpanzee brains: Implications for interpreting early hominin endocasts". Brain Behav Evol. 91: 45–58. doi:10.1159/000487248. PMID 29533941.
- Falk, D.; Hildebolt, C. (2017). "Annual war deaths in small-scale versus state societies scale with population size rather than violence". Current Anthropology. 58 (6): 805–813. doi:10.1086/694568.
- Falk, D (2014). "Interpreting sulci on hominin endocasts: Old hypotheses and new findings". Frontiers in Human Neuroscience. 8: 134. doi:10.3389/fnhum.2014.00134. PMC 4013485.
- Falk, D.; Lepore, F.; Noe, A. (2013). "The cerebral cortex of Albert Einstein: A description and preliminary analysis of unpublished photographs". Brain. 136 (4): 1304–1327. doi:10.1093/brain/aws295. PMC 3613708. PMID 23161163.
- Falk, D. "Happiness: An evolutionary perspective. (2012) In B. R. Johnston (Ed.), second Vital Topics Forum "On Happiness,"". American Anthropologist. 114 (1): 8–9.
- Falk, D (2009). "The natural endocast of Taung (Australopithecus africanus): Insights from the unpublished papers of Raymond Arthur Dart". Yrbk. Phys. Anthropol. 52 (S49): 49–65. Bibcode:2009AJPA..140S..49F. doi:10.1002/ajpa.21184. PMID 19890860.
- Falk, D.; Hildebolt, C.; Smith, K.; Morwood, M.J.; Sutikna, T.; Jatmiko, Saptomo; Imhof, H.; Seidler, H.; Prior, F. (2007). "Brain shape in human microcephalics and Homo floresiensis". PNAS. 104 (7): 2513–2518. Bibcode:2007PNAS..104.2513F. doi:10.1073/pnas.0609185104. PMC 1892980.
- Falk, D.; Hildebolt, C.; Smith, K.; Morwood, M.J.; Sutikna, T.; Brown, P.; Jatmiko, Saptomo W. E.; Brunsden, B.; Prior, F. (2005). "The brain of LB1, Homo floresiensis. Science Express, March 3, 2005;". Science. 308: 242–245. Bibcode:2005Sci...308..242F. doi:10.1126/science.1109727.
- Falk, D (2004). "Prelinguistic evolution in early hominins: Whence motherese?". Behavioral and Brain Sciences. 27 (4): 491–503. doi:10.1017/S0140525X04000111. PMID 15773427.
- Falk, D (1990). "Brain evolution in Homo: the "radiator" theory". Behav. Brain Sci. 13 (2): 333–344. doi:10.1017/S0140525X00078973.
- Men, W.; Falk, D.; Sun, T.; Chen, Wl; Li, J.; Yin, D.; Zang, L.; Fan, M. (2013). "The corpus callosum of Albert Einstein's brain: another clue to his high intelligence?". Brain. 137 (4): e268. doi:10.1093/brain/awt252. PMC 3959548.

== See also ==
- Albert Einstein's brain
