= Adaptations of The Most Dangerous Game =

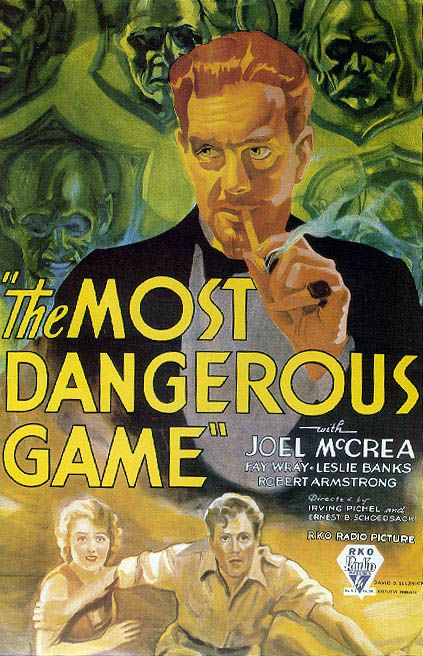
Theatrical release poster for The Most Dangerous Game (1932)

"The Most Dangerous Game" is an influential 1924 short story by Richard Connell. It tells the story of big-game hunter Sanger Rainsford becoming the hunted when trapped on a jungle island owned by General Zaroff, a Russian aristocrat who has turned to hunting man after becoming bored of hunting animals.

There have been many adaptations of "The Most Dangerous Game" across different forms of media, including film, radio, and television, among others.

== Film ==
The story has been directly adapted into films several times. Additionally, the story's plot has been used as inspiration for other films.

- The Most Dangerous Game (1932; dir. Irving Pichel and Ernest B. Schoedsack): Produced by RKO Pictures and the first major film adaptation of the original work.
- A Game of Death (1945; dir. Robert Wise): Produced by RKO Pictures, this version changes Zaroff into "Erich Kreiger", a Nazi, and is set in the aftermath of World War II.
- Run for the Sun (1956; dir. Roy Boulting): stars Richard Widmark, Trevor Howard and Jane Greer.
- Bloodlust! (1961; dir. Ralph Brooke): Stars Wilton Graff as the Zaroff-type character, and Robert Reed as the leader of a band of youths who become stranded on the island.
- Confessions of a Psycho Cat (1968; dir. Herb Stanley): An early sexploitation film taking place in New York City. Zaroff is replaced with a woman known as Virginia Marcus, who offers three acquitted murderers $100,000 if they can survive a night of her hunting them down. It takes little from the story apart from the concept of hunting humans for sport.
- The Suckers (1972; dir. Arthur Byrd): A sexploitation version, with the hunter using models as his prey.
- The Woman Hunt (1972; dir. Eddie Romero): Produced by Roger Corman for New World Pictures, it stars John Ashley and Sid Haig.
- Turkey Shoot (1982; dir. Brian Trenchard-Smith - originally released in the US as Escape 2000 and also known in the UK as Blood Camp Thatcher): Set in a country under a totalitarian rule, people labelled as "deviants" are sent to internment camps. At these establishments, the director allows the country's societal elite to use the "deviants" as game for their recreational hunting hobbies.
- Avenging Force (1986; dir. Sam Firstenberg): Starring Michael Dudikoff, the story of a former Secret Service agent and his partner who are lured into a trap by an ultra-right organization and used as live prey in a deadly hunt. As in Richard Connell’s short story, an elite group turns people into trophies, viewing the hunt of humans as the ultimate form of entertainment and superiority. The film reworks this premise as a martial-arts action movie in which the victim becomes the hunter.
- Slave Girls from Beyond Infinity (1987; dir. Ken Dixon): A sci-fi/sexploitation where scantily-clad women are hunted on an alien world by a mad scientist, Zed.
- Predator (1987; dir. John McTiernan): A group of Special Forces soldiers in South America find themselves hunted by an alien creature which wants to collect trophies.
- Deadly Prey (1987; dir. David A. Prior): A former soldier is kidnapped by mercenaries who train by hunting innocent people.
- Hard Target (1993; dir. John Woo): In New Orleans, homeless Vietnam War veterans serve as human prey for the hunt.
- Surviving the Game (1994; dir. Ernest Dickerson): Starring Rutger Hauer, Ice-T and Charles S. Dutton, it depicts a homeless man who is hired as a survival guide for a group of wealthy businessmen on a hunting trip in the mountains.
- The Pest (1997; dir. Paul Miller): A comedic parody, with German huntsman Gustav Shank (Jeffrey Jones) accidentally bringing teenage Puerto Rican hustler Pestario "Pest" Vargas (John Leguizamo) to his island instead of the skilled athlete he had intended to hunt, only to decide to hunt the Pest anyway due to his sheer obnoxiousness.
- The Eliminator (2004; dir. Ken Barbet): Seven captured people are hunted at night for sport on an island as a betting game for the wealthy.
- Piranha (2006; dir. Andrey Kavun): Starring Vladimir Mashkov tells the story of a former Russian Spetsnaz operative who falls into a trap in the Russian taiga set by a group of wealthy and powerful people staging an illegal human hunt as an extreme form of entertainment. As in “The Most Dangerous Game,” the victim is deliberately released into the wilderness—the Russian taiga—given a head start, and then pursued as prey. The film grounds this motif in specifically Russian realities—mercenaries, elite hunters, bandits, and Old Believers—turning the classic premise into a gritty modern action thriller.
- Never Leave Alive (2017; dir. Steven LaMorte): Stars WWE wrestler John Hennigan.
- The Hunt (2020; dir. Craig Zobel): A contemporary retelling, involving liberal elites hunting "deplorables" in and around a manor in Croatia.
- Tremors: Shrieker Island (2020; dir. Don Michael Paul): In the seventh installment of the Tremors franchise, Burt Gummer and several other unlucky people are trapped on an island with a trophy hunter, who hunts graboids for sport.
- Apex (2021; dir. Edward John Drake): An ex-cop serving a life sentence for a crime he didn’t commit is offered a chance at freedom if he can survive a deadly game in which a group of hunters pay for the pleasure of hunting another human on a remote island.
- The Most Dangerous Game (2022; dir. Justin Lee): A remake of the 1932 film.
- Death Hunt (2022; dir. Neil Mackay): A Canadian film variation on The Most Dangerous Game, as a couple is captured and hunted in the woods by three local men.
- Apex (2026; dir. Baltasar Kormákur): Starring Charlize Theron and Taron Egerton, tells the story of a rock climber and kayaker who finds herself hunted in Australia.

== Radio ==
"The Most Dangerous Game" has been presented four times as a radio play:

- The CBS radio program Suspense featured two separate adaptations of the story. The first, airing September 23, 1943, starred Orson Welles as Zaroff and Keenan Wynn as Rainsford. A second episode, aired on February 1, 1945, starred J. Carrol Naish as Zaroff and Joseph Cotten as Rainsford. Both Suspense productions presented an adaptation by Jack Finke in which Rainsford narrates the story in retrospect as he waits in Zaroff's bedroom for the final confrontation.
- The CBS radio program Escape also featured an adaptation of the story, airing October 1, 1947, with Paul Frees as Rainsford and Hans Conried as Zaroff.
- The CBS radio show Tales of Fatima aired an adaptation on September 24, 1949, featuring Basil Rathbone and Rex Harrison.

== Television ==
- The short-form mobile video platform Quibi released an adaptation called Most Dangerous Game starring Liam Hemsworth and Christoph Waltz. It takes place in modern-day Detroit where a dying man named Dodge agrees to be hunted for sport over a 24-hour period to earn money for his wife and their unborn child.
- In the Netflix series W/ Bob & David, episode 3 has a skit based on The Most Dangerous Game.
- In Season 3, Episode 2 of Star Trek: Lower Decks, "The Least Dangerous Game", Brad Boimler is hunted by an alien named K'ranch after agreeing to be his prey.

== Other adaptations ==
The story has also served as an inspiration for books and films like Seventh Victim, Battle Royale, Predator, Predators, The Running Man, The Pest and The Hunger Games.

- A translated version was published in Malayalam as an audio book by Kathacafe in 2017.

== Sources ==
- Senn, Bryan (2013). The Most Dangerous Cinema: People Hunting People on Film. McFarland. ISBN 978-0-7864-3562-3.
