= The Most Dangerous Game (2022 film) =

American thriller film

- Directed by: Justin Lee
- Written by: Justin Lee
- Based on: "The Most Dangerous Game"; 1924 story in Collier's by Richard Connell
- Produced by: Ed Morrone; Michelle Ng
- Starring: Tom Berenger; Judd Nelson; Bruce Dern; Casper Van Dien; Chris "CT" Tamburello
- Cinematography: Eamon Long
- Music by: Jared Forman
- Production companies: Koenig Pictures; Quiet On Set; Charach Productions; Greenfield Media
- Distributed by: Mill Creek Entertainment
- Release date: August 5, 2022
- Running time: 94 minutes
- Country: United States
- Language: English

The Most Dangerous Game is an American thriller film written and directed by Justin Lee, and starring Tom Berenger, Judd Nelson, Bruce Dern, Casper Van Dien and Chris "CT" Tamburello. It is a remake of the 1932 film of the same name, which is based on the 1924 short story by Richard Connell.

== Plot ==
A man is hunted by wealthy elites in a game he initially agrees to but comes to regret.

== Cast ==
- Chris "CT" Tamburello as Sanger Rainsford
- Casper Van Dien as Baron Von Wolf
- Judd Nelson as Marcus Rainsford
- Randy Charach as Rex Alan
- Tom Berenger as Benjamin Colt
- Bruce Dern as Whitney Tyler
- Elissa Dowling as Mary
- Eddie Finlay as Quin
- Kevin Porter as Ivan

== Production ==
The film was shot in the Koenig Pictures backlot in the Pacific Northwest in November 2021.

== Release ==
The film was released in theaters and on digital platforms on August 5, 2022.

== See also ==
- Adaptations of The Most Dangerous Game
