= Run for the Sun =

1956 film released by United Artists

- Theatrical poster
- Directed by: Roy Boulting
- Written by: Dudley Nichols; Roy Boulting
- Based on: Richard Connell
- Produced by: Robert Waterfield; Harry Tatelman
- Starring: Richard Widmark; Trevor Howard; Jane Greer; Peter van Eyck
- Cinematography: Joseph La Shelle
- Edited by: Frederic Knudtson
- Music by: Fred Steiner
- Production company: Russ-Field Corporation
- Distributed by: United Artists
- Release date: July 30, 1956 (United States)
- Running time: 99 minutes
- Country: United States
- Language: English
- Box office: $1.25 million (US)

Run for the Sun is a 1956 American Technicolor thriller adventure film released by United Artists, the third film to officially be based on Richard Connell's classic 1924 suspense story, "The Most Dangerous Game", after both RKO's The Most Dangerous Game (1932), and their remake, A Game of Death (1945). This version stars Richard Widmark, Trevor Howard, and Jane Greer, and was directed by Ray Boulting from a script written by Boulting and Dudley Nichols. Connell was credited for his short story.

In this loose adaptation, the expatriate Russian general of the original story is transformed into a British traitor hiding in the Mexican jungle with a fellow Nazi war criminal played by Peter van Eyck. Their prey are Widmark, portraying a Hemingway-like but reclusive novelist, and Greer, playing a magazine journalist who has tracked down the novelist's whereabouts. In this version, the Nazis are hunting them not for sport, but to prevent them revealing their whereabouts.

== Plot ==
While working for Sight magazine, journalist Katie Connors goes to San Marcos, a remote Mexican fishing village. She seeks novelist and adventurer Mike Latimer, who has abandoned writing "at the peak of his fame" and dropped from sight. He is in the village, indulging in drinking, fishing, hunting, and flying his aircraft. Katie contrives to meet Latimer, who is smitten. Over the next days, Katie starts falling in love with him but conceals the reason she is there.

After Latimer explains that his wife was the muse behind his literary success, and that he quit writing because she left him to be with his best friend, Katie decides to return to New York City. Latimer offers to fly her to Mexico City and asks Katie to write down her address to keep in touch. During the flight, the magnetized notebook in Katie's purse affects the aircraft's magnetic compass, and they find themselves lost over jungle. The aircraft runs out of fuel and Latimer crash-lands in a clearing. Knocked unconscious, he wakes up to find himself in a bed in the main house of a hacienda.

Katie introduces him to their rescuers, the Englishman Browne and the Dutch archaeologist Dr. Van Anders, who live on the estate with Jan, another European. When asked about a rifle bullet that Latimer carries, he says that it is a souvenir and good luck charm from the D-Day invasion, a time when his courage failed him.

Browne, a big game hunter, claims that he has no contact with the outside world. He keeps savage dogs to prowl the estate and control the local populace. When Latimer goes to examine the condition of his aircraft, it has disappeared. Later, a newscast on the radio announcing their disappearance reveals Katie's identity and original purpose. Katie tries to persuade an offended Latimer that she no longer intends to write the story but he rebuffs her.

That night, Latimer finds a storeroom containing military gear with Nazi markings, items from his missing aircraft supposedly stolen by the local natives, and hunting rifles. The dogs' barking awakens Browne and Van Anders. Latimer overhears them talking in German and tells Katie what he found. He says that they need to work together to escape. They discover that Browne has been concealing from them his own "flyable" aircraft.

Latimer eventually recognizes Browne's voice; the latter turns out to be an infamous turncoat who during the war broadcast Nazi propaganda from Berlin to Britain after having married a German woman. Browne admits the truth and adds that his wife was Van Anders' sister, killed in a British air raid. Van Anders is Colonel Von Andre, a German war criminal who massacred an entire village and intends to kill Latimer and Katie. The two try to steal the aircraft, but when Jan shoots at them, they flee into the jungle.

Browne, leading Van Anders, Jan and the dogs, follows their trail, failing to catch them the first day when wild pigs attack the dogs. The next day, Latimer rigs a crude booby trap that kills Jan. With Katie nearing exhaustion, Latimer doubles back, and when Browne and Van Anders find Jan's dead body, they realize that the aircraft has been left unguarded. Stopping for the night, Latimer finds that she wrote down the office address of Sight magazine as her own, proving that she had been truthful about her feelings.

They reach the hacienda before their pursuers and barricade themselves in the chapel. Van Anders pretends to negotiate with Latimer and shoots through the door. Latimer ridicules him, and when Van Anders goes to bring workers to break down the door, he is forced to lock up the dogs to get their cooperation. Browne fears the Nazi, and offers to shoot Van Anders if Latimer flies him to South America. Latimer refuses and uses the bullet hole in the door as a makeshift gun barrel, striking the primer with a chisel and fatally shooting Browne. Latimer and Katie take off in Browne's aircraft, killing Van Anders with the propeller when he tries to block their path. They manage to escape safely.

== Cast ==
- Richard Widmark as Michael Latimer
- Trevor Howard as Browne
- Jane Greer as Katie Connors
- Peter van Eyck as Dr. Van Anders / Colonel Von Andre
- Juan García as Fernandez
- José Antonio Carbajal as Paco
- José Chávez as Pedro (as José Chávez Trowe)
- Guillermo Calles as Paco
- Margarito Luna as Gran-Hotel Proprietor
- Guillermo Bravo Sosa as Gran-Hotel Waiter
- Enedina Díaz de León as Paco's Wife
- Carlos Henning as Jan

== Production ==
Run for the Sun was one of four films produced for United Artists release by a company owned by actress Jane Russell and her then husband, former NFL star Bob Waterfield. Originally Russell and Robert Mitchum were announced as stars. Then Eva Marie Saint was going to play the female lead.

Robert Wilder wrote the original script and Dudley Nichols was brought in to work on it.

Roy Boulting was signed to direct in August 1955. The original stars were to be Richard Widmark and Leo Genn. Jane Greer later joined the cast.

Genn was meant to play the head villain, and he had script approval at a rate of $3,500 a week plus expenses. The script was rewritten and Genn did not like the result when he arrived in Mexico to start filming. He pulled out, and Trevor Howard was cast instead. Genn later sued Waterfield, who eventually had to pay Genn his complete salary.

The jungle sequences were shot about 50 miles from Acapulco, Mexico. The location used for Browne and Van Anders' base was a vast, ruined, 16th century hacienda and sugar plantation/refinery built by Hernán Cortés at Atlacomulco, southeast of Cuernavaca. In the 1980s, the principal house and several other buildings were restored and turned into a hotel. The interior and patio of the house used in the film, as well as the interior of the small hotel where Katie Connors and Mike Latimer meet, were sets built at Estudios Churubusco in Mexico City. The house interior was reputed to be the largest set yet built in a Mexican studio. (Note: In the film, the supporting villain is a German, "von Andre", who passes as a Dutchman, "Van Anders." In actuality, the actor playing him, Peter van Eyck – a Dutch name – was born Götz von Eick and changed his name when becoming an actor.)

== Reception ==
Film reviewer Leslie Halliwell in Leslie Halliwell's Film Guide (1989), noted that Run for the Sun was a "... tame remake of 'The Most Dangerous Game' with Count Zaroff replaced by Lord Haw-Haw; sluggish plot development mars the action."

Film reviewer Adrian Turner in the Time Out Film Guide (2004), said that Run for the Sun: "... never really gets to grip with the grotesquerie of the original story, though Howard as a dead ringer for Lord Haw-Haw, is excellent."
