= Richard E. Connell =

American politician (1857–1912)

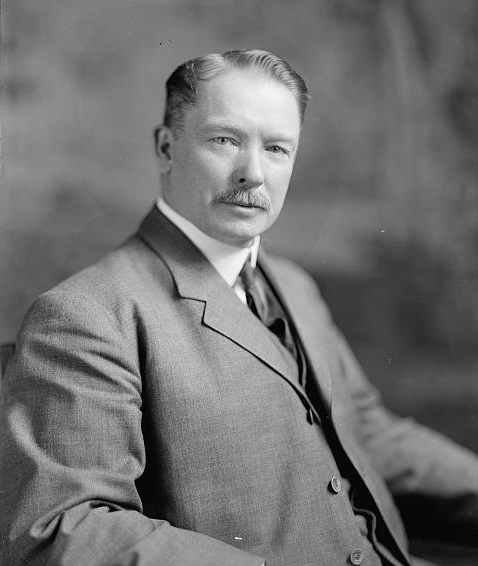
- Connell c. 1911

Member of the U.S. House of Representatives from New York's 21st district
- In office March 4, 1911 – October 30, 1912
- Preceded by: Hamilton Fish II
- Succeeded by: Henry George Jr.

Personal details
- Born: Richard Edward Connell; November 6, 1857 Poughkeepsie, New York, US
- Died: October 30, 1912 (aged 54) Poughkeepsie, New York, US
- Resting place: St. Peter's Cemetery
- Party: Democratic
- Spouse: Mary Miller
- Children: 4, including Richard

Richard Edward Connell Sr. (November 6, 1857 – October 30, 1912) was an American newspaperman and politician who served one term as a United States representative from New York from March 4, 1911, until his death on October 30, 1912.

== Early life ==
Richard Edward Connell was born in Poughkeepsie, Dutchess County, New York, to Richard and Ann Connell (née Phelan), who had immigrated to New York from Kilkenny, Ireland, in 1846. Connell, a Catholic, attended St. Peter's parochial school and the public schools of Poughkeepsie until he was 13 years old when he dropped out and entered the workforce to support his siblings and widowed mother. He worked various odd jobs including for the Poughkeepsie and Eastern Railway and Hudson River State Hospital. He was eventually hired as a reporter for the Poughkeepsie News-Press before rising to managing editor.

== Political career ==
Connell first rose to local political prominence in 1884 when he began giving speeches in support of presidential candidate Grover Cleveland. He was a perennially unsuccessful candidate in the 19th century. He failed to be elected over John H. Ketcham to the 55th United States Congress in 1896 or to the New York State Assembly in 1898 and 1900. After repeated failures, Connell attempted to curry favor with schoolchildren in the hopes that they would vote for him when they came of age.

Between his campaigns, Connell served as police commissioner of Poughkeepsie for three years beginning in 1892, Dutchess County's inheritance tax appraiser from 1907 to 1909 and delegate to the Democratic National Convention in 1900 and 1904.

In 1910, Connell and Hyde Park resident Franklin D. Roosevelt embarked on a joint campaign in the Hudson Valley in Roosevelt's Maxwell automobile; Connell was running for the U.S. House of Representatives and Roosevelt for the New York State Senate. From Connell, Roosevelt would borrow the opening phrase with which he would begin many speeches for the rest of his career: "My friends." Connell defeated the incumbent, Republican Hamilton Fish II, by 517 votes to win election to the 62nd United States Congress.

In his brief time in Congress, Connell collaborated with Representative Isaac R. Sherwood in championing a successful Civil War veterans' pension bill. He had been nominated in 1912 as the Democratic candidate for reelection to the 63rd United States Congress.

== Personal life and death ==
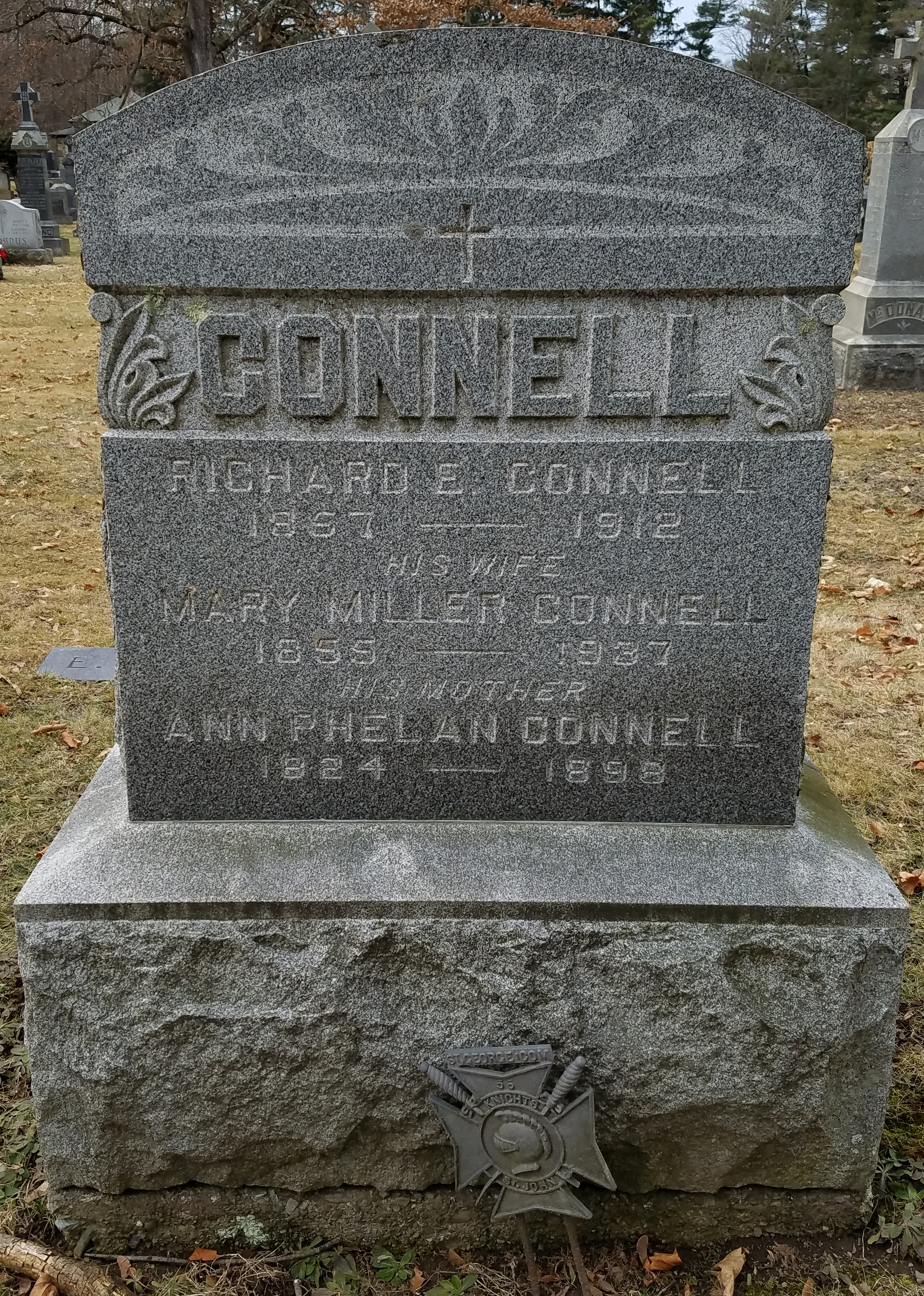
Connell's grave at St. Peter's Cemetery in Poughkeepsie

Connell and his wife Mary (née Miller) had four children, Mary, Anne, Catherine, and Richard. The younger Richard, who was his father's secretary during sessions of Congress, would go on to become an accomplished writer best known for his short story "The Most Dangerous Game."

Connell was a member of the Royal Arcanum, Knights of Columbus and Order of Elks.

Connell spent the night of October 29, 1912 making speeches in Putnam County and returned home to Poughkeepsie around 2:00 a.m. When he did not get out of bed the following morning for an 8:00 a.m. car which was hired to bring him to meet constituents in Middletown, his wife found him unresponsive. He had died in his sleep of heart disease.

He is buried in St. Peter's Cemetery in Poughkeepsie.

== Electoral history ==
New York's 18th congressional district election, 1896
Party	Candidate	Votes	%
Republican	John H. Ketcham	25,531	60.86
Democratic	Richard E. Connell	15,956	38.04
National Democratic	Henry Metcalf	462	1.1
Total votes		41,949	100.00
Republican hold			

1904 New York State Assembly election, Dutchess County 2
Party	Candidate	Votes	%
Republican	Augustus B. Gray	5,491	52.61
Democratic	Richard E. Connell	4,761	45.64
Prohibition	Corydon Wheeler	183	1.75
Total votes		10,435	100.00
Republican gain from Democratic			

New York's 21st congressional district election, 1910
Party	Candidate	Votes	%
Democratic	Richard E. Connell	18,832	49.79
Republican	Hamilton Fish II (incumbent)	18,315	48.42
Socialist	David F. Slater	677	1.79
Total votes		37,824	100.00
Democratic gain from Republican			

== See also ==
- List of members of the United States Congress who died in office (1900–1949)

U.S. House of Representatives
Preceded by Hamilton Fish II	Member of the U.S. House of Representatives from New York's 21st congressional district 1911–1912	Succeeded by Henry George Jr.
