= Most Dangerous Game =

American action web television series

- Genre: Action thriller
- Created by: Nick Santora; Josh Harmon; Scott Elder
- Based on: "The Most Dangerous Game" by Richard Connell
- Written by: Nick Santora
- Directed by: Phil Abraham
- Starring: Liam Hemsworth; Christoph Waltz; Sarah Gadon; David Castañeda
- Country of origin: United States
- No. of seasons: 2
- No. of episodes: 27

Production
- Executive producers: Gero Bauknecht; Gerd Schepers; Gordon Gray; Frank Siracusa; John Weber; Kevin Lafferty
- Producer: Peter M. Tassler
- Cinematography: Matthew J. Lloyd
- Production companies: BlackJack Films; Mayhem Pictures; Silver Reel; CBS Studios

Original release
- Network: Quibi (season 1); The Roku Channel (season 2)
- Release: April 6, 2020 – March 10, 2023

Most Dangerous Game is an American action television series created by Nick Santora, Josh Harmon, and Scott Elder that debuted on Quibi on April 6, 2020. It is inspired by the 1924 short story "The Most Dangerous Game" by Richard Connell. On May 20, 2021, the series was released on the Roku Channel. On August 23, 2021, it was renewed for a second season on the Roku Channel. In May 2022, Amazon Prime Video started streaming a compiled version of the first season episodes as a 2 hour, 7 minute feature film. On March 10, 2023 the second season premiered, consisting of 12 episodes. In September 2023, The Roku Channel removed the series.

== Plot ==
=== Season 1 ===
Dodge Tynes is a former athlete and a bankrupt real estate developer living in Detroit. After passing out from a headache, he wakes up in the hospital where two doctors tell him and his pregnant wife Val that he has an inoperable brain tumor. A nurse offers him a business card for Tiro Fund, a company that supposedly helps those with terminal illnesses who are financially struggling.

Dodge visits Tiro Fund and meets Miles Sellars, who offers him a deal: for 24 hours, Dodge will be the "prey" hunted by five "hunters" that will try to kill him. In exchange, he will have money wired to his bank account for every hour he survives, with the increments growing for every hour up to 24.5 million dollars. Miles also explains the rules: Dodge cannot stop or pause the game once it starts; he cannot tell anyone he is in the game; and he cannot leave the city. If he breaks these rules, the game will never end until he dies. Dodge initially rejects the offer, but later decides to take it at the promise of leaving Val and their child financially secure. The game starts at sunrise at 6:46 AM at a diner where Miles takes all of Dodge's belongings except for his medication, an ultrasound of his child, and a phone Miles gives him to track his location. For 15 seconds every hour, the phone will send his current location to the hunters.

The game begins, and Dodge eventually comes across and evades the five hunters: Nixon, a British gentleman who strictly follows the rules of the hunt; Reagan, a southern cowboy; Carter, a psychologist who uses Dodge's profile to track his next move; Kennedy, a martial arts expert; and LBJ, an older man. Dodge also runs into Connell, one of Miles' subordinates in charge of watching Dodge from the streets and cleaning up after the game.

Meanwhile, Val uses Dodge's laptop and discovers a total of $300,000 deposited to his account. When Dodge does not answer her calls, she gets suspicious. She calls the police, but they are unable to file a missing person's report. Val later finds the Tiro Fund card, but finds the company's office empty. Dodge tries to go back home, and Val sees him, but Carter chases after him. After a chase, Dodge kills Carter with a cinderblock. Dodge's friend Looger finds Dodge, but Dodge escapes when Nixon follows them.

Later, after his phone reveals his location, a shootout takes place and LBJ is killed while Reagan is injured. Dodge goes to the hospital where a nurse confirms that his medicine is fake and that there are no records of him ever being admitted there. He calls Miles, who admits that Dodge does not have a terminal illness and had been set up to accept the game. Miles reveals that Looger accepted $50,000 to drug Dodge and explains that the rules still stand. Val is kidnapped and taken to Miles as hostage.

Dodge sets traps for Nixon, Reagan, and Kennedy in his father's abandoned workshop. The three of them arrive, but Looger shoots Kennedy when she tries to kill Dodge. Dodge blows up the shop, killing Reagan, but Nixon escapes. When Connell arrives to clean up the mess, Dodge attacks him and demands to know where Val is. Connell reveals Miles had set up their base at The Carrington, Dodge's failed high-rise development.

Dodge heads to The Carrington and finds the building abandoned and Val tied up. Nixon chases Dodge to the rooftop and in the ensuing fight, Dodge falls off and hangs from the ledge. Nixon prepares to kill him by stabbing his hand, but he sees the sun rise, puts his weapon away, and politely helps Dodge back on his feet. Nixon congratulates him for a good game before walking away. Val reunites with Dodge, who gets a final call from Miles telling him that he has won the game and the money. Miles receives a new file for the next prey.

== Cast ==
=== Main ===
- Liam Hemsworth as Dodge Tynes, the "prey" (season 1)
- Sarah Gadon as Val, Dodge's wife (season 1)
- Christoph Waltz as Miles Sellars, the hunt organizer
- David Castañeda as Victor Suero, the "prey" (season 2)
- Martina Ortiz Luis as Josie Suero, Victor's sister (season 2)

=== Recurring ===
- Zach Cherry as Looger, Dodge's friend (season 1)
- Aaron Poole as Connell, one of Miles' subordinates in charge of watching the prey
- Devon Bostick as Green, one of Miles' subordinates
- Chris Webster as Nixon, a hunter
- Billy Burke as Reagan, a hunter (season 1)
- Jimmy Akingbola as Carter, a hunter (season 1)
- Natasha Liu Bordizzo as Kennedy, a hunter (season 1)
- Patrick Garrow as LBJ, a hunter (season 1)
- Carolina Bartczak as Wife from baseball game (season 1)
- Martin Roach as Dupree, Victor's boss (season 2)
- Anna Gunn as Chairwoman, Chairwoman of Tiro Fund and Miles' boss (season 2)
- Ciara Bravo as Tina, one of Miles' subordinates (season 2)
- Currie Graham as Detective Mike Roland, a detective investigating Victor (season 2)
- Mark McKenna as Taft, a hunter (season 2)
- Kevin Durand as Tyler, a hunter (season 2)
- Alex Barima as Monroe, a hunter (season 2)
- Kyle Mac as Ford, a hunter (season 2)
- Mishael Morgan as Pierce, a hunter (season 2)

== Episodes ==
Season	Episodes	Originally released		
Season	Episodes	First released	Last released	Network
1	15	April 6, 2020	April 22, 2020	Quibi
2	12	March 10, 2023		The Roku Channel

=== Season 1 (2020) ===
No. overall	No. in season	Title	Directed by	Written by	Original release date
1	1	"The Offer"	Phil Abraham	Nick Santora	April 6, 2020
2	2	"The Motivation"	Phil Abraham	Nick Santora	April 6, 2020
3	3	"The Rules"	Phil Abraham	Nick Santora	April 6, 2020
4	4	"The Acceptance"	Phil Abraham	Nick Santora	April 7, 2020
5	5	"The Start"	Phil Abraham	Nick Santora	April 8, 2020
6	6	"Wash Hands After Using"	Phil Abraham	Nick Santora	April 9, 2020
7	7	"No Running on the Platform"	Phil Abraham	Nick Santora	April 10, 2020
8	8	"Please Whisper In Church"	Phil Abraham	Nick Santora	April 13, 2020
9	9	"Return Tools to their Place"	Phil Abraham	Nick Santora	April 14, 2020
10	10	"Five for Fighting"	Phil Abraham	Nick Santora	April 15, 2020
11	11	"You Always Remember Your First"	Phil Abraham	Nick Santora	April 16, 2020
12	12	"A Ship Is Safe Only In Port"	Phil Abraham	Nick Santora	April 17, 2020
13	13	"Always Get a Second Opinion"	Phil Abraham	Nick Santora	April 20, 2020
14	14	"What’s Old Is New Again"	Phil Abraham	Nick Santora	April 21, 2020
15	15	"Game Over"	Phil Abraham	Nick Santora	April 22, 2020

=== Season 2 (2023) ===
No. overall	No. in season	Title	Directed by	Written by	Original release date
16	1	"Auction"	Sam Hill	Nick Santora	March 10, 2023
17	2	"Play Ball"	Sam Hill	Nick Santora	March 10, 2023
18	3	"Devil in the Outfield"	Sam Hill	Nick Santora	March 10, 2023
19	4	"On the Wrong Track"	Sam Hill	Nick Santora	March 10, 2023
20	5	"En Fuego"	Sam Hill	Nick Santora	March 10, 2023
21	6	"Katie Girl"	Sam Hill	Nick Santora	March 10, 2023
22	7	"Busted"	Sam Hill	Nick Santora	March 10, 2023
23	8	"A Good Lawyer's Hard to Find"	Sam Hill	Nick Santora	March 10, 2023
24	9	"Company at the Water Company"	Sam Hill	Nick Santora	March 10, 2023
25	10	"One Way Ticket"	Sam Hill	Nick Santora	March 10, 2023
26	11	"Lighthouse"	Sam Hill	Nick Santora	March 10, 2023
27	12	"Blood Work"	Sam Hill	Nick Santora	March 10, 2023

== Production ==
Season one was filmed in Hamilton and Toronto, Canada, and Detroit, US.

== Reception ==
On Rotten Tomatoes, season one has a 57% rating with an average score of 6.20 out of 10 based on 30 reviews. The site's critical consensus reads, "Most Dangerous Game's early episodes play it too safe, but its timely twist on a classic tale and a delicious turn from Christoph Waltz inspire hope that fun could be afoot yet."

== Accolades ==
Year	Award	Category	Nominee(s)	Result	Ref.
2020	Primetime Emmy Awards	Outstanding Short Form Comedy or Drama Series	Nick Santora, Gero Bauknecht, Gerd Schepers, Gordon Gray, Liam Hemsworth and Phil Abraham	Nominated	
2020	Primetime Emmy Awards	Outstanding Actor in a Short Form Comedy or Drama Series	Christoph Waltz	Nominated	
2021	Writers Guild of America Awards	Original & Adapted Short Form New Media	Nick Santora, Josh Harmon and Scott Elder	Nominated	

== See also ==
- Adaptations of The Most Dangerous Game
