= Confessions of a Psycho Cat =

1968 film by Herb Stanley

- Poster for the film
- Directed by: Herb Stanley (as Eve)
- Screenplay by: Bill Boyd
- Based on: The Most Dangerous Game by Richard Connell
- Produced by: Herb Stanley (as Eve)
- Starring: Eileen Lord; Ed Brandt; Frank Grace; Dick Lord; Jake LaMotta
- Cinematography: Paul Guffee
- Production company: Chancellor Films
- Release date: February 1, 1968
- Country: USA
- Language: English

Confessions of a Psycho Cat (also known as 3 Loves of a Psycho Cat) is a 1968 American black and white sexploitation film directed by Herb Stanley and released by Chancellor Films.

It was the first adaptation of "The Most Dangerous Game" with a female hunter.

== Plot ==
Washed up actor Charles Freeman, former wrestling champion Rocco (Jake LaMotta), and drug dealer Buddy are approached by wealthy beatnik Virginia Marcus. Virginia notes that each of them has been acquitted of murder and offers them $100,000 if they can survive being hunted by her for 24 hours through the streets of Manhattan. Each of them agree and are given a check post-dated to the next day before leaving the building.

Virginia uses her connections to secure a last minute acting job for Charles who is unable to resist the opportunity, after the performance is over he is ambushed and shot with an arrow. After many taunting phone calls Rocco meets Virginia (dressed as a matador) in her apartment, where he is stabbed with two toreador spears by manservant Bi before being killed by Virginia. Buddy manages to evade his hunter after being wounded and hides at sex-fueled party of his clients but desperate for a fix he leaves the party to buy drugs, only to be killed when Virginia hits him with an arrow.

Virginia's brother Anderson is contacted by her psychiatrist about her increasingly erratic behavior, and he returns from Africa. He arrives home to find the three bodies in the freezer. The film ends with Virginia screaming as she is restrained in a straight-jacket.

== Cast ==
- Eileen Lord as Virginia Marcus
- Ed Brandt as Anderson
- Frank Grace as Buddy
- Dick Lord as Charles Freeman
- Jake LaMotta as Rocco
