= The Suckers =

1972 American sexploitation film

- Theatrical release poster
- Directed by: Stu Segall (as Arthur Byrd)
- Written by: Ted Paramore (as Edward Everett)
- Starring: Richard Smedley; Lori Rose; Vincent Stevens; Sandy Dempsey; Barbara Mills; Norman Fields
- Cinematography: Hal Guthu
- Edited by: Lawrence Avery
- Production company: Cromwell Pictures
- Distributed by: Entertainment Ventures
- Release date: 1972
- Running time: 79 minutes
- Country: United States
- Language: English
- Budget: $30,000

The Suckers is a 1972 American sexploitation film directed by Stu Segall under the pseudonym Arthur Byrd, and written by Ted Paramore (credited as Edward Everett). It is an adaptation of the 1924 short story "The Most Dangerous Game", written by Richard Connell, with a plot that follows a big-game hunter who invites employees from a modeling agency to his estate, where he hunts them. The film stars Richard Smedley, Lori Rose, Vincent Stevens, Sandy Dempsey, Barbara Mills, and Norman Fields.

The Suckers was filmed in the Bronson Canyon area of California over the course of three days, and was released in the United States in 1972. The only surviving print of the film, from a 1976 re-release, appears to contain at least two instances of missing footage. This print was used for a DVD release of the film by Vinegar Syndrome in 2013.

== Cast ==
- Richard Smedley as Jeff Baxter
- Lori Rose as Joanne
- Steve Vincent as Steve Vandemeer (credited as Vincent Stevens)
- Sandy Dempsey as Barbara
- Barbara Mills as Cindy Stone
- Norman Fields as George Stone

== Production ==
"We were all really into making the movie. The T&A part was no big deal to us—we were all 24, 25-year-old kids doin' this (except for the guys like Dave Friedman, Ted [Paramore] and the cameraman). We were a bunch of young ne'er-do-wells just makin' movies however we could make 'em."

— Director Stu Segall recalling the production of The Suckers.

The Suckers was filmed in 35 mm over the course of three days, in the Bronson Canyon area of the Hollywood Hills in California. The film's budget is estimated to have been around $30,000, and the crew was reportedly made up of "less than ten" people. According to director Stu Segall, the film was "very cheaply made", with the crew making around $50 a day and the cast members making around $150.

During filming one day, actor Norman Fields swallowed a bee before he was able to finish his scenes. He was taken to a hospital and returned to the set several hours later.

== Home media ==
In April 2013, The Suckers was released on DVD by Vinegar Syndrome as a double feature with the 1971 film The Love Garden. This release made use of the lone surviving print of The Suckers, from a 1976 re-release of the film by Lee Ming Film Company. This print appears to feature at least two instances of missing footage, which take place during Vandemeer's hunt for other characters.

== Critical reception ==
Bryan Senn, in his book The Most Dangerous Cinema: People Hunting People on Film, wrote that certain directorial decisions, "and/or intuitive happy accidents", that he observed in The Suckers causes him to "wish that Segall had slipped his sexploitation bonds and received more opportunities to make 'straight' films". He concluded: "while not always 'fun' watching, The Suckers offers just enough, both sexploitation- and Most Dangerous Game-wise, to keep viewers from feeling one."

In 2023, a reviewer for Pulp International criticized the film's structure, writing: "Even though The Suckers is a sexploitation movie, we expected the ratio of skin to action to be roughly equivalent, but the hunting scenes take up only about twenty minutes, while sex consumes about thirty minutes, a couple of sexual assaults take about ten, and bad dialogue fills out the rest of the running time. [...] The Suckers is just gratuitous and haphazard. Its failure is probably why it was later released as The Woman Hunt—because a certain segment of the male population would see it based on that title alone."
