= A Game of Death =

1945 film by Robert Wise

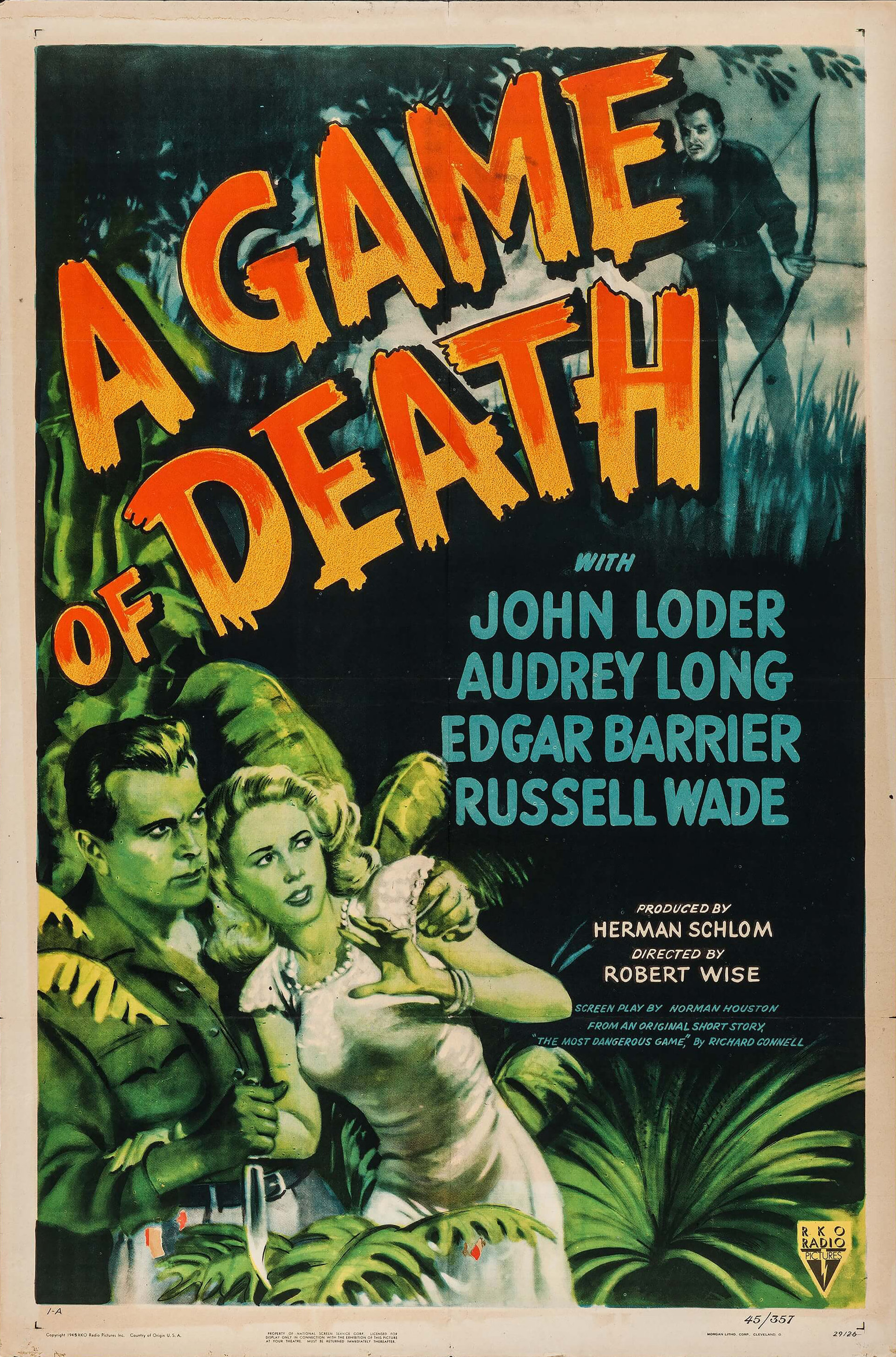
- Theatrical release poster
- Directed by: Robert Wise
- Written by: Norman Houston
- Based on: "The Most Dangerous Game" by Richard Connell
- Produced by: Herman Schlom
- Starring: John Loder
- Cinematography: J. Roy Hunt
- Edited by: J.R. Whittredge
- Music by: Paul Sawtell
- Production company: RKO Radio Pictures
- Distributed by: RKO Radio Pictures
- Release date: November 23, 1945 (U.S.)
- Running time: 72 min.
- Country: United States
- Language: English

A Game of Death is a 1945 American adventure film directed by Robert Wise and starring John Loder and Audrey Long. It is a remake of Richard Connell's 1924 short story "The Most Dangerous Game" about a madman who hunts human prey on his island. In the original story and in the 1932 film adaptation, the madman is Russian, but in the 1945 version, he is German.

== Cast ==
- John Loder as Don Rainsford
- Audrey Long as Ellen Trowbridge
- Edgar Barrier as Erich Kreiger
- Russell Wade as Robert Trowbridge
- Russell Hicks as Mr. Whitney
- Jason Robards Sr. as The Captain
- Noble Johnson as Carib (Also in archive footage from The Most Dangerous Game, in which he appeared as "Ivan".)
- Edmund Glover as Quartermaster (uncredited)

== Production ==
The film was originally called The Most Dangerous Game. Audrey Long was signed in January 1945, and Edgar Barrier joined shortly afterward. The film uses outtakes from RKO's 1932 production of The Most Dangerous Game with Joel McCrea and Fay Wray.
