= Hamilton Fish II =

American politician (1849–1936)

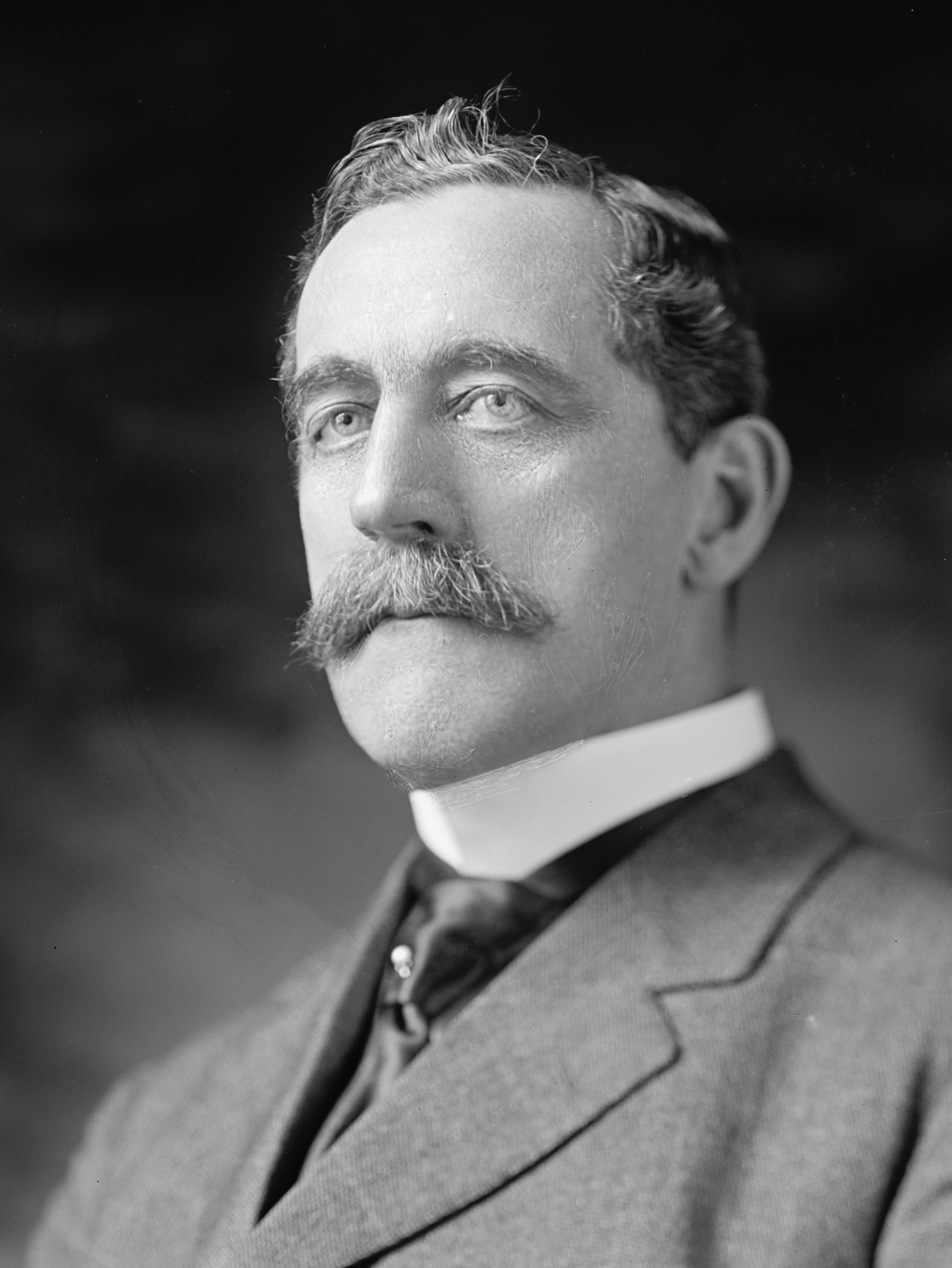
- Fish, 1905–1936

Member of the U.S. House of Representatives from New York's 21st district
- In office March 4, 1909 – March 3, 1911
- Preceded by: Samuel McMillan
- Succeeded by: Richard E. Connell

Assistant Treasurer of the United States
- In office 1903–1908
- Preceded by: Conrad N. Jordan
- Succeeded by: George S. Terry

Speaker of the New York State Assembly
- In office 1895–1896
- Preceded by: George R. Malby
- Succeeded by: James M. E. O'Grady

Member of the New York State Assembly from Putnam County
- In office January 1, 1889 – December 31, 1896
- Preceded by: Henry Mable
- Succeeded by: Emerson W. Addis
- In office January 1, 1876 – December 31, 1879
- Preceded by: William H. Christopher
- Succeeded by: George McCabe
- In office January 1, 1874 – December 31, 1874
- Preceded by: William S. Clapp
- Succeeded by: William H. Christopher

Personal details
- Born: April 17, 1849 Albany, New York, U.S.
- Died: January 15, 1936 (aged 86) Aiken, South Carolina, U.S.
- Resting place: Saint Philip's Church Cemetery; Garrison, New York
- Party: Republican
- Spouses: Emily Maria Mann (m. 1880; died 1899) Florence Delaplaine (m. 1912; died 1926)
- Children: 5 (including Hamilton Fish III)
- Parent(s): Julia Ursin Niemcewicz Kean; Hamilton Fish
- Education: Columbia College (1869); Columbia Law School (1873)

Hamilton Fish II (April 17, 1849 – January 15, 1936) was an American lawyer and politician who served as Speaker of the New York State Assembly and a member of the United States House of Representatives.

== Early life ==
Fish was born in Albany, New York, on April 17, 1849, while his father was serving as Governor of New York. Fish was the son of Julia Ursin Niemcewicz Kean (1816–1887) and Hamilton Fish (1808–1893). He graduated from Columbia College of Columbia University in 1869 and was a member of St. Anthony Hall and the Philolexian Society. He also received a Master of Arts degree from Columbia.

His paternal grandparents were Elizabeth (née Stuyvesant) Fish and Nicholas Fish (1758–1833), a leading Federalist politician and notable figure of the American Revolutionary War, who named his father after their friend Alexander Hamilton. In 1903, he succeeded his brother Nicholas Fish II as a hereditary member of the Society of the Cincinnati.

== Career ==
After graduating from Columbia, he served as private secretary to his father for two years. He then returned to Columbia and attended Columbia Law School, graduating in 1873. From 1873 to 1874 he was aide-de-camp to Governor John Adams Dix with the rank of colonel.

He was elected to twelve terms as a member of the New York State Assembly, representing Putnam County, in 1874, 1876, 1877, 1878, 1879, 1889, 1890, 1891, 1893, 1894, 1895 and 1896. He was the Republican leader in 1890 and Speaker in 1895 and 1896.

He was selected in 1903 to serve as assistant treasurer of the United States in charge of the Wall Street sub-treasury in the administration of Theodore Roosevelt. Roosevelt's first choice, Robert Bacon, declined the position. He withdrew his second choice, William Plimley, after objections from several senators and New York bank presidents to the appointment of a political aide who had no relevant experience. Roosevelt then nominated Fish, who was promptly confirmed. He resigned from the Treasury in 1908 to run for the United States House of Representatives against Andrew C. Zabriskie. He defeated Zabriskie and was elected to represent New York's 21st district and served for a single term from March 4, 1909, until March 3, 1911. He was defeated for reelection.

For many years Fish was considered to be one of the top Republican bosses in the State of New York, controlling Putnam County.

=== Congressional electoral history ===
New York's 21st congressional district election, 1908
Party	Candidate	Votes	%
Republican	Hamilton Fish II	22,832	51.99
Democratic	Andrew C. Zabriskie	19,725	44.92
Prohibition	William W. Smith	790	1.8
Independence	George Lazar	425	0.97
Socialist	George H. Warner	141	0.32
Total votes		43,913	100.00
Republican hold			

New York's 21st congressional district election, 1910
Party	Candidate	Votes	%
Democratic	Richard E. Connell	18,832	49.79
Republican	Hamilton Fish II (incumbent)	18,315	48.42
Socialist	David F. Slater	677	1.79
Total votes		37,824	100.00
Democratic gain from Republican			

== Personal life ==
In 1880, Fish was married to Emily Maria Mann (1854–1899) at St. John's Church in Troy, New York. She was the daughter of Francis N. Mann (1802–1880) and Mary J. (née Hooker) Mann (1822–1875). Before her death in 1899, they were the parents of:

- Janet Fish (1883–1970), who died unmarried.
- Julia Kean Fish (1884–1960), who married William Lawrence Breese (1883–1915) in 1908. He was killed in World War I. His older sister, Eloise Lawrence Breese (1882–1953), was married to Gilbert Heathcote-Drummond-Willoughby, 2nd Earl of Ancaster (1867–1951), and his younger sister, Anne Breese (1885–1959), who was married to Lord Alastair Robert Innes-Ker (b. 1880), the second son of James Innes-Ker, 7th Duke of Roxburghe, and a first cousin of Winston Churchill. Lord Alastair's brother, Henry Innes-Ker, 8th Duke of Roxburghe, also married an American, Mary Goelet (1878–1937), the daughter of the New York real-estate millionaire Ogden Goelet. His younger brother, Lord Robert Edward Innes-Ker (1885–1958), married the actress José Collins.
- Emily Rosalind Fish (1886–1975), who married John Wilson Cutler (1887–1950), an investment banker, in 1910.
- Hamilton Stuyvesant Fish III (1888–1991), also a U.S. Representative, who married Grace Chapin Rogers (1885–1960), daughter of Brooklyn Mayor Alfred C. Chapin in 1921. After her death in 1960, he married Marie Blackton in 1967. After her death in 1974, he was married to Alice Desmond from 1976 until their divorce in 1984. He married for the fourth time in 1988 to Lydia Ambrogio, whom he remained married to until his death at the age of 102.
- Helena Livingston Fish (1893–1970), who married Henry Forster (1889–1989), a son of Frederick Prentiss Forster and Edith (née Allen) Forster, in 1920.

After his first wife's death, he married Florence Delaplaine (1849–1926) in 1912. Florence, a widow of both James Beekman (1848–1902), a great-grandson of James Beekman, and Gustav Amsinck (1837–1909), was the daughter of Isaac C. Delaplaine and Matilda (née Post) Delaplaine (1821–1907).

In the late 19th century, he purchased the Rock Lawn and Carriage House at Garrison, New York.

Fish died at the home of his daughter Julia, in Aiken, South Carolina, on January 15, 1936. He was buried at Saint Philip's Church Cemetery in Garrison.

=== Descendants ===
Through his daughter Julia, he was the grandfather of William Lawrence Breese Jr. (1909–2000), founder and chairman of the Longview Foundation for Education in World Affairs and International Understanding, and Hamilton Fish Breese (1910–1920).

Through his son Hamilton, he was the grandfather of Hamilton Fish IV (1926–1996), a thirteen-term U.S. Representative from New York who held office from 1969 to 1995, and Lillian Veronica Fish married David Whitmire Hearst (1915–1986), son of William Randolph Hearst.

New York State Assembly
Preceded by William S. Clapp	New York State Assembly; Putnam County; 1874	Succeeded by William H. Christopher
Preceded by William H. Christopher	New York State Assembly; Putnam County; 1876–1879	Succeeded by George McCabe
Preceded by Henry Mable	New York State Assembly; Putnam County; 1889–1896	Succeeded by Emerson W. Addis
Political offices
Preceded by George R. Malby	Speaker of the New York State Assembly; 1895–1896	Succeeded by James M. E. O'Grady
U.S. House of Representatives
Preceded by Samuel McMillan	Member of the U.S. House of Representatives from New York's 21st congressional district 1909–1911	Succeeded by Richard E. Connell
