= Samuel McMillan =

American politician (1850–1924)

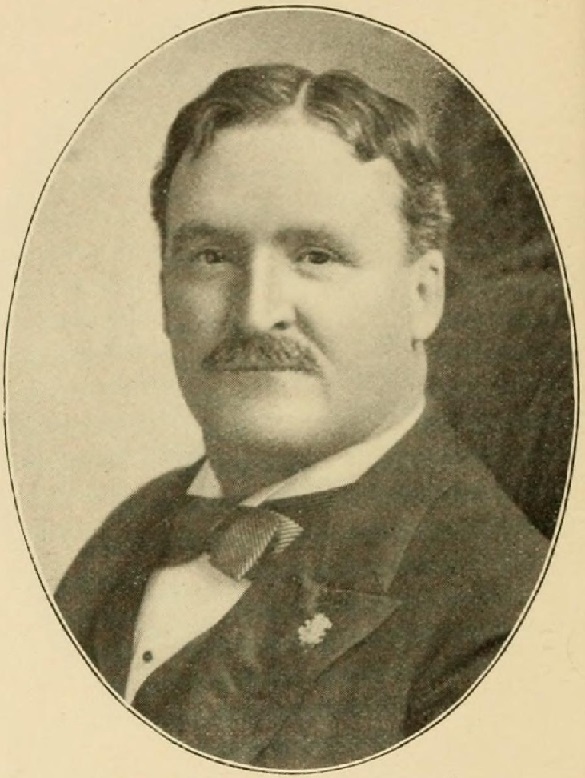
- McMillan in 1899

Member of the U.S. House of Representatives from New York's 21st district
- In office March 4, 1907 – March 3, 1909
- Preceded by: John H. Ketcham
- Succeeded by: Hamilton Fish II

Personal details
- Born: August 6, 1850 Dromore, County Down, Northern Ireland
- Died: May 6, 1924 (aged 73) New York City, U.S.
- Resting place: Woodlawn Cemetery, New York City, U.S.
- Party: Republican
- Occupation: Politician

Samuel McMillan (August 6, 1850 – May 6, 1924) was an American politician and businessman who was a U.S. representative from New York from 1907 to 1909.

== Biography ==
Samuel McMillan was born in Dromore, County Down, Northern Ireland on August 6, 1850. He immigrated to the United States with his parents, who settled in New York City and later moved to Niles, Trumbull County, Ohio. McMillan attended the schools of Trumbull County, settled in New York City, and worked as a carpenter while attending night school to study architecture, engineering and construction.

He became active in businesses in Manhattan and The Bronx, including Vice President of the Ryan-Parker Construction Company. He was Vice President of the Bronx Borough Bank and Washington Savings Bank, and member of the board of Directors of the West Side Bank and Mutual Bank of New York City. He was also involved in other businesses, including serving as President of the Pelham Park Railroad.

McMillan was also active in New York City's government. He served on the building department's board of examiners for 12 years, and was a member of the board of park commissioners and president of the board during the mayoral administration of William L. Strong.

In 1906 McMillan was a resident of Mahopac, New York when he was elected to the United States House of Representatives as a Republican, and served in the 60th Congress (March 4, 1907 - March 3, 1909). He was not a candidate for renomination in 1908.

McMillan died in New York City on May 6, 1924 and was buried at Woodlawn Cemetery in the Bronx.

U.S. House of Representatives
| Preceded by John H. Ketcham | Member of the U.S. House of Representatives from New York's 21st congressional district 1907–1909 | Succeeded by Hamilton Fish II |
