= John H. Ketcham =

Union Army general

John Ketcham
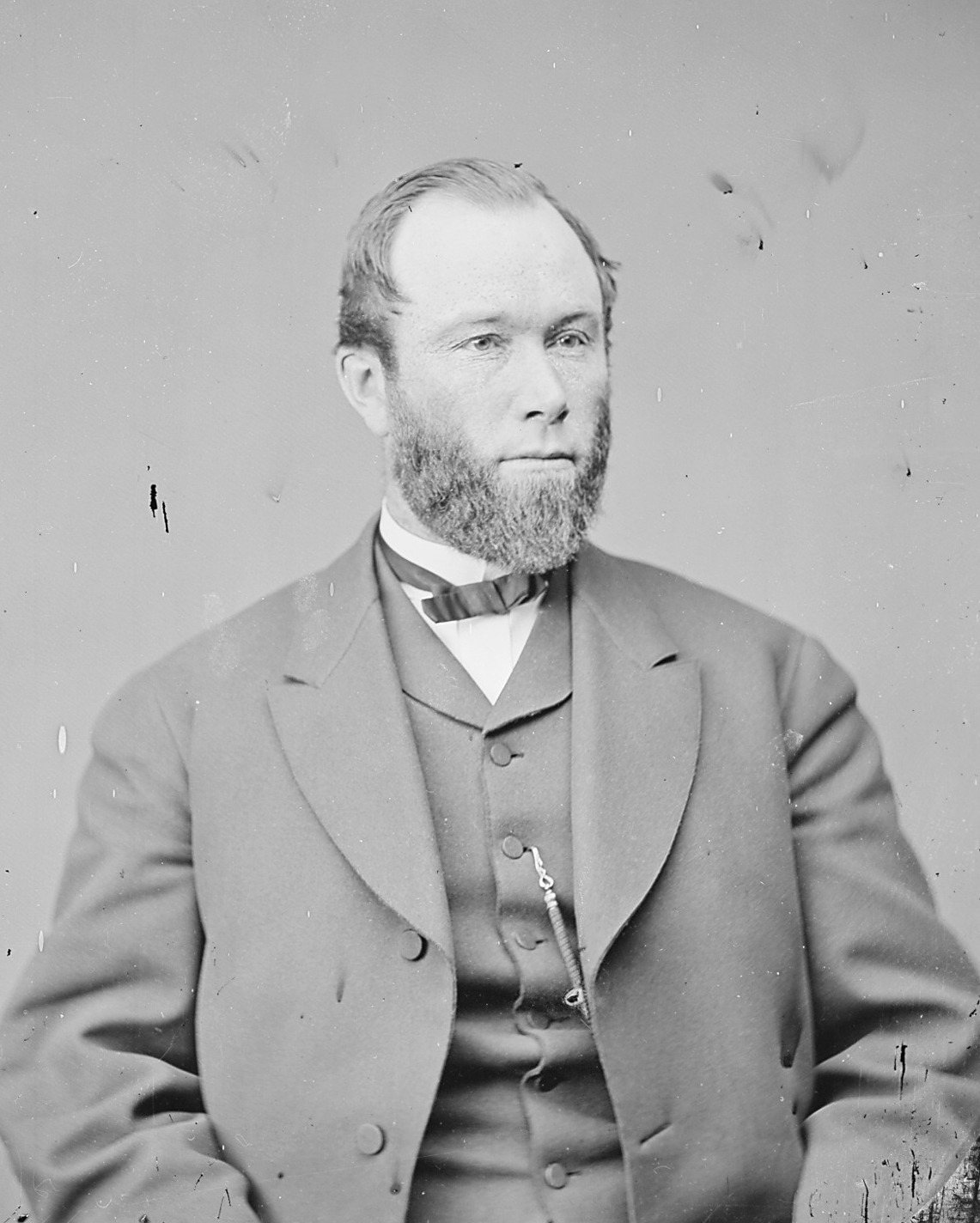
- Portrait by Mathew Brady, c. 1860–1865

Member of the U.S. House of Representatives from New York
- In office March 4, 1897 – November 4, 1906
- Preceded by: Jacob LeFever
- Succeeded by: Samuel McMillan
- Constituency: 18th district (1897–1903); 21st district (1903–1906)
- In office March 4, 1877 – March 3, 1893
- Preceded by: John O. Whitehouse
- Succeeded by: William Ryan
- Constituency: 13th district (1877–1885); 16th district (1885–1893)
- In office March 4, 1865 – March 3, 1873
- Preceded by: Homer Augustus Nelson
- Succeeded by: Charles St. John
- Constituency: 12th district

Member of the Board of Commissioners of the District of Columbia
- In office July 3, 1874 – June 30, 1877
- Appointed by: Ulysses S. Grant
- President: William Dennison Jr. (de facto)
- Preceded by: Position established
- Succeeded by: Thomas B. Bryan

Member of the New York State Senate
- In office 1860–1861
- Preceded by: Henry C. Wetmore
- Succeeded by: William H. Tobey
- Constituency: 11th district

Member of the New York State Assembly
- In office 1856–1857
- Preceded by: Albert Emans
- Succeeded by: Albert Emans
- Constituency: Dutchess County's 1st district

Personal details
- Born: John Henry Ketcham; December 21, 1832 Dover Plains, New York, U.S.
- Died: November 4, 1906 (aged 73) New York City, New York, U.S.

Military service
- Allegiance: United States • Union
- Branch/service: United States Army • Union Army
- Years of service: 1862–1865
- Rank: Brigadier General; Brevet Major General
- Battles/wars: American Civil War

John Henry Ketcham (December 21, 1832 – November 4, 1906) was an American politician and military officer who was a United States representative from New York for over 33 years from 1877 to 1893 and from 1897 to 1906. He also served as a major general in the Union Army during the American Civil War.

== Biography ==
John H. Ketcham was born in Dover Plains, New York on December 21, 1832. He pursued an academic course and graduated from Suffield Academy at Suffield, Connecticut. He then became interested in agricultural pursuits, as well as politics. He was Supervisor of the Town of Dover in 1854 and 1855; a member of the New York State Assembly (Dutchess County, 1st District) in 1856 and 1857; and a member of the New York State Senate (11th District) in 1860 and 1861.

With the outbreak of the American Civil War, he enlisted in the Union Army and was appointed as colonel of the 150th New York Volunteer Infantry, on October 11, 1862. Ketcham was brevetted as a brigadier general on December 6, 1864, and promoted to the full rank of brigadier general in the volunteer army on April 1, 1865. He was brevetted major general of Volunteers March 13, 1865.

Following the war, Ketcham resumed his political career. He was elected as a Republican to the Thirty-ninth and to the three succeeding Congresses (March 4, 1865 – March 3, 1873). He was the chairman of the Committee on Public Lands Forty-second Congress. He was an unsuccessful candidate for reelection in 1872 to the Forty-third Congress.

Ketcham was a Commissioner of the District of Columbia from July 3, 1874, until June 30, 1877, when he resigned. During this time, he was a delegate to the Republican National Convention in 1876. He was subsequently elected as a Republican to the Forty-fifth and to the seven succeeding Congresses (March 4, 1877 – March 3, 1893). He served as chairman of the Committee on Expenditures in the Department of State (Fifty-seventh through Fifty-ninth Congresses). Ketcham declined to be a candidate for renomination.

He re-entered politics and became a delegate to the 1896 Republican National Convention and was then elected as a Republican to the Fifty-fifth and to the four succeeding Congresses and served from March 4, 1897, until his death in New York City on November 4, 1906. John Ketcham is buried in Valley View Cemetery in Dover Plains, New York.

John H. Ketcham Elementary School in Washington, DC is named for him.

== See also ==
- List of American Civil War generals (Union)
- List of members of the United States Congress who died in office (1900–1949)

Political offices
| New office | Member of the Board of Commissioners of the District of Columbia; 1874–1877 | Succeeded by Thomas B. Bryan |
U.S. House of Representatives
| Preceded by Homer Nelson | Member of the U.S. House of Representatives from New York's 12th congressional district 1865–1873 | Succeeded by Charles St. John |
| Preceded by George W. Julian | Chair of the House Public Lands Committee; 1871–1873 | Succeeded by Washington Townsend |
| Preceded by John O. Whitehouse | Member of the U.S. House of Representatives from New York's 13th congressional district 1877–1885 | Succeeded by Egbert Viele |
| Preceded by Thomas J. Van Alstyne | Member of the U.S. House of Representatives from New York's 16th congressional district 1885–1893 | Succeeded by William Ryan |
| Preceded by Jacob LeFever | Member of the U.S. House of Representatives from New York's 18th congressional district 1897–1903 | Succeeded by Joseph A. Goulden |
| Preceded by John Stewart | Member of the U.S. House of Representatives from New York's 21st congressional district 1903–1906 | Succeeded by Samuel McMillan |
