= The Most Dangerous Game (1932 film) =

American horror film

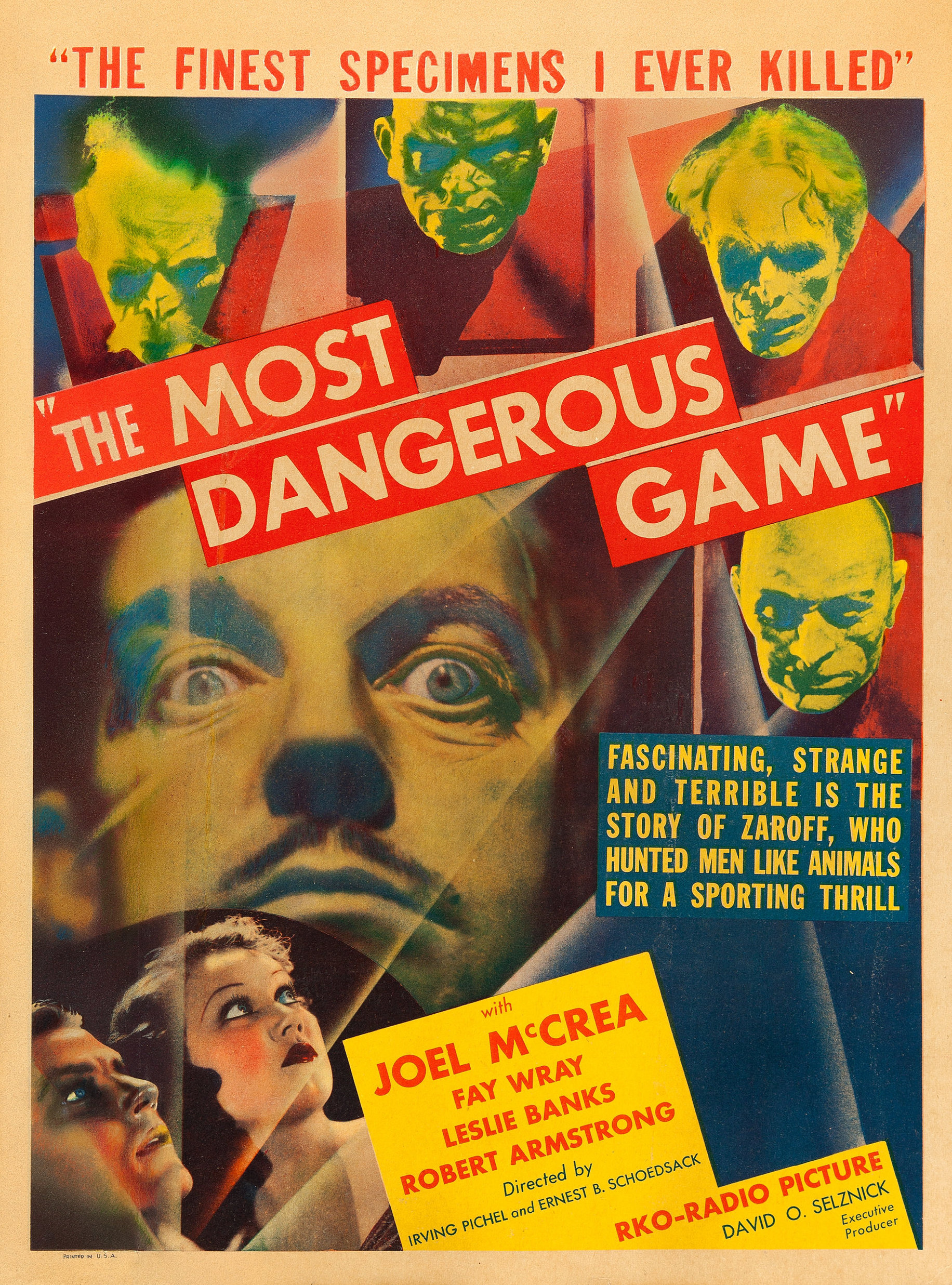
- Theatrical film poster
- Directed by: Ernest B. Schoedsack; Irving Pichel
- Screenplay by: James Ashmore Creelman
- Based on: "The Most Dangerous Game"; 1924 story in Collier's by Richard Connell
- Produced by: Merian C. Cooper; Ernest B. Schoedsack
- Starring: Joel McCrea; Fay Wray; Leslie Banks; Robert Armstrong
- Cinematography: Henry W. Gerrard
- Edited by: Archie Marshek
- Music by: Max Steiner
- Production company: RKO Radio Pictures
- Distributed by: RKO Radio Pictures
- Release date: September 16, 1932
- Running time: 62 minutes
- Country: United States
- Language: English
- Budget: $219,869
- Box office: $443,000

The Most Dangerous Game is a 1932 American pre-Code horror film directed by Ernest B. Schoedsack and Irving Pichel, and starring Joel McCrea, Fay Wray and Leslie Banks. The movie is an adaptation of the 1924 short story of the same name by Richard Connell; it is the first film version of the story. In the United Kingdom, the film was released as The Hounds of Zaroff.

The film was shot on the same jungle sets later used for King Kong, with many of the same production staff, including producer Merian C. Cooper, who directed King Kong with Schoedsack. After RKO reduced the budget and time spent shooting for The Most Dangerous Game, Cooper and Schoedsack cut down on the cast and special effects they initially planned, resulting in a shorter and more streamlined film. Most of the film was shot on a large jungle set created by Thomas Little. It had a successful release, making a profit of $75,000 in its first year. Reviews from when the film was released noted how unusual the film's subject was, with some reviews impressed by its melodrama. They praised Leslie Banks's standout performance of Zaroff, but found the other acting performances lackluster. Later reviews praised the film's chase sequences and suspense. The exploration of Zaroff's psychological motivation behind his violence—to experience excitement—was unusual for films at the time. The film also addresses the ethics of hunting.

== Plot ==
A luxury yacht is sailing through a channel off the north-eastern coast of South America. Among the passengers is big game hunter and author Robert "Bob" Rainsford. In discussing the sport with other passengers, Rainsford is asked if he would exchange places with the animals he hunts. After the yacht's owner disregards the captain's concerns about the channel lights not matching the charts, the ship runs aground, takes on water and explodes. Three passengers survive the shipwreck, but a shark attack quickly kills two passengers as they cling to the ship's floating wreckage.

Ultimately, Rainsford is the lone survivor, able to swim ashore to a small island nearby. He notices the channel lights off the shoreline change, and suspects the ship was deliberately led off course to its doom. Rainsford stumbles across a chateau where he becomes the guest of the expatriate Russian Count Zaroff, a fellow hunting enthusiast, who is familiar with Rainsford and the books he wrote about hunting. Zaroff says four other earlier shipwrecked survivors are also his guests: Eve Trowbridge, her alcoholic brother Martin, and two sailors.

The Most Dangerous Game

Later, Zaroff introduces Rainsford to the Trowbridges, and tells them his obsession with hunting became boring until he discovered "the most dangerous game" on the island. Rainsford doesn't understand Zaroff, who fails to explain further. Eve is suspicious of Zaroff and tells Rainsford the two sailors that survived with them have not been seen since each visited Zaroff's trophy room. During the night, when Martin also vanishes, Eve and Rainsford go to the trophy room where they find the "trophies" are human heads. Zaroff appears with Martin's body. Now realizing what prey Zaroff hunts, Rainsford calls him a madman and is restrained. Rainsford refuses Zaroff's offer to join him in hunting humans, and Zaroff tells Rainsford he must be the next prey. Like those before him, Rainsford will be turned loose at dawn, given a hunting knife and some provisions and allowed the entire day to roam the island until midnight, when Zaroff will begin his hunt. If Rainsford survives until 4 a.m., then Rainsford "wins" the game and Zaroff will give him keys to his boathouse so he can leave the island. Zaroff then says he has never lost what he terms "outdoor chess."

Eve decides to go with Rainsford, and Zaroff tells Eve he will not hunt her since she is a woman; but, if Rainsford loses, she must return with him. The pair spend most of the day setting a trap for Zaroff. But, when the hunt begins, Zaroff discovers the trap and begins a cat and mouse pursuit of Rainsford. Eventually, Rainsford and Eve are trapped by a waterfall. When Rainsford is attacked by a hunting dog, Zaroff fires a shot with his rifle; both Rainsford and the dog fall off the cliff into the water below. Presuming Rainsford is dead, Zaroff takes Eve back to his fortress to enjoy his prize. However, to Zaroff's surprise, Rainsford returns to the chalet, explaining that the dog was shot, not he. Zaroff admits defeat and presents the key to the boathouse, but Rainsford discovers him holding a gun behind his back. Rainsford first fights Zaroff, then his henchmen, killing the henchmen and mortally wounding Zaroff. As Rainsford and Eve speed away in the motor boat, the dying Zaroff tries to shoot them from a window with his bow. Unsuccessful, he succumbs to his wounds and falls into the pack of his frenzied hunting dogs below, implying that he has now become their “prey”.

== Cast ==
- Joel McCrea as Robert "Bob" Rainsford, a big game hunter who is shipwrecked on Count Zaroff's island.
- Fay Wray as Eve Trowbridge, Martin's sister who becomes friends with Bob and is suspicious about Zaroff.
- Leslie Banks as Count Zaroff, an evil Count who shipwrecks Bob, Eve and Martin on the island and hunts them for sport.
- Robert Armstrong as Martin Trowbridge, Eve's alcoholic brother who is killed by Zaroff.
- Noble Johnson as Ivan, one of Zaroff's servants
- Steve Clemente as Tartar, another of Zaroff's servants
- Dutch Hendrian as Achmed
- William B. Davidson as Captain
- James Flavin as First Mate (uncredited)
- Hale Hamilton as Bill (uncredited)
- Landers Stevens as Doc (uncredited)

== Production ==
=== Development ===
James Creelman assisted in scriptwriting for both King Kong (1933) and The Most Dangerous Game. The producing team included Ernest B. Schoedsack and Merian C. Cooper, co-directors of King Kong.

The script follows the original short story by Richard Connell very closely, using complete conversations from it. In the ending of the film, Zaroff dies from a fall rather than Rainsford's hand as in the story. Creelman added Eve to the story, as well as Zaroff's interest in sexual pleasure after a successful hunt.

Originally, the film was envisioned as a relatively spectacular production with a budget of $400,000. RKO cut the budget of the film to $202,662 and limited it to a three-week shooting schedule.

=== Filming ===
The Most Dangerous Game was filmed at night on the same sets used later in King Kong (1933) and with four of the same actors, Fay Wray, Robert Armstrong, James Flavin and Noble Johnson. Shoedsack directed the scenes with actors, while Cooper directed the special effects. Twenty Great Danes were cast as Zaroff's dogs. Five had special training for film chase scenes, but despite this, one dog bit Leslie Banks during filming. The dog's trainer, Johnson, was cast as Zaroff's servant.

Efforts to conform to the film's budgetary limits were most apparent in a drastically scaled-down shipwreck sequence and in the size of the cast itself, trimmed nearly in half merely by virtue of eliminating nine of said shipwreck's victims, who had already been cast. The final 70-second shipwreck sequence contained 25 shots and is a "striking" example of a montage for the early talkie era. During filming for The Most Dangerous Game, Cooper produced the test reel for King Kong, leading to an incorrect assumption that the two films were produced at the same time.

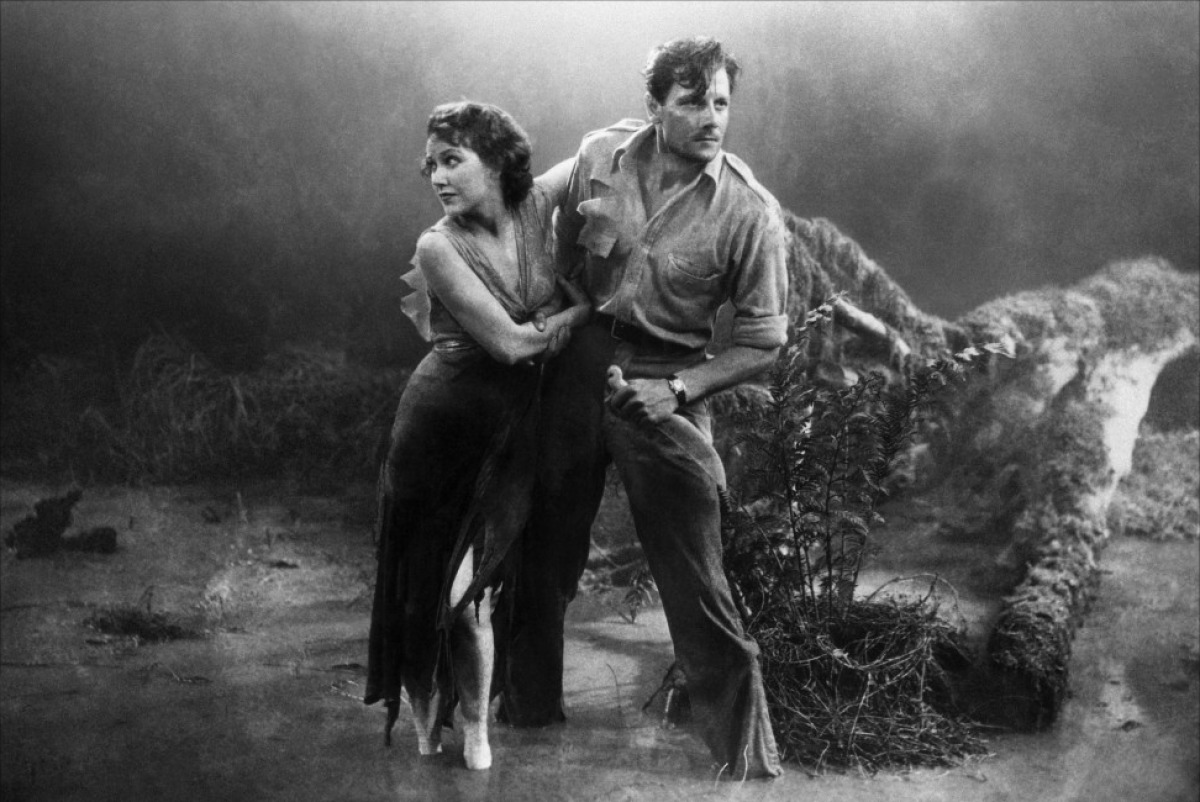
Fay Wray and Joel McCrea in a scene from the film

Carroll Clark directed the art, and Thomas Little (uncredited) created the sets. The jungle set was built in a large tank that was 15 inches (38 cm) deep. The sets for the waterfall and rapids were built on a separate stage. Location shots were done at Southern California beaches. Redondo beach provided cliffside sea shots, while a beach near San Pedro was the site of the rocky beach shots where Rainsford swims ashore. Nicholas Musuraca, famous for his film noir style, photographed location scenes and some special effects scenes with glass and process plates. Mario Larrinaga painted glass paintings for buoy lights and night sky shots. The footage of sharks eating meat with blood streaming from their mouths from the shipwreck were taken from Bird of Paradise. Traps in the film were based on real traps Schoedsack learned to use in Thailand.

Henry W. Gerrard oversaw cinematography. Robert De Grasse, on second camera, recorded the entire film from angles very similar to Gerrard's in order to have a high-quality similar copy for European distribution. This was necessary because duplicates of films were often poor. Russell Metty, who later directed cinematography on films such as Bringing Up Baby, was part of the first camera team.

Shoedsack and Cooper wanted a fast-paced film. To ensure that scenes did not drag, Schoedsack timed scene takes, often speeding up a scene for its final take. Irving Pichel assisted in directing the dialogue. Two Russian language experts worked with Banks to ensure that his Russian and Russian accent were correct.

=== Score ===
Max Steiner, then musical director at RKO, initially commissioned W. Franke Harling to write the score, which he did. Cooper complained that Harling's score sounded too much like a Broadway show, and Steiner composed the score heard in the final film. Steiner's score uses a hunting call as a recurring motif. Steiner's score is absent in the yacht and shipwreck scenes, creating a contrast to scenes on the island. Three different motifs are associated with Zaroff: the hunting call, the Russian waltz, and a "loping, syncopated motif" that represents his "barbarism." The final chase scene incorporates all three themes. At the end the film, the door viewers saw at the beginning closes. Here Steiner reprised the waltz and Zaroff themes in a major key. Scoring and recording the soundtrack cost $13,720.54, significantly over the $5,900 budget for the soundtrack. The music was re-used in other RKO releases.

== Release ==
The Most Dangerous Game was released in the United States on September 16, 1932.

=== Reissues and home media ===
In the British release, the film was renamed The Hounds of Zaroff. A 1938 reissue was renamed Skull Island. The brief shark scenes were turned into negatives for the reissue when their regular footage was deemed too gruesome.

In 1999, The Criterion Collection released a restored DVD featuring an audio commentary by film historian Bruce Eder.

Eureka Entertainment issued a Blu-ray edition of the film in the United Kingdom on October 22, 2022.

== Reception ==
=== Box office ===
The film made a profit of $75,000 during its first year of release. It grossed $443,000 on a $219,000 budget. The discrepancies between these figures are because the cost of distribution was not included in the budget for the production of the film. Editor Archie Marshek reported that people walked out of the film most often in two places: during the trophy room scene with the head floating in a jar, and when McCrea breaks a man's back. Parts of the trophy room sequence, where Zaroff explained how he killed two stuffed human "trophies," were cut before release.

=== Critical reviews ===
At the time of The Most Dangerous Game's release, critic Mordaunt Hall wrote in the New York Times that it was a "highly satisfactory melodrama" with "originality, which, [...] compensates for some of its gruesome ideas and its weird plot." Hall praised the performance of Leslie Banks, stating that he overshadowed the other actors. At Motion Picture Herald, Leo Meehan called it a "shocker picture" but "radically different from any of the others", with "the feeling of an oldtime serial, all boiled down and packed into one feature film." Joe Bigelow, writing under the name "Bige" at Variety wrote that the film was a "would-be thriller whose efforts at horrifying are not very effective." He criticized the acting as well, writing that McCrea was "too cool amidst all the excitement," and that Wray "had no opportunity to be anything but decorative."

Decades later, author and film critic Leonard Maltin gave the film three out of four stars, calling it "a vivid telling of Richard Connell's oft-filmed story", while British critic and encyclopaedist Leslie Halliwell likewise awarded three stars, deeming the film a "dated but splendidly shivery melodrama with moments of horror and humor and mystery, and a splendidly photographed chase sequence". British magazine Time Out gave the film a positive review, praising the film's acting, and suspense, calling it "one of the best and most literate movies from the great days of horror". Writing at American Cinematographer in 1997, George E. Turner called the cinematography in The Most Dangerous Game a tour de force. He noted the standout performance from Banks as Zaroff whose twisted hobby becomes "disturbingly evident". In a book on films about hunting, a genre The Most Dangerous Game started, Bryan Senn praised Creelman's adaptation. Senn wrote that the film avoids any actual romance plot, which would be implausible, and improves upon the dialogue in Connell's original story. Senn praised the film's use to subjective camera, where a mobile camera shows the point of view of the fleeing Rainsford and Eve. Despite some dated slang, Senn called the film a "thrilling and timeless piece of cinema history".

=== Themes ===
Zaroff's connection of the thrill of murder to the thrill of love was unusual for the time. At one point, Zaroff states: "One passion builds upon another. Kill, then love! When you have known that, you have known ecstasy!" Cooper's biographer classified the movie as a psychological thriller. In an audio commentary, film scholar Bruce Eder discussed how unusual the exploration of Zaroff's pathology was for a film made before World War II. Eder called The Most Dangerous Game The Silence of the Lambs of its era. Both films delineated the thought process in a serial killer's mind, who seeks out and kills victims in a ritualistic way. Zaroff mentions his own war injuries in a disconnected way. The film introduces the theme of sexual fetishism with the brass knocker on Zaroff's door in the shape of a centaur holding a woman. Using the knocker requires picking up the body of the woman. When Zaroff first appears in the film, a large tapestry of a satyr holding a half-naked woman is his backdrop. This introduction foreshadows Zaroff's identification with the "brutal, amorous satyr." Eder and Senn argued that Zaroff's mentions of ecstasy and passion for love building after killing, with scenes where he and the presumed subject (Eve) appeared in the same scene, probably wouldn't have been allowed after the enforcement of the Hays Code some 18 months after the film was published.

The character of Martin, Eve's brother, is unattractively drunk. According to Eder, Cooper's support of prohibition is reflected in the way other characters negatively react to his drunkenness. Cooper and Schoedsack also didn't like it when people hunted for sport; the film's treatment of hunting reflects that dislike. When Zaroff chases humans for the thrill of the it shows Zaroff's interest in hunting as sadistic. Rainsford feels empathy for the hunted; when he is chased up a tree by dogs, he reflects that he now knows how the animals he hunted felt when he cornered them.

== Influence ==
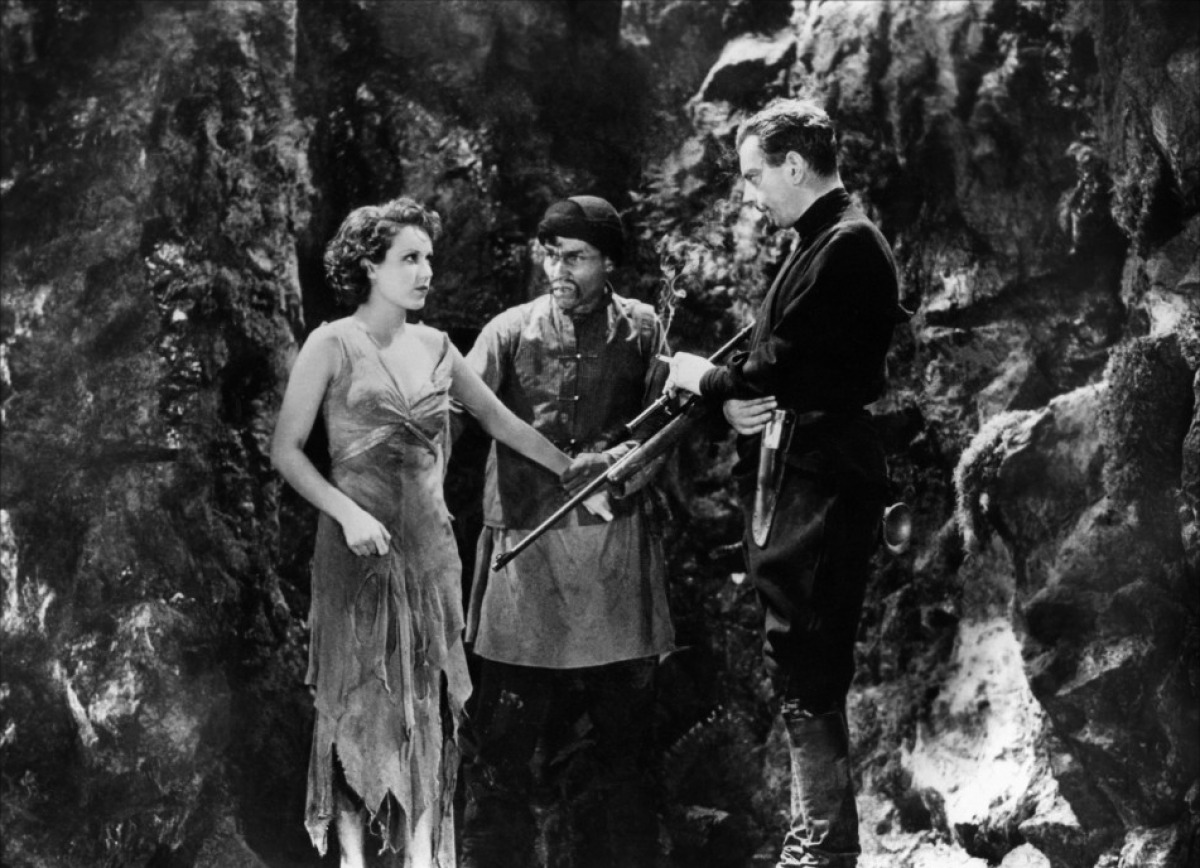
(L-R) Fay Wray, Steve Clemente, and Leslie Banks

Parts of the 1932 film were included in RKO's remake of the story in A Game of Death (1945). Noble Johnson reprises his role of Zaroff's servant.

Some shots in Dr. Cyclops (a film also directed by Schoedsack) have a composition very similar to shots in The Most Dangerous Game, notably, the scenes where the villain pursues people in the jungle and comes back with a dog.

The 1932 film may have influenced the Zodiac Killer, because in one of his coded messages, he called man "the most dangerous animal of them all."

== See also ==
- Apocalypto, about Mayans engaging in human sacrifice and manhunts
- Bloodlust!, a similar-themed film
- The Hunt, a similar film
- The Pest, a comedy with a similar plot
- Predator (film), a similar film, same jungle terrain, man as prey
- Surviving the Game, a similar film
- Hard Target, the rich hunt the poor for sport
- List of films with a 100% rating on Rotten Tomatoes, a film review aggregator website

== Sources ==
- Eder, Bruce (1999). The Most Dangerous Game (audio track commentary). The Criterion Collection. ISBN 0780022114.
- Pitts, Michael R. (2015). RKO Radio Pictures Horror, Science Fiction, and Fantasy Films, 1929-1956. Jefferson, North Carolina: McFarland and Company. ISBN 978-0-786-46047-2.
- Senn, Bryan (2013). The Most Dangerous Cinema: People Hunting People on Film. Jefferson, North Carolina: McFarland and Company. ISBN 978-0-786-43562-3.
- Smith, Steven C. (2020). Music by Max Steiner: The Epic Life of Hollywood's Most Influential Composer. Oxford, England: Oxford University Press. ISBN 978-0-190-62327-2.
- Vaz, Mark Cotta (August 2005). Living Dangerously: The Adventures of Merian C. Cooper, Creator of King Kong. Villard. ISBN 978-1-4000-6276-8.
