= Richard Connell =

American writer (1893–1949)

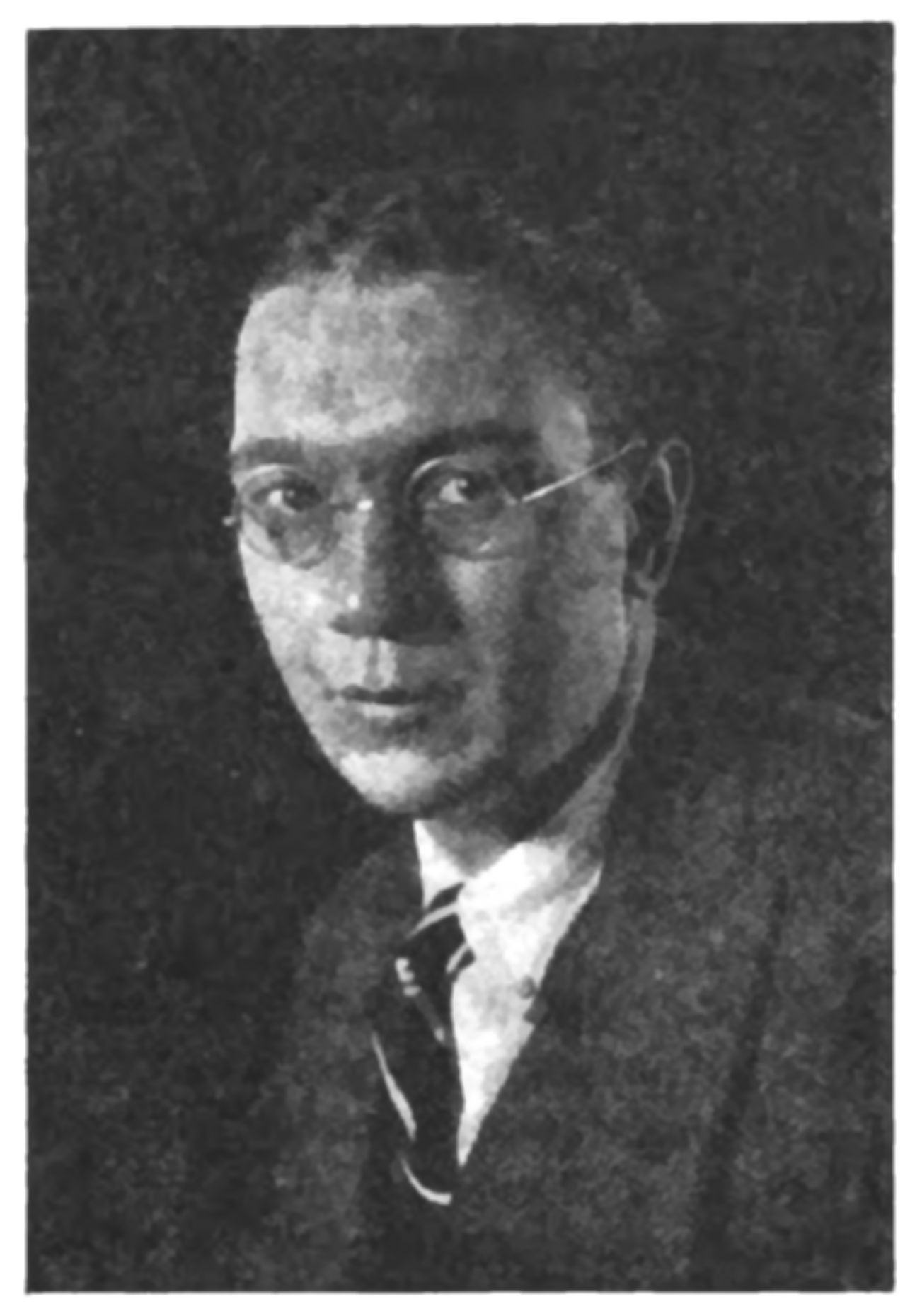
- Connell c. 1923
- Born: Richard Edward Connell Jr. October 17, 1893; Poughkeepsie, New York, U.S.
- Died: November 22, 1949 (aged 56); Beverly Hills, California, U.S.
- Education: Georgetown University; Harvard University (AB)
- Occupations: Author; screenwriter; journalist
- Notable work: "The Most Dangerous Game" (1924)
- Spouse: Louise Herrick Fox (m. 1919)
- Father: Richard E. Connell
- Awards: O. Henry Award: 2nd Prize, 1923; finalist, 1924 & 1928. Academy Awards: two nominations (Original Story, 1942; Original Screenplay, 1945), no wins.

Richard Edward Connell Jr. (October 17, 1893 – November 22, 1949) was an American author, screenwriter, and journalist. One of the most popular short story writers of his time, he is best known for his 1924 story "The Most Dangerous Game". His stories were published in The Saturday Evening Post, The Century Magazine, Collier's, and others. He had success as a journalist and screenwriter, and was nominated for an Academy Award in 1942 for Best Story for the 1941 film Meet John Doe, directed by Frank Capra and based on his 1922 short story "A Reputation".

== Life and career ==
Richard Edward Connell Jr. was born on October 17, 1893, in Poughkeepsie, New York, the son of Richard E. and Mary Miller Connell. He began his writing career for The Poughkeepsie Press (where his father was editor) and attended Georgetown College for a year before going to Harvard University, where he edited The Lampoon and The Crimson. He received an AB from the university in 1915.

Connell subsequently worked on the city staff of The New York American and as a copy writer for J. Walter Thompson. He served in France with the United States Army during World War I. While in the army, he was the editor of his camp's newspaper. After the war, he turned to writing short stories, and eventually wrote over 300. Connell also wrote four novels between 1927 and 1937.

In 1925, Connell moved to Hollywood where he began a side career writing scenarios for studios like First National, Paramount, and MGM, while continuing to write magazine fiction. During this initial period, a number of Connell's short stories were adapted into feature films, but he had no screenwriting credits as such.

Connell's first onscreen credit as a screenwriter was for The Milky Way (1936), a comedy starring Harold Lloyd, which Connell cowrote with Grover Jones and Frank Butler. After that his screenplays, mostly romantic comedies and an occasional musical, were produced steadily until his death in 1949.

In 1939, Connell worked with Robert Presnell Sr. to write "The Life and Death of John Doe," a film treatment based on his short story, "A Reputation," first published in The Century Magazine in August 1922. This was the basis for Frank Capra's film Meet John Doe (1941), and Connell and Presnell were subsequently nominated for an Academy Award for Best Original Story.

In 1941, Connell began a successful screenwriting partnership with Gladys Lehman, writing all seven of his last screenplays with her. The two received an Academy Award nomination for Best Original Screenplay for Two Girls and a Sailor (1944).

Connell married Louise Herrick Fox in 1919. He died on November 22, 1949, in Beverly Hills, California.

== Awards ==
In 1923, Connell won Second Prize of that year's O. Henry Award for his story "A Friend of Napoleon," published in the June 30, 1923 issue of The Saturday Evening Post.

Two of his later stories were finalists for the O. Henry Award, but did not win any of the three prizes:

- 1924 – "The Most Dangerous Game", Collier's (January 19, 1924 issue)
- 1928 – "The Law Beaters", Collier's (June 23, 1928 issue)

All three of these stories were included in the respective annual O. Henry Award anthologies, which included both prize winners and (non-winning) finalists. This has evidently led to confusion resulting in the latter two stories occasionally being incorrectly thought of as winners of the award.

Connell received two Academy Award nominations: Best Original Story (1942) along with Richard Presnell for Meet John Doe, and Best Original Screenplay (1945) with Gladys Lehman for Two Girls and a Sailor. Neither nomination won the award.

== Works ==
=== Short story collections ===
- The Sin of Monsieur Pettipon and Other Humorous Tales (George H. Doran Co.,1922) – also published in Britain as Mister Braddy's Bottle and Other Humorous Tales (London: Chapman & Dodd, 1922)
- Apes and Angels (Minton, Balch & Co.,1924) – includes "A Reputation" and "The Man Who Could Imitate a Bee".
- Variety (London: Leonard Parsons, 1925; NY: Minton, Balch & Co., 1939) – includes "The Most Dangerous Game".
- Ironies (Minton, Balch & Co., 1930) – includes "The Law Beaters".

=== Novels ===
- The Mad Lover (Minton, Balch & Co., 1927) ― "Connell characters, as perfect and unreal as fashion advertisements, achieve life by the sheer velocity of their improbable actions. ...Connell is a literary first cousin of both Funnyman Robert Benchley and Romancer Donn Byrne." Time Magazine
- Murder at Sea (Minton, Balch & Co., 1929) ― "Loud huzzahs for this detective story... Lots of eligible criminals and a well-bred detective." The New Yorker
- Playboy (G.P. Putnam's Sons, 1936) ― "Mr. Connell's style is patterned on the Wodehouse model, combining pseudo-pompous humor and racy slang. ...keeps to the safe and well-worn territory of clean fun and goofy comedy." New York Times review
- What Ho! (G.P. Putnam's Sons, 1937) ― "Fun -- froth -- sheer entertainment." Kirkus Reviews

=== Screenplays ===
- The Milky Way (1936) (screenplay co-author) ― with Harold Lloyd
- F-Man (1936) (story)
- Our Relations (1936) (screen story co-author) ― with Laurel & Hardy
- Love on Toast (1937) (co-author of both story and screenplay) ― with Stella Adler
- The Cowboy and the Lady (1938) (contributing writer) (uncredited)
- Doctor Rhythm (1938) (screenplay co-author) ― with Bing Crosby
- Hired Wife (1940) (screenplay co-author)
- Nice Girl? (1941) (screenplay co-author †)
- Rio Rita (1942) (screenplay co-author †) ― with Abbott & Costello
- Presenting Lily Mars (1943) (screenplay co-author †) ― with Judy Garland and Van Heflin
- Two Girls and a Sailor (1944) (screenplay co-author †) ― co-nominated for Academy Award, Best Writing (Original Screenplay)
- Thrill of a Romance (1945) (screenplay co-author †) ― with Esther Williams
- Her Highness and the Bellboy (1945) (screenplay co-author †) ― with Hedy Lamarr
- Luxury Liner (1948) (screenplay co-author †)

† With Gladys Lehman

=== Screenplays based on Connell's short stories ===
(First publication information verified via the General Fiction Magazine Index.)

- Painted People (1924, First National) ― based on "The Swamp Angel," originally serialized in Collier's Weekly over five issues, Feb. 10 - Mar. 10, 1923
- East of Broadway (1924, Associated Exhibitors) ― based on "Where is the Tropic of Capricorn??," first published in The Saturday Evening Post, November 26, 1921
- Bright Lights (1925, MGM) ― based on "A Little Bit of Broadway," first serialized in Liberty Magazine in the Sept. 6, Sept 13, Sept. 20, and Sept. 27, 1924 issues
- No Place to Go (1927, First National) ― based on "Isles of Romance", first published in The Saturday Evening Post, April 12, 1924
- Seven Faces (1929, Fox Film Corp.) ― based on "A Friend of Napoleon," first published in The Saturday Evening Post, June 30, 1923
- Dark Streets (1929, Warner Bros. Pictures) ― based on "Pat and Mike", first published in Cosmopolitan, January 1929
- New Year's Eve (1929, Fox Film Corp.) ― based on "One Hundred Dollars," which advertising at the time claimed had been published in Saturday Evening Post, but the title is conspicuously absent from the otherwise exhaustive General Fiction Magazine Index of Connell's published stories.
- The Most Dangerous Game (1932, RKO) ― based on the eponymous story, first published in Collier's Weekly, January 19, 1924. This was the first of many adaptations of the story for film, radio, and television. See Adaptations of The Most Dangerous Game.
- Brother Orchid (1940, Warner Bros.) ― based on the eponymous story, first published in Collier's Weekly, May 21, 1938
- Meet John Doe (1941, Frank Capra Productions / Warner Bros.) ― based on "A Reputation," first published in The Century Magazine, August 1922. Connell also co-wrote the adaptation treatment used for the film.
