= The Most Dangerous Game =

1924 short story by Richard Connell

- Short story by Richard Connell
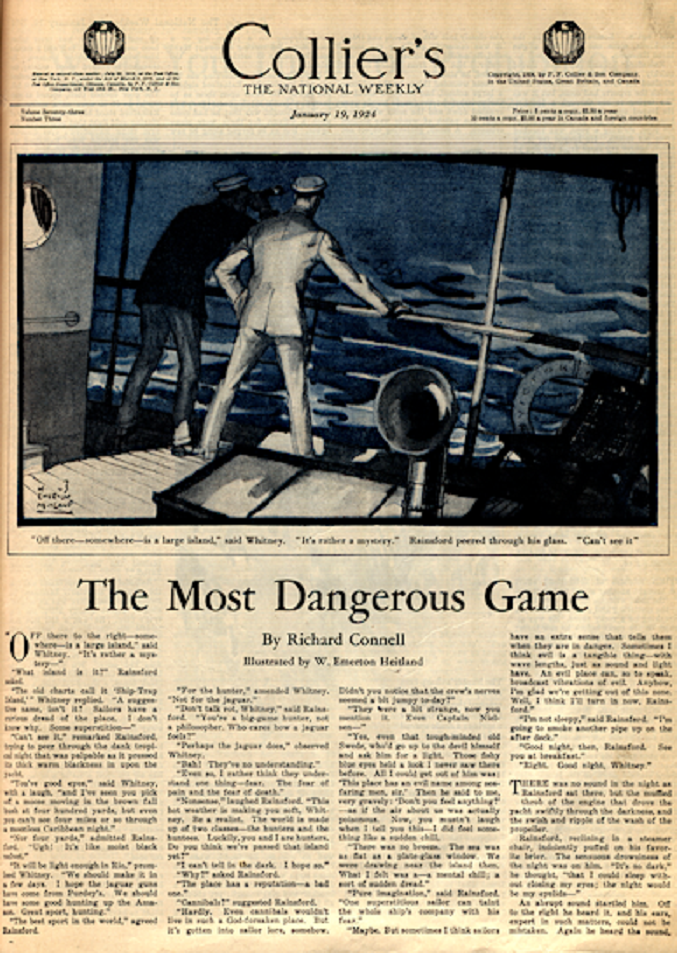
- The first page of the story in Collier's

Text available at Wikisource
- Illustrator: Wilmot Emerton Heitland
- Country: United States
- Language: English
- Genre: Adventure

Publication
- Published in: Collier's
- Publication type: Periodical
- Publisher: P. F. Collier & Son Company
- Media type: Print (Magazine)
- Publication date: January 19, 1924
- Awards: O. Henry Award

"The Most Dangerous Game" (also published as "The Hounds of Zaroff") is a short story by American writer Richard Connell, first published in Collier's on January 19, 1924, with illustrations by Wilmot Emerton Heitland. The story features an American big-game hunter who falls from a ship and swims to a mysterious Caribbean island where he is hunted by a Russian aristocrat. The story is inspired by the big-game hunting safaris fashionable among wealthy Americans in the 1920s.

It has been called the "most popular short story ever written in English" and was a finalist for (but did not win) the O. Henry Award shortly after its publication. The story has been adapted many times for film, radio, and television. It entered the public domain in the United States in 2020.

== Plot ==
Sanger Rainsford, a big-game hunter from New York City, and his friend Whitney are traveling by yacht to the Amazon rainforest for a jaguar hunt. After a discussion about the nearby Ship-Trap Island, a mysterious island in the Caribbean with an ominous reputation among sailors, Whitney goes to bed while Rainsford stays on deck to smoke his pipe. Hearing gunshots in the distance, Rainsford rushes to the rail for a better look but accidentally falls overboard. He swims to Ship-Trap Island and finds an opulent château inhabited by two Cossacks: the owner, General Zaroff, and his gigantic deaf-mute servant, Ivan.

Zaroff, another big-game hunter, knows of Rainsford from his published account of hunting snow leopards in Tibet. Over dinner, he explains that although he has been hunting animals since he was a boy, killing big game has become boring for him. After escaping the Russian Revolution, he purchased Ship-Trap Island, built a home for himself, and rigged the island with lights to lure passing ships into the jagged rocks surrounding it. He takes the survivors captive and hunts them for sport, giving them food, clothing, a knife, and a three-hour head start, and using only a small-caliber pistol for himself. Any captives who can elude Zaroff, Ivan, and a pack of hunting dogs for three days are set free, though Zaroff has never lost a hunt. Captives are offered a choice between being hunted or being turned over to Ivan, who once served as official knouter for the Great White Czar. Rainsford denounces the hunt as barbarism, but Zaroff replies by claiming that "life is for the strong." Zaroff is enthused to have another world-class hunter as a companion, suggesting that he and Rainsford go hunting, but Rainsford rebuffs him. When Rainsford refuses to see his collection of heads, citing ill feeling, Zaroff goes to hunt alone, bidding Rainsford goodnight and saying they will hunt tomorrow. The next day, Rainsford staunchly refuses to hunt and demands to leave the island, but Zaroff suggests he will be given to Ivan if he insists on refusing. Fearing this, Rainsford reluctantly accepts the challenge and receives his equipment from Ivan.

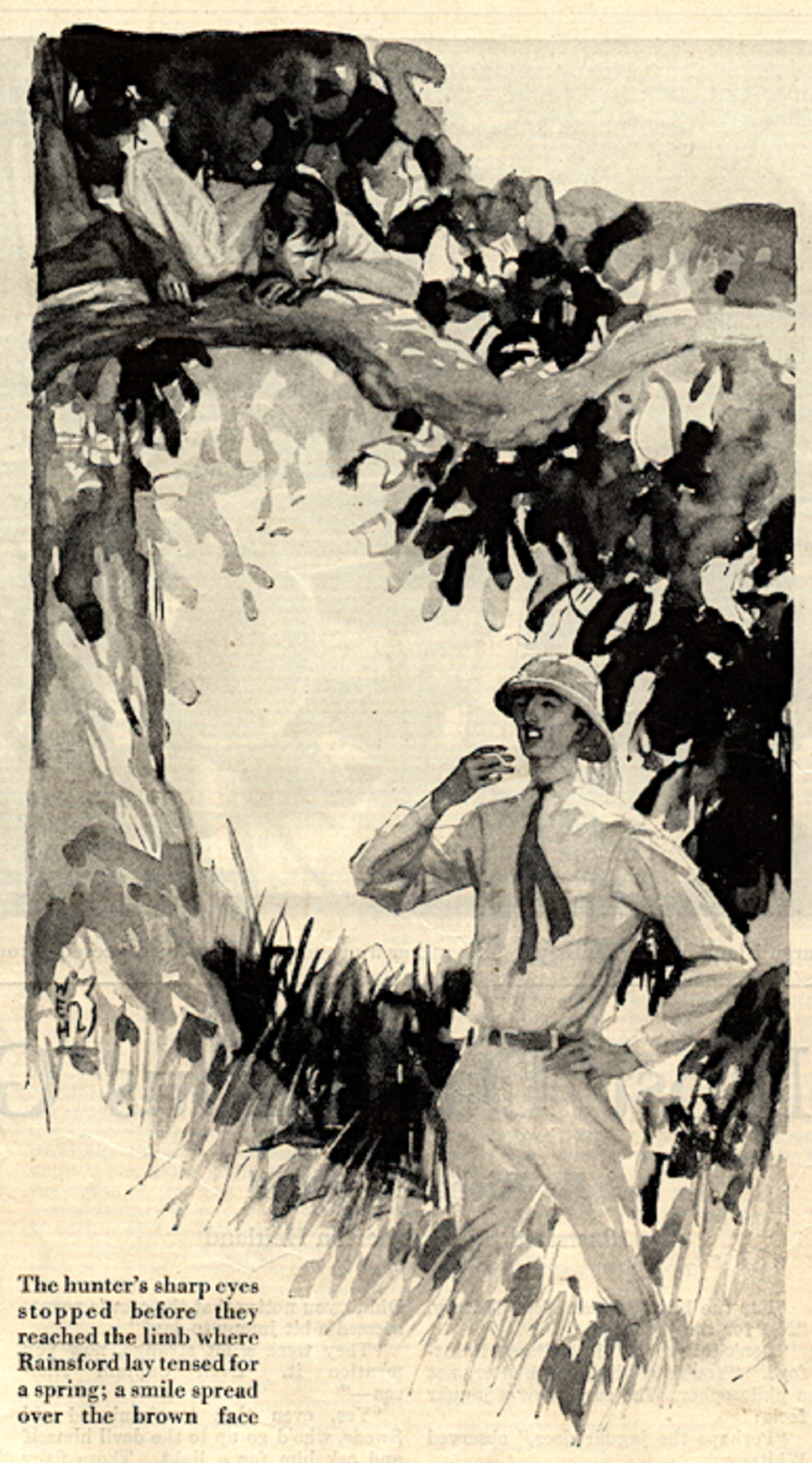
Rainsford hides in a tree from Zaroff.

During his head start, Rainsford lays an intricate trail in the forest and then climbs a tree. Zaroff finds him easily but decides to toy with him, standing under the tree and smoking a cigarette before abruptly departing. Afterward, Rainsford builds a deadfall trap consisting of a dead tree balanced against a living one. The trap injures Zaroff's shoulder, forcing him to return home, but he expresses his respect for Rainsford's ingenuity as he leaves. Rainsford next digs a trapping pit and plants sharpened stakes at its bottom; one of Zaroff's dogs falls in and is killed. The next morning, Rainsford sacrifices his knife to build a trap that kills Ivan when he stumbles into it but then dives off a cliff into the sea to escape Zaroff and his approaching dogs. Disappointed at Rainsford's apparent suicide, Zaroff returns home and settles in for the night. His relaxation is disturbed only by two thoughts: the difficulty of replacing Ivan and the fact Rainsford escaped him.

Zaroff retires to his bedroom and turns on the lights, only to find Rainsford waiting for him, having swum around the island to evade the dogs and sneak into the château. Zaroff congratulates Rainsford for defeating him, but Rainsford prepares to fight, saying the hunt is not yet over. Delighted, Zaroff responds that the loser will be fed to his dogs, while the winner will sleep in his bed. Some time later, Rainsford appreciates the comfort of the bed.

== Adaptations ==
The story has been adapted numerous times, most notably as the 1932 RKO Pictures film The Most Dangerous Game, starring Joel McCrea, Leslie Banks, and Fay Wray, and for a 1943 episode of the CBS Radio series Suspense, starring Orson Welles.
