= Joseph Harrison Jr. =

American mechanical engineer (1810–1874)

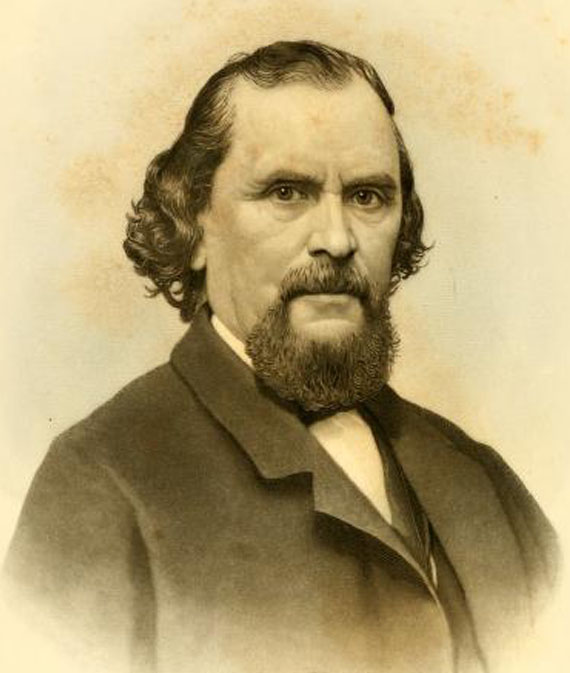
Joseph Harrison Jr., c. 1860

Joseph Harrison Jr. (September 20, 1810 – March 27, 1874) was an American mechanical engineer, financier, and art collector. He made a fortune building locomotives for Russia, and was decorated by Czar Nicholas I for completing the Saint Petersburg-Moscow Railway.

Harrison made important innovations to locomotives and steam boilers, but he may be best remembered for the art collection he amassed, that included "supreme icons of American art."

== Early life and education ==
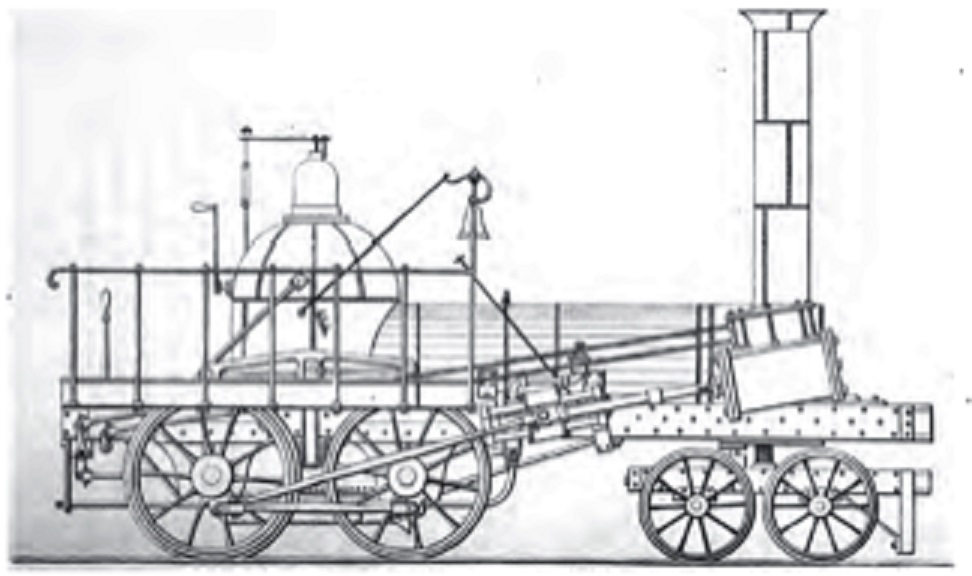
Hercules (1837), Garrett & Eastwick, Philadelphia. Harrison's driving rod directly connected the locomotive's piston (right) to its rear wheel (left).

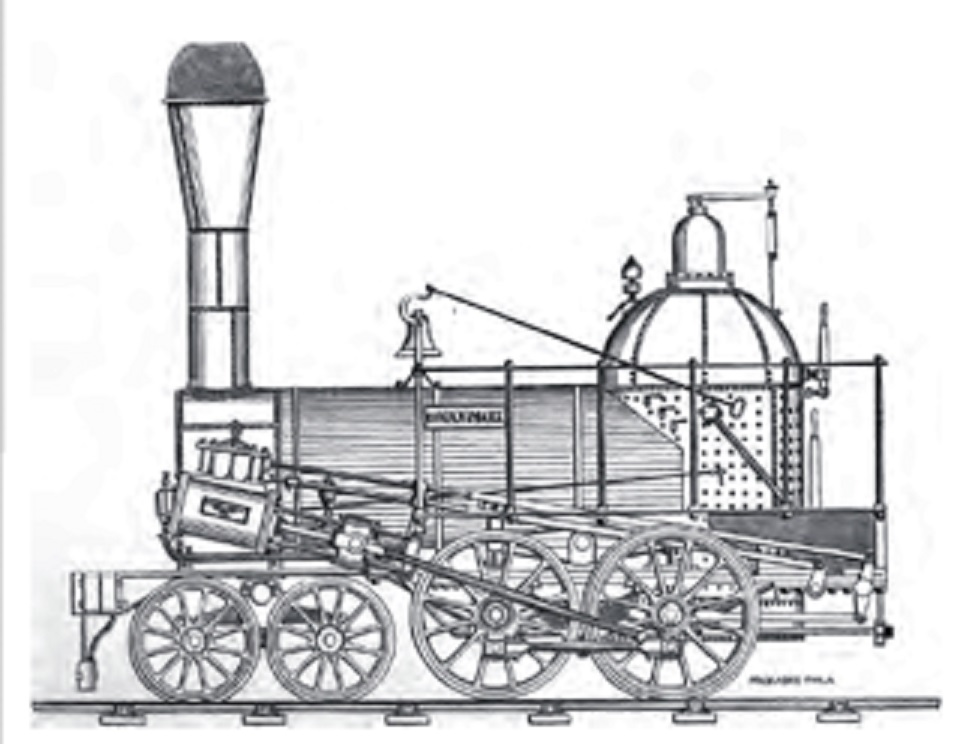
Gowan and Marx (1839), Eastwick & Harrison, Philadelphia

Harrison Jr. was born on September 20, 1810, the son of grocer Joseph Sr. and Mary Crawford Harrison. He grew up in the Kensington section of Philadelphia. He had little formal schooling, and was apprenticed to a steam engine manufacturer at age 15.

== Career ==
Harrison worked as a journeyman in machinery firms in the late 1820s and early 1830s, and was hired as foreman of the Philadelphia locomotive firm Garrett & Eastwick in 1835. Early locomotives were propelled by a pair of driving wheels. Attempts to double their tractive power by adding a second pair of driving wheels were unsuccessful, because of uneven distribution of the load between the axles. Harrison invented the driving rod, first demonstrated in the 1837 locomotive Hercules, which made twin pairs of driving wheels safe and effective.

Based on the value he brought to the firm, partners Phillip C. Garrett and Andrew M. Eastwick granted Harrison a one-third stake in Garrett & Eastwick in 1837. Upon Garrett's 1839 retirement, the firm was renamed Eastwick & Harrison. Eastwick & Harrison sold the patent for his driving rod to Baldwin Locomotive Works in 1843, and it became standard equipment in their locomotives.

=== Russia ===
Harrison designed the 1839 locomotive Gowan and Marx for the Reading Railroad. Weighing about 11 tons, it was the most powerful locomotive built to date, demonstrated by its drawing 101 fully loaded coal cars the length of the Reading's road. This feat impressed Russian engineers who came to the United States in 1841 to research American locomotive manufacturers. Czar Nicholas had ordered the building of a railroad between Saint Petersburg and Moscow, and the engineers were selecting companies to recommend for the project. In 1843, Harrison, Eastwick, and their new partner Baltimore engineer Thomas Winans, traveled to Russia and were awarded a five-year $3,000,000 contract to build rolling stock for the railway. The 162 locomotives and 2,500 freight cars were to be manufactured by Russian workers in Saint Petersburg. The railroad engineer who surveyed and laid the 400 mi (640 km) of track for the Saint Petersburg–Moscow Railway was Major George Washington Whistler, also an American. His son Jimmy, playmate of Harrison's eldest son, would become the painter James Whistler. Following Major Whistler's April 1849 death from cholera, Harrison's contract was extended, and he took over Whistler's projects.

"During the progress of this work, other orders, reaching to nearly two million dollars, were added to the original amount, including the completion of the great Cast Iron Bridge over the River Neva, at St. Petersburg, the largest and most costly structure of the kind in the world." At the November 12, 1850 opening ceremonies for the Neva railroad bridge, the Czar awarded Harrison a gold medal and other honors. Harrison and his wife and their growing family resided in Saint Petersburg from 1843 to 1850, then in Paris and London.

=== Return to Philadelphia ===
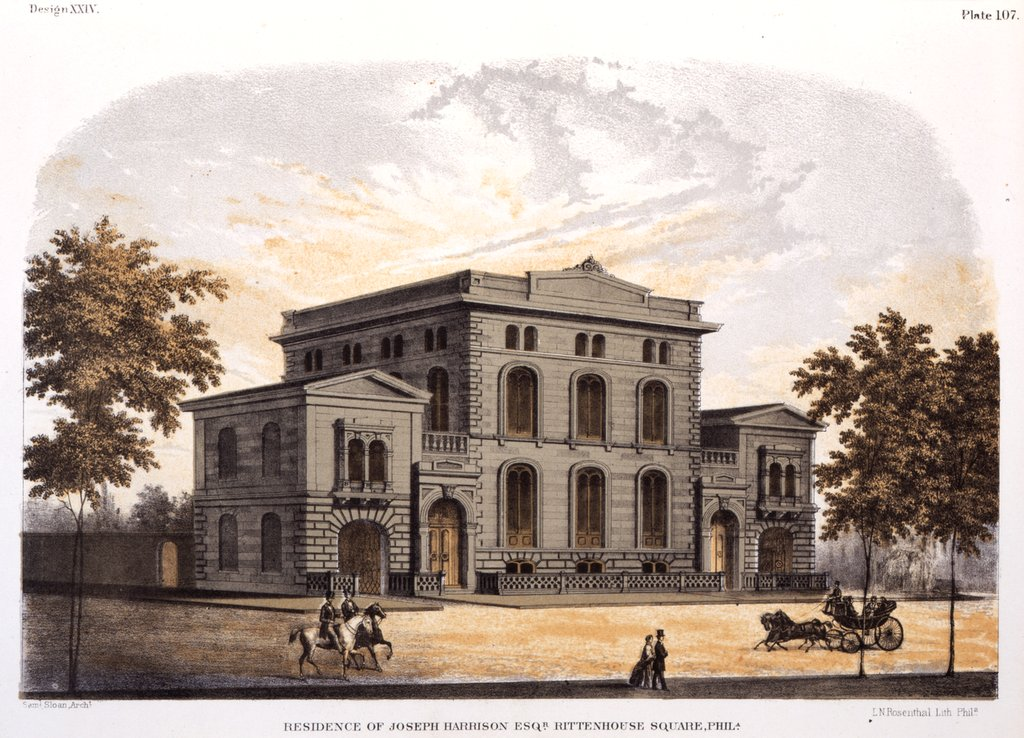

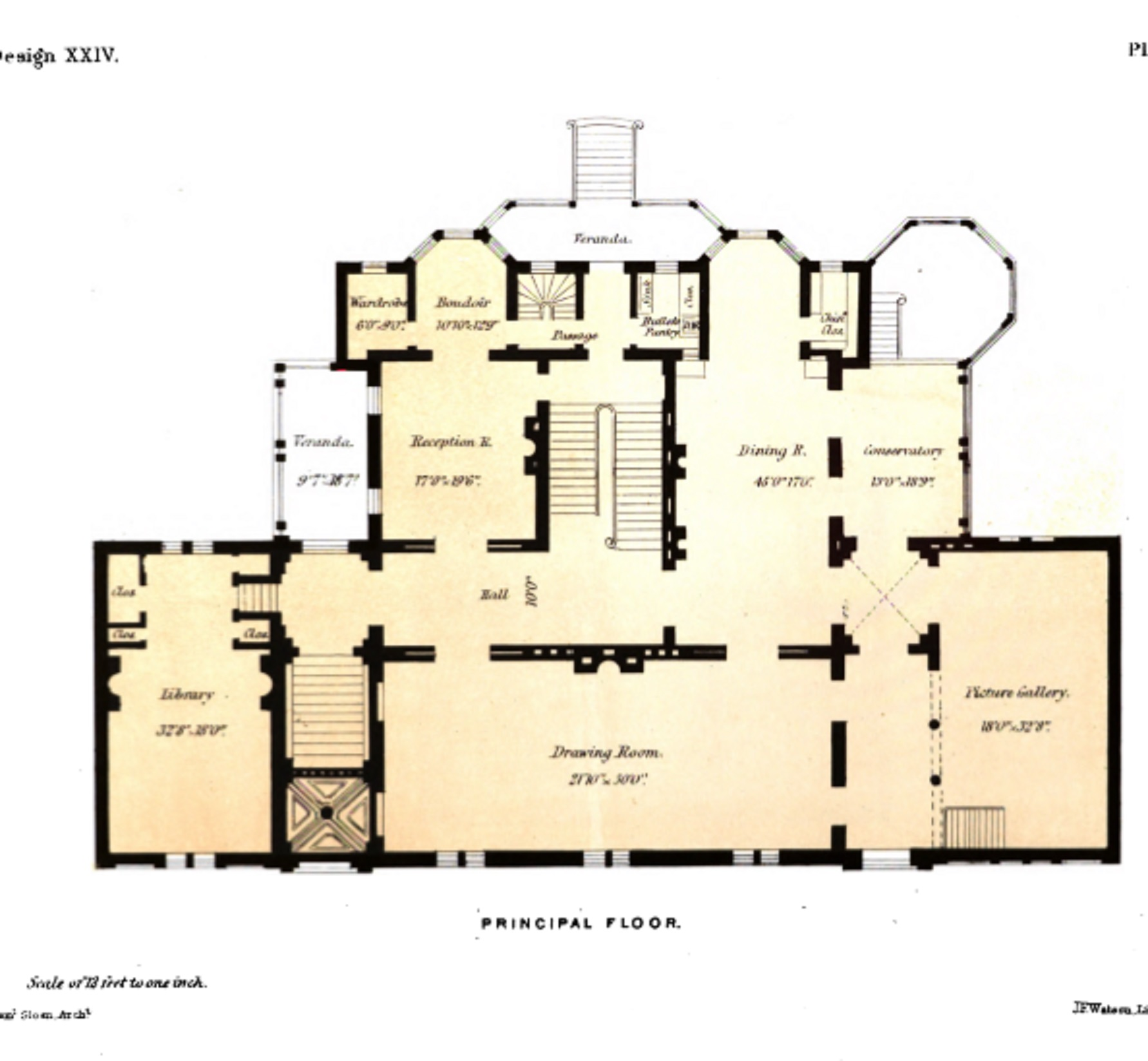
Joseph Harrison Mansion (1855-1857, demolished 1925), Rittenhouse Square, Samuel Sloan, architect

Harrison returned to Philadelphia in 1852 a wealthy man. He purchased half a city block, bounded by 17th, Locust, 18th, and Chancellor Streets with 175 ft (53 m) of frontage facing Rittenhouse Square. Architect Samuel Sloan designed him a lavish mansion at 18th and Locust Streets, inspired by Pavlovsk Palace in Saint Petersburg, Russia. Its principal floor featured a 50 ft (15 m)-wide drawingroom with three double windows overlooking the square. Also part of the project were ten luxurious rowhouses faced with stone (rental properties), that lined the north side of Locust Street and shared the rear garden with the mansion. Some of these rowhouses were later occupied by Harrison's children and their families. Construction began in 1855 and was completed in 1857.

Harrison also had Sloan design a Russian-styled dacha, or country house, in Northeast Philadelphia along the Delaware River, between Holmesburg and Torresdale. This was demolished in 1901 for construction of the Torresdale Water Treatment Plant.

Harrison invested his money in real estate, developing blocks of rowhouses in North Philadelphia, and building attractions such as Handel & Haydn Hall (1856), a concert and lecture hall at 531-547 North 8th Street.

==== Harrison Steam Boiler ====
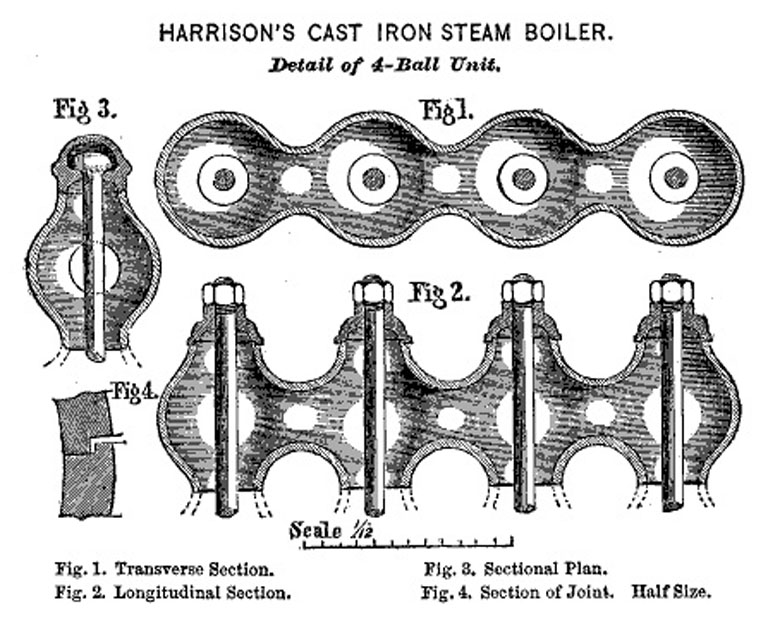

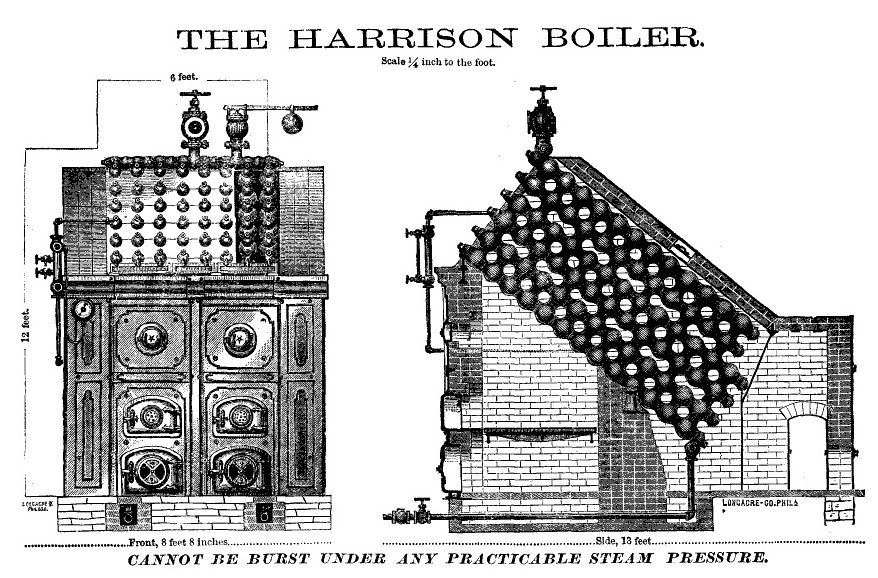
Boiler house for a 50-horse-power boiler, 152 units (608 spheres)

Harrison invented a new type of steam boiler, based upon the power of a hollow cast-iron sphere to withstand pressure. Composed of 4-sphere units that could be replaced if any individual unit was damaged, his boilers were also readily expandable.

"Early in his engineering life, Mr. Harrison's attention was directed to the means of improving steam generation, more particularly with a view of making this powerful agent less dangerous, and less liable to explosion. Mr. Harrison's first patent for the Harrison Boiler is dated October 4th, 1859, though improvements on the original idea have been the subject of several patents in this country and in Europe. At the International Exhibition, held in London in 1862, the highest class medal was awarded to this boiler, for originality of design and general merit."

Mr. Harrison's boiler is chiefly of cast iron, and is composed of many small and equal compartments. In other words, it is a combination of cast iron hollow spheres, each sphere eight inches in external diameter and three-eighths of an inch thick. This spherical form has peculiar geometrical and mechanical advantages; it is uniformly strained by internal pressure, and it is practically much stronger than a hollow cylinder of like diameter and thickness of shell. Hollow curved necks, three-and-a-quarter inches in internal diameter, make the communication between the spheres.
Four of the spheres are cast together, constituting what is called a "unit." A number of units are bolted together into a rectangular slab, and any desired number of these slabs forms the boiler, which can be increased to any extent by merely adding to its width. The slabs are placed vertically side by side, and are elevated to an angle of forty degrees at the furnace end, so as to give complete drainage at the lowest point of the slabs, and a most perfect circulation of the water in each. The water occupies [the lower] two-thirds of the slabs, while the remainder of the upper part serves as the steam space. … The feed water enters the lowest sphere in each slab, and the steam is taken off at the highest point. … The several slabs communicate laterally with each other at both their highest and lowest points. … It requires over 1,500 pounds pressure to the square inch to burst these spheres, and then the rupture is harmless [to the rest of the units].

The American Academy of Arts and Sciences awarded Harrison its 1871 Rumford Gold Medal for his safety improvements to steam boilers.

=== Personal ===
Harrison married Sarah Poulter of New York City on December 15, 1836, and they had seven children: William, Henry and Annie, born in Philadelphia; Alice, Marie and Theodore, born in Saint Petersburg; and Clara, born in Philadelphia following their return from Russia.

Buildings of the Great Central Fair in 1864

In the midst of the Civil War, Harrison chaired the Fine Arts Committee for the Great Central Fair of the U.S. Sanitary Commission. The June 7 to 28, 1864 exposition was organized to raise money for medicine, bandages and supplies for Union hospitals. Most of Philadelphia's Logan Square was covered by a temporary building, and Philadelphians lent paintings and sculptures from their private collections. "The picture gallery is nearly 500 feet long and is now hung with more than 1,000 of the finest pictures in the country. … [It] has never been equalled in modern works anywhere not even in Europe. … The Fine Arts gallery is a separate exhibition at .25 cts admission. Our rects [receipts] have been since the opening nearly $1,500 per day." President Lincoln and his family attended on June 16. Over its three weeks, the fair raised more than $1,000,000.

Harrison served as one of the ten original members of the Fairmount Park Commission, and advocated for building an art museum atop Lemon Hill (the hill behind Boathouse Row). "If we as a nation are to keep pace with the civilization and refinement of the older states of the Christian world, we too, must have our free Art Galleries and Museums, owned by, enjoyed by, and cared for by the people." In the 1920s, the Philadelphia Museum of Art was built atop an adjacent hill, Fairmount. Harrison served as a Director of the Pennsylvania Academy of the Fine Arts for fifteen years, and donated $10,000 toward construction of its 1876 building.

Following five years of a debilitating illness, Harrison died in Philadelphia, on March 27, 1874. He left an Estate valued at up to nine million dollars. Many of the most important American works in his art collection came to the Pennsylvania Academy of the Fine Arts in 1878, and more came following Sarah Poulton Harrison's death, on July 21, 1906.

The bookplate Harrison used for his library may give a clue to his personal philosophy. It featured a crane with outstretched wings, and a Latin quote from Cicero about authenticity: "Esse quam videri" translates roughly as "Be, rather than seem."

==== Benjamin Franklin ====
Harrison's personal hero was Benjamin Franklin, another inventor and self-made man, and the art collector purchased multiple portraits of the Founding Father.

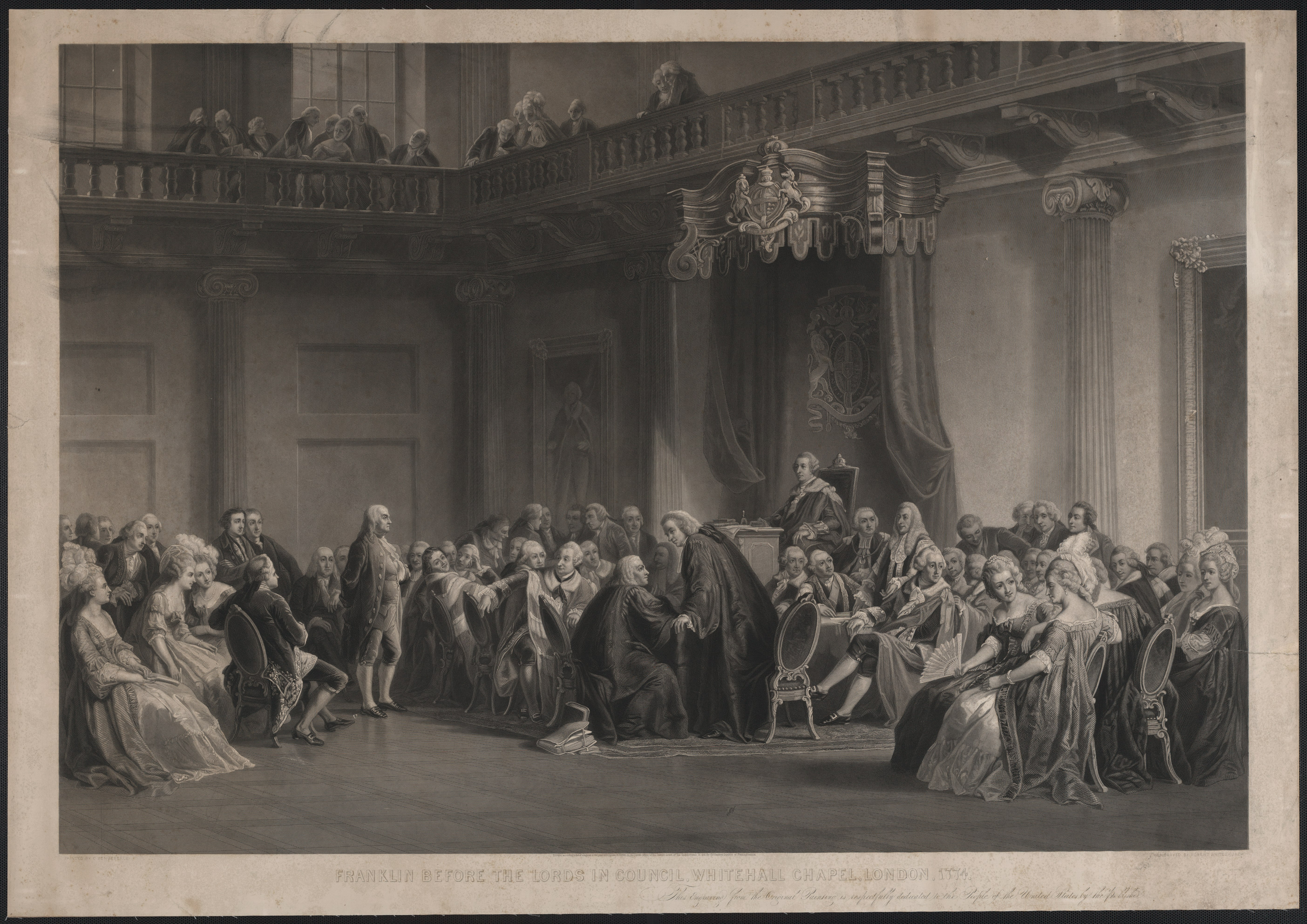
Robert Whitechurch, 1859 engraving after Christian Schussele, Benjamin Franklin Appearing before the Privy Council (1857).

On January 29, 1774, Franklin attempted to present a petition to King George III's Privy Council demanding that the Massachusetts governor and lieutenant governor be replaced. Private correspondence had leaked in which those officials discussed suspending civil liberties in the colony. Instead of a reasonable negotiation, Franklin was met with a vicious diatribe by M.P. Alexander Wedderburn, ridiculing him and attacking his character. Franklin stoically withstood the insults for more than an hour, until Wedderburn announced that he was ready to cross-examine the witness. Franklin declared that he chose not to be cross-examined, and walked out. This deliberate humiliation was a major turning point in Franklin's life, convincing him that reconciliation between America and England was impossible. Harrison commissioned artist Christian Schussele to paint Benjamin Franklin Appearing before the Privy Council (1857, Huntington Library and Museum).

Franklin co-founded the American Philosophical Society in 1743, to which Harrison was elected in 1864. The Franklin Institute was founded in his memory in 1824, to promote the sharing of scientific and technological knowledge. Harrison presented two illustrated lectures at the institute: An Essay on the Steam Boiler (January 16, 1867); and The Locomotive Engine, and Philadelphia's Share in Its Early Improvements (February 21, 1872). Both lectures were published in The Journal of the Franklin Institute.

== Art collection ==
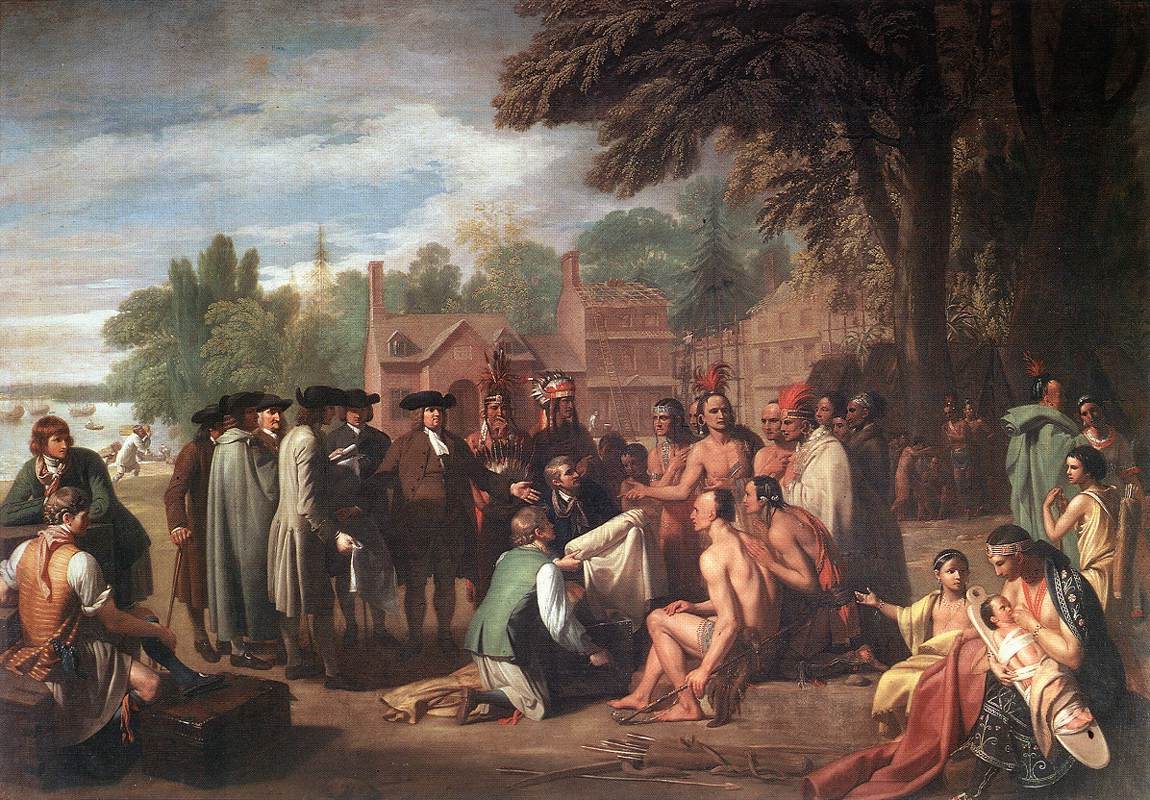
Benjamin West, Penn's Treaty with the Indians c. 1772, Pennsylvania Academy of the Fine Arts

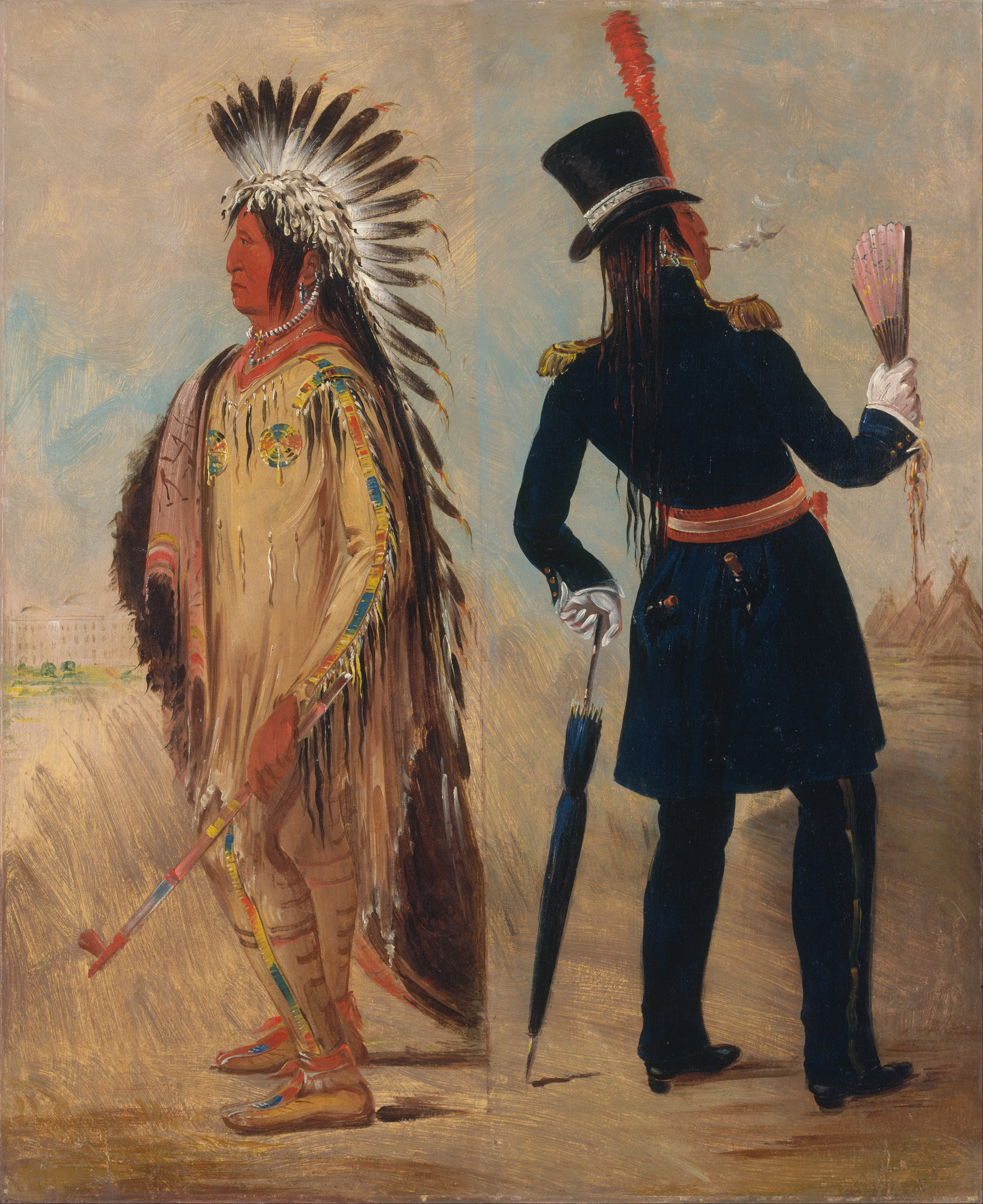
George Catlin, Wi-jún-jon, Going To and Returning From Washington (1839), Smithsonian American Art Museum

Harrison's first major art purchases were the original Vaugh Portrait of George Washington (1795), Gilbert Stuart's first life portrait of the President, and a Portrait of Benjamin Franklin (1782) by Joseph Wright, after a 1778 portrait by Joseph Duplessis. Following a months-long negotiation, Harrison purchased these in England from the estate of William Vaugh in 1851. That same year, the estate of Granville Penn (great-grandson of William Penn) put Benjamin West's Penn's Treaty with the Indians (c.1772) up for auction at Sotheby's, London, where Harrison bought it for £500 ($2,175). His agent in these purchases was the American painter George Catlin, whose Indian Gallery in London was close to bankruptcy.

Catlin was a lawyer-turned-painter, who had studied art privately in Philadelphia. In 1830, he accompanied Superintendent of Indian Affairs William Clark (of Lewis & Clark fame) on a 2,000 mi (3,200 km) diplomatic mission through the upper Mississippi, painting oil sketches of Indian life and portraits. When he returned to St. Louis, Catlin developed these sketches into finished paintings. Catlin made five additional trips over the next eight years, visiting more than fifty tribes. Beginning in 1838, he toured the eastern and central U.S., exhibiting his Indian Gallery and giving lectures. Catlin moved to Great Britain, and exhibited his Indian Gallery in London from 1839 to 1844, in Paris from 1844 to 1848, and again in London from 1848 to 1852. In 1846, he made his first attempt to get the U.S. Government to purchase the collection for the Smithsonian Institution, but Congress was hostile to the idea. (Note: "I am opposed to purchasing the portraits of savages. What great moral lesson are they intended to inculcate? I would rather see the portraits of the numerous citizens who have been murdered by these Indians. I would not vote one cent for a portrait of an Indian." — Senator James D. Westcott (Democrat, Florida), quoted in Wainwright, p. 668.) Catlin wound up deeper and deeper in debt, and in 1852, Harrison loaned him $40,000 to keep him out of bankruptcy. Harrison held the collection as collateral, and had more than 500 paintings and about 100 native artifacts shipped to Philadelphia and stored in a warehouse. Catlin was never able to repay the loan, and following the deaths of both men, Harrison's widow donated the Indian Gallery to the Smithsonian in 1879.

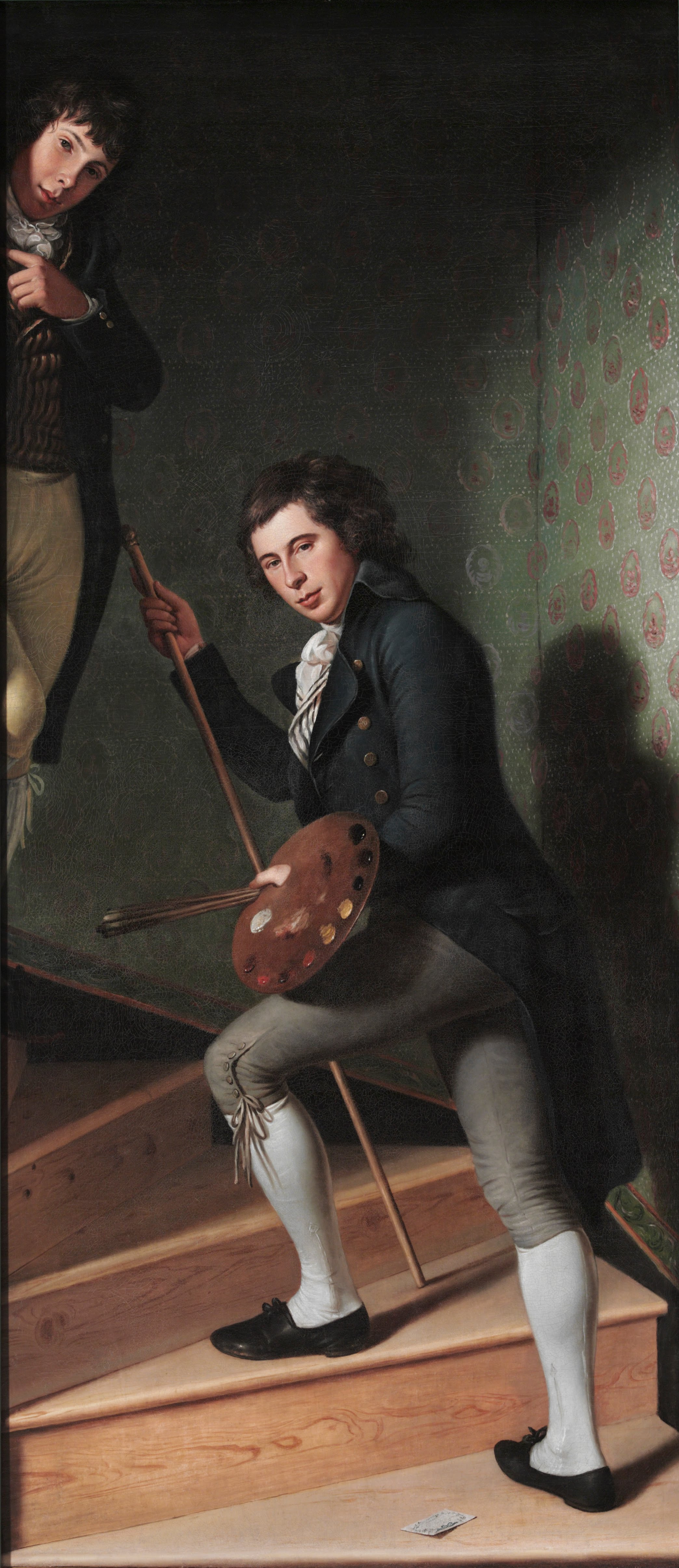
Charles Willson Peale, The Staircase Group (1795), now housed in the Philadelphia Museum of Art

Harrison purchased more than twenty portraits and historical paintings at the 1854 auction of the contents of Philadelphia's Peale Museum (and at bargain prices). These included a 1787 life portrait of George Washington ($55), and a 1785 life portrait of Benjamin Franklin, both by Charles Willson Peale; Peale's 1795 Staircase Group, a double portrait of his sons Raphaelle and Titian ($175); and The Artist in His Museum, Peale's 1822 self-portrait standing on the second floor of Independence Hall ($175). Harrison purchased a "porthole" portrait of George Washington by Rembrandt Peale, along with Rembrandt Peale's portraits of Jean-Antoine Houdon ($10) and Jacques-Louis David ($10). Among Harrison's non-Peale Family purchases were three naval battle scenes of the War of 1812 by Thomas Birch.

In 1859, Benjamin West's monumental Christ Rejected (1814) – 17 ft (5.2 m) by 20 ft (6.1 m) – was offered to the Pennsylvania Academy of the Fine Arts for $4,000. Harrison was a member of PAFA's board of directors and advocated for its purchase, but the Board had recently purchased West's Death on a Pale Horse, and voted to decline the offer. Harrison tracked down the painting, and bought it for the same price. Too large for his mansion, he hung it in Handel & Haydn Hall (and left it to PAFA).

Harrison owned John Vanderlyn's sensuous nude, Ariadne Asleep on the Island of Naxos (c.1812), which had been praised in Paris, but was controversial in America. Among Harrison's contemporary works were British painter Frederick Leighton's Reconciliation of the Montagues and Capulets (1855), and French painter William-Adolphe Bouguereau's Orestes Pursued by the Furies (1862), the latter, one of the last paintings he purchased.

Harrison's art collection exceeded 400 paintings and sculptures (excluding the Indian Gallery), and he privately published an 1870 catalogue. He had written earlier about feeling a "sense of duty" to create a permanent collection for his native city.

=== Auctions ===
Gilbert Stuart, Vaughn portrait of George Washington (1795), National Gallery of Art

After bequests, the remainder of Harrison's art collection was auctioned in Philadelphia over two sales: a three-day sale, February 23, 24 & 25, 1910; and a final sale two years later, March 12, 1912 (postponed from February 26, because of weather). The 1912 sale featured the most important paintings and sculptures, and ended with a surprise.

The star attraction of the 1912 sale was Gilbert Stuart's 1795 Vaughn portrait of George Washington. Philadelphia had served as the temporary national capital during the 1790s, and in November 1794 Stuart wrote to his uncle of his upcoming arrival: "The object of my journey is only to secure a picture of the President, & finish yours." Stuart was introduced to President Washington in December 1794, but had to wait until the following September for a sitting. According to Rembrandt Peale, the President granted a single joint sitting to Stuart and him "in the Autumn of 1795." John Vaughn was a British-born Philadelphia businessman, one of at least thirty-two subscribers who had ordered portraits of Washington from Stuart. Vaughn's order had been for two portraits; he kept Stuart's first replica for himself, and shipped Stuart's original to England as a gift to his father. Stuart was not wholly satisfied with the Vaughn portrait, but still painted between twelve and sixteen replicas. "The Stuart painting was characterized by Rembrandt Peale as the best portrait of Washington ever made."

In the 56-lot auction, the Vaughn portrait was Lot #30. "Bidding was started, at $1,000, by Percy Sabin, a New York dealer, and leaped upward in $1,000 bounds. Sabin dropped out after $10,000 had been offered, but other dealers forced the price $6,000 higher. Mr. Clarke met every rise with another, apparently determined to gain possession of the noted canvas at any cost. When he finally was successful, rival bidders loudly applauded, and scores of persons crowded around him to offer congratulations." Thomas B. Clarke was a New York art dealer who assembled a distinguished collection of American historical paintings. His bid of $16,100, set a record for an American painting at auction. Clarke and his heirs owned the Vaughn Portrait from 1912 to 1936, when his Estate sold it to Andrew Mellon, for the National Gallery of Art.

The 1912 auction surprise:

Immediately after the celebrated painting had been knocked down, William E. Elliott, one of the executors of the estate of Mrs. Sarah Harrison, stopped the sale with the announcement that sufficient money had been realized to fulfill the bequests of Mrs. Harrison's will, and that the remainder of the collection will be presented to the [Pennsylvania] Academy of the Fine Arts. Among the noted pictures thus saved to Philadelphia are two other portraits of Washington, by Rembrandt Peale and Charles W. Peale, and one of Franklin by Charles Peale.

=== The Iron Worker ===
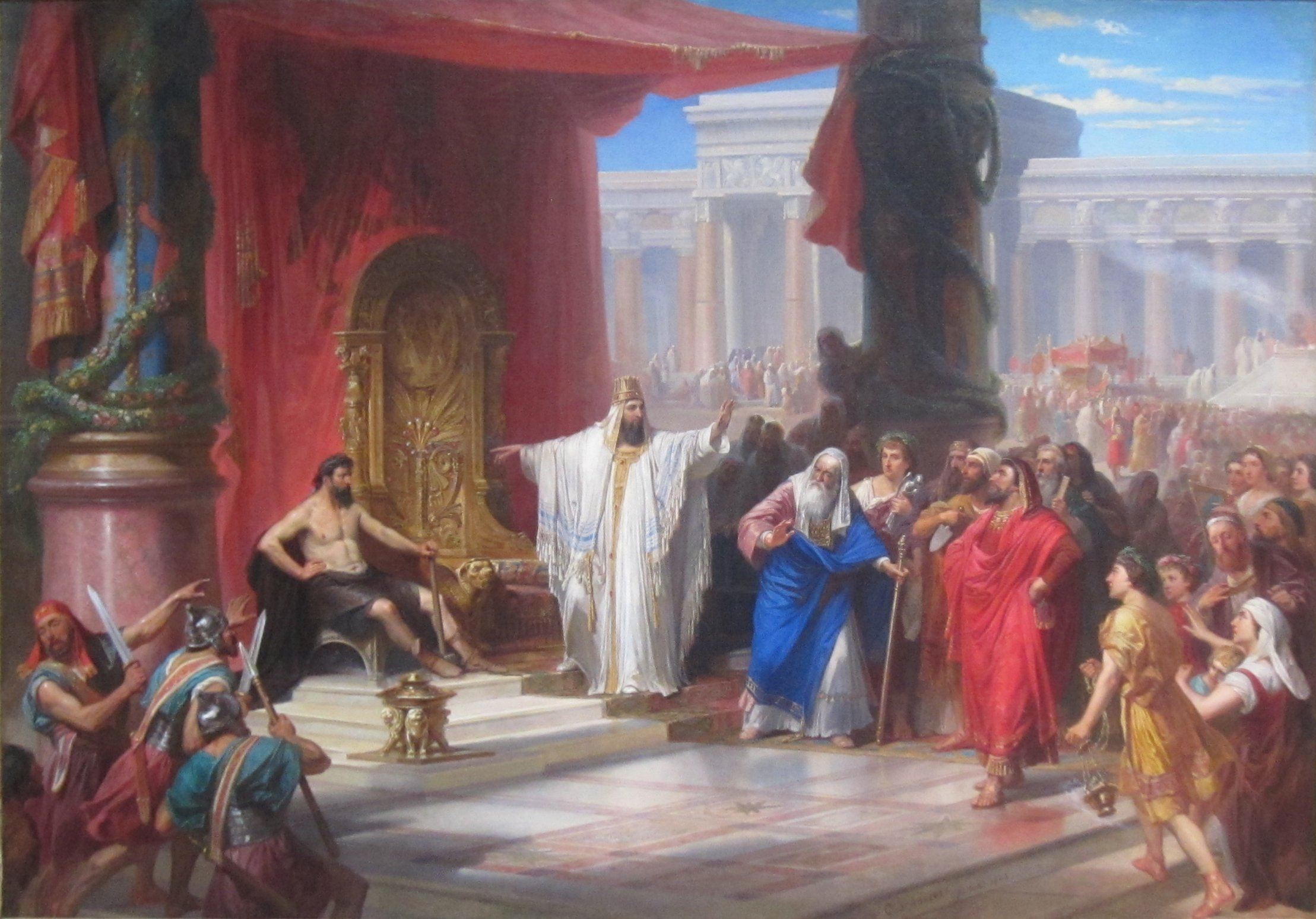
Christian Schussele, The Iron Worker and King Solomon (1863), Pennsylvania Academy of the Fine Arts

Perhaps the painting most personal to Harrison was The Iron Worker and King Solomon (1863). (Note: Art historian Sue Himelick Nutty finds striking compositional similarities between Benjamin West's Christ Rejected and Schussele's The Iron Worker. Harrison purchased the West painting four years prior to commissioning the latter, and Christ Rejected hung in Philadelphia's Handel & Haydn Hall during the three years that Harrison and his family lived in England.)

It was based on a rabbinical legend about dedication day of King Solomon's Temple. The King has invited the artisans who have built and decorated the Temple to sit with him—the architect, the surveyor, the chief carpenter, the chief mason, etc. As the King and the richly dressed artisans approach the throne, they encounter a bare-chested iron worker. When each artisan angrily demands that the iron worker leave, he quietly asks, "Who made the tools that made your work possible?" The King listens as each artisan answers, "The iron worker." When all have answered, King Solomon agrees that the iron worker has made a major contribution to the Temple, and invites him to sit at his right hand.

In late 1860, Harrison commissioned Christian Schussele to paint a major work based on the legend. Harrison and his family spend the next three years in London, and the painting was completed in early 1863. The Harrisons returned to Philadelphia that autumn, and took possession of it. He hired artist John Sartain to create an oversized engraving of the painting, which greatly popularized the legend. Harrison was never a Mason (although Sartain was), and the engraving (and legend) became strongly associated with American Freemasonry.

The painting inspired Harrison to write an extended poem (of the same title), and to invite others to write about the legend. He gathered these in a privately printed book, along with memoirs of his years spent in Russia, and gave copies to his children and grandchildren at Christmas 1867. The lesson he hoped to instill in his family members was respect for the craftsman — "the value of what is but too frequently thought to be very humble labor."

Art historian Sue Himelick Nutty, wrote her dissertation about Harrison and his art collection. She calls him "the leading Philadelphia art collector from the 1850s until his death at sixty-three in 1874." Her conclusion about the painting? "It is an allegorical portrait of Harrison: Harrison is the Iron Worker."

=== Artworks formerly in the Harrison Collection ===
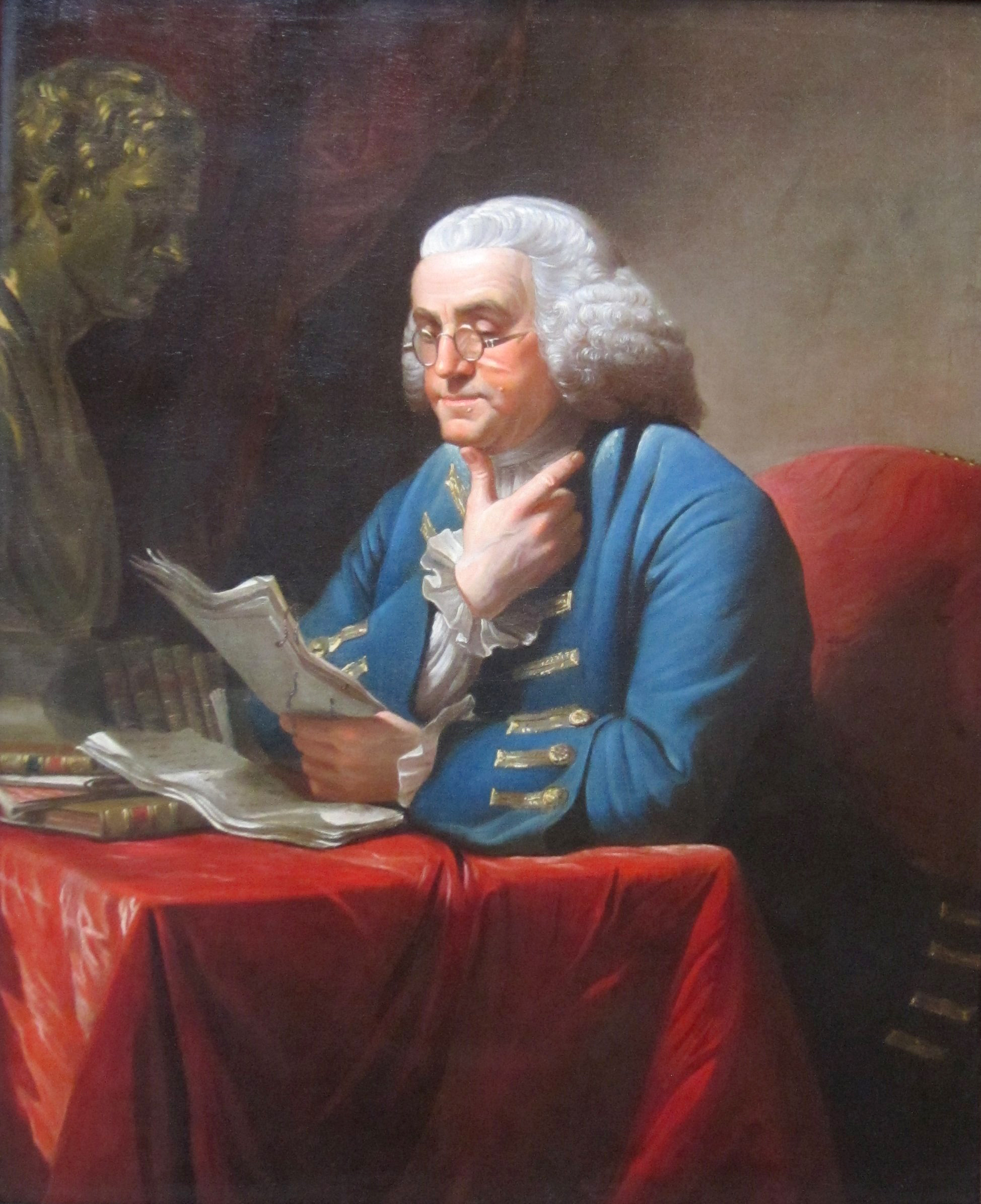
David Martin, Benjamin Franklin with a Bust of Isaac Newton (1767), Pennsylvania Academy of the Fine Arts

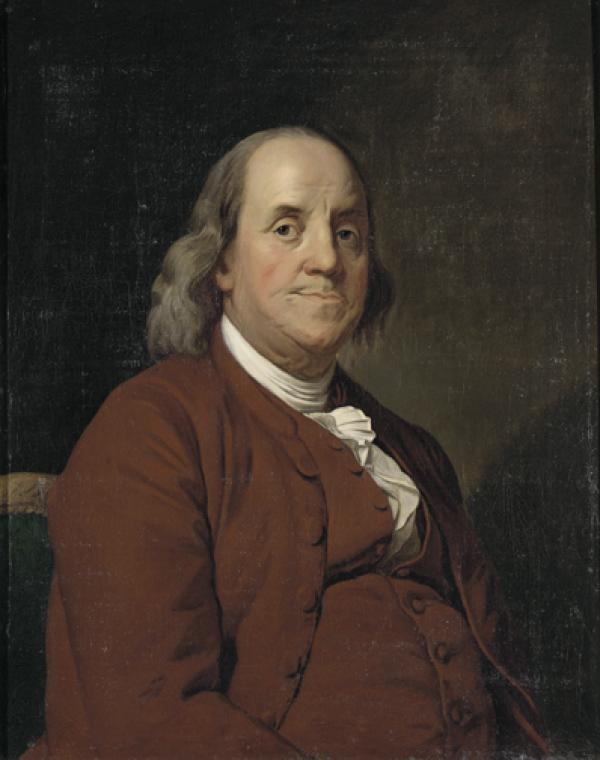
Joseph Wright, Benjamin Franklin (after Joseph Duplessis), (c.1782), Pennsylvania Academy of the Fine Arts

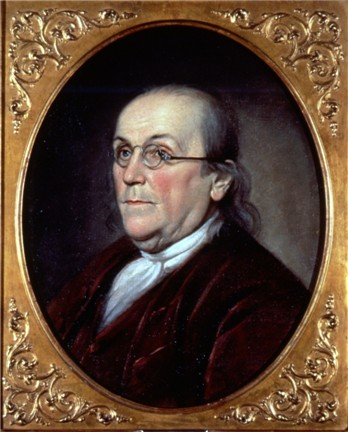
Charles Willson Peale, Benjamin Franklin (1785), Pennsylvania Academy of the Fine Arts

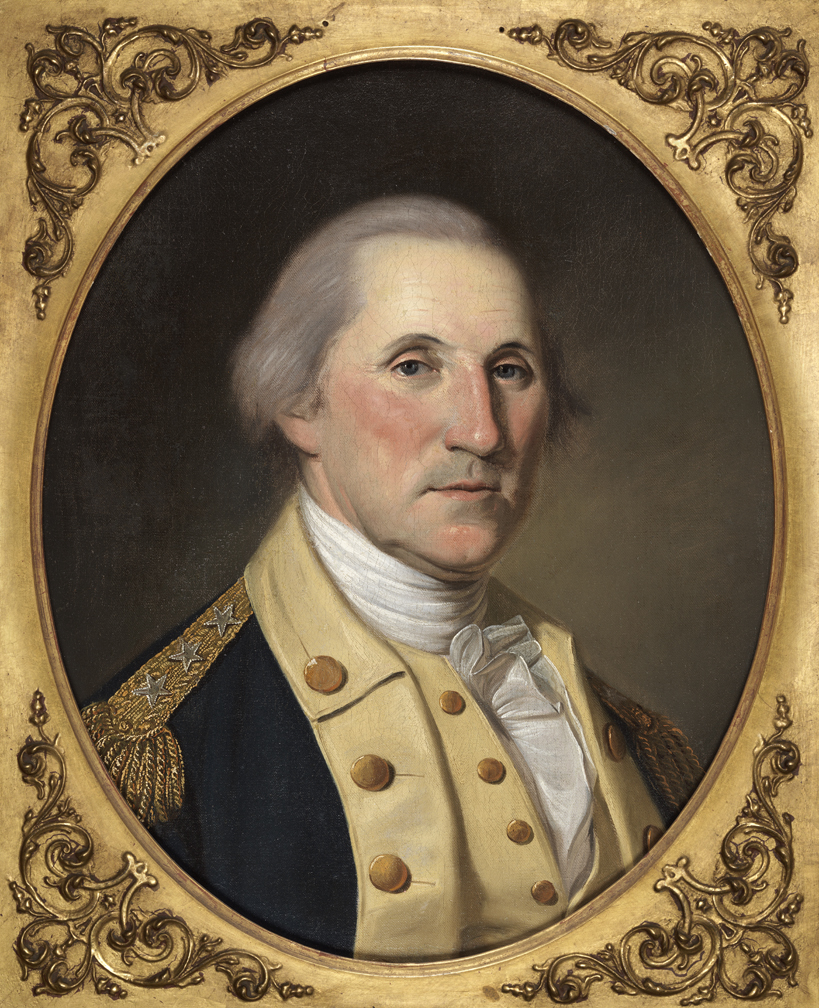
Charles Willson Peale, George Washington (1787), Pennsylvania Academy of the Fine Arts

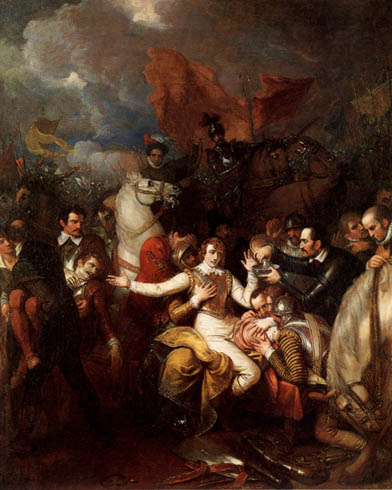
Benjamin West, The Fatal Wounding of Sir Philip Sidney (1806), Woodmere Art Museum

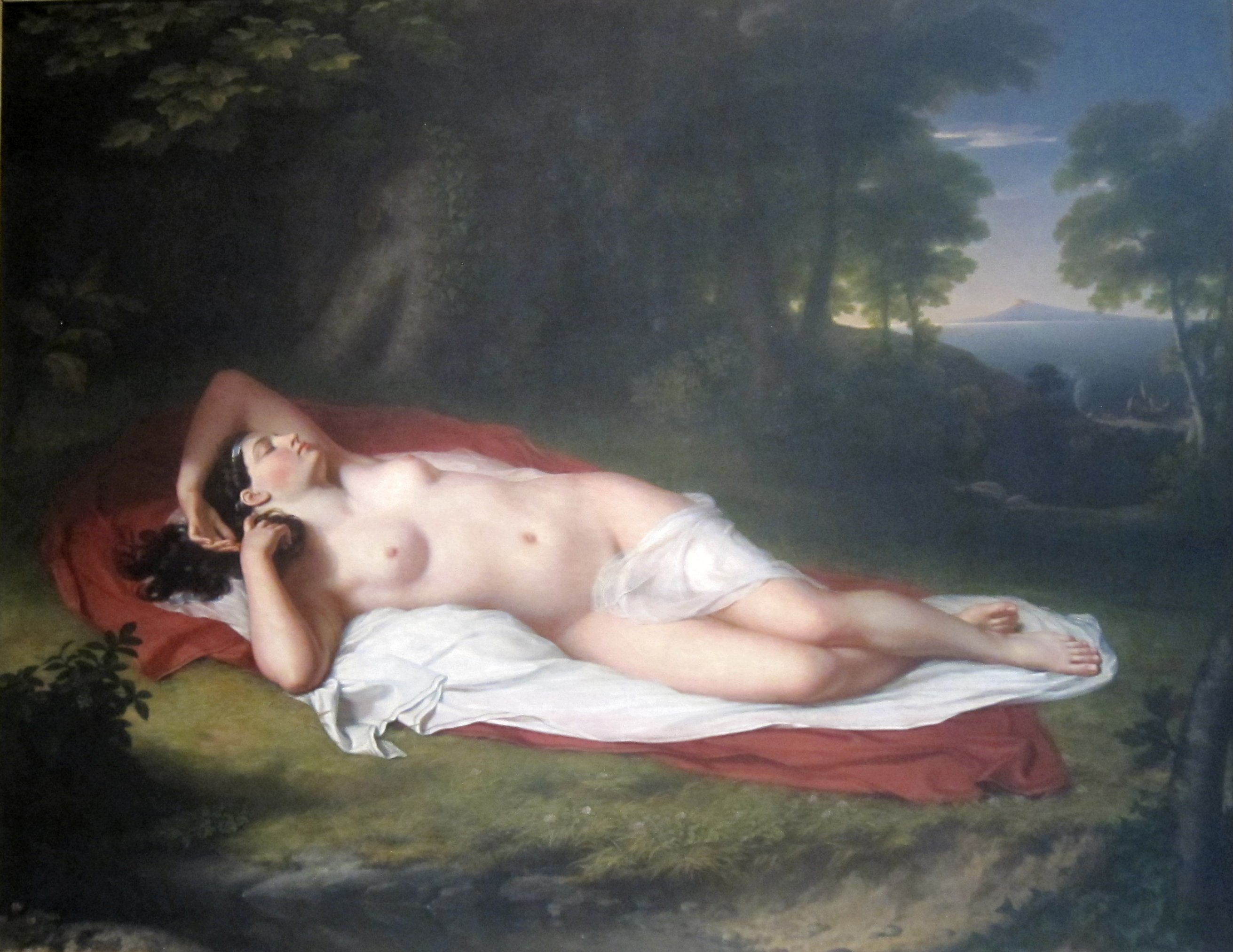
John Vanderlyn, Ariadne Asleep on the Island of Naxos (c.1812), Pennsylvania Academy of the Fine Arts

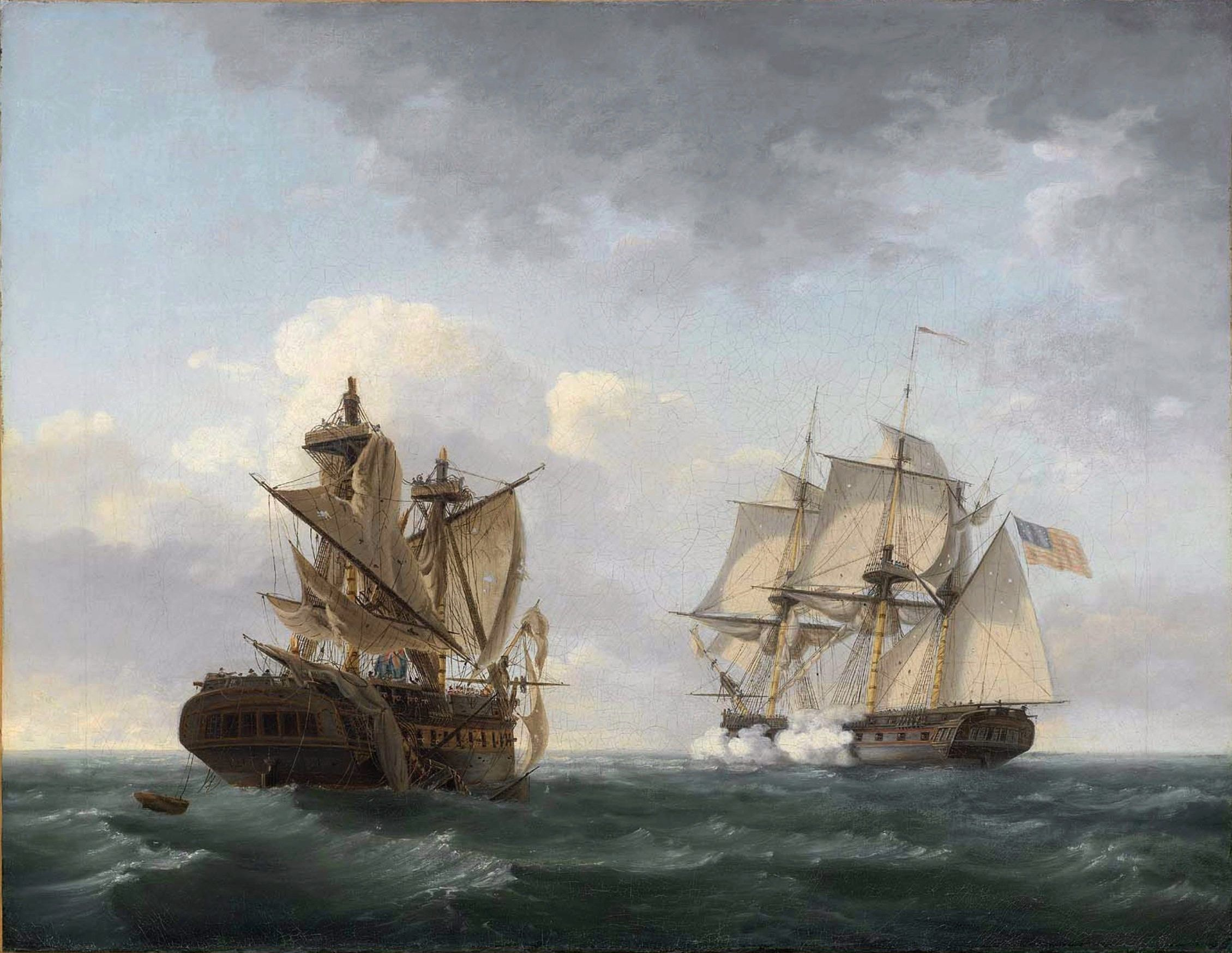
Thomas Birch, Engagement between The United States and The Macedonian (1813), Philadelphia History Museum

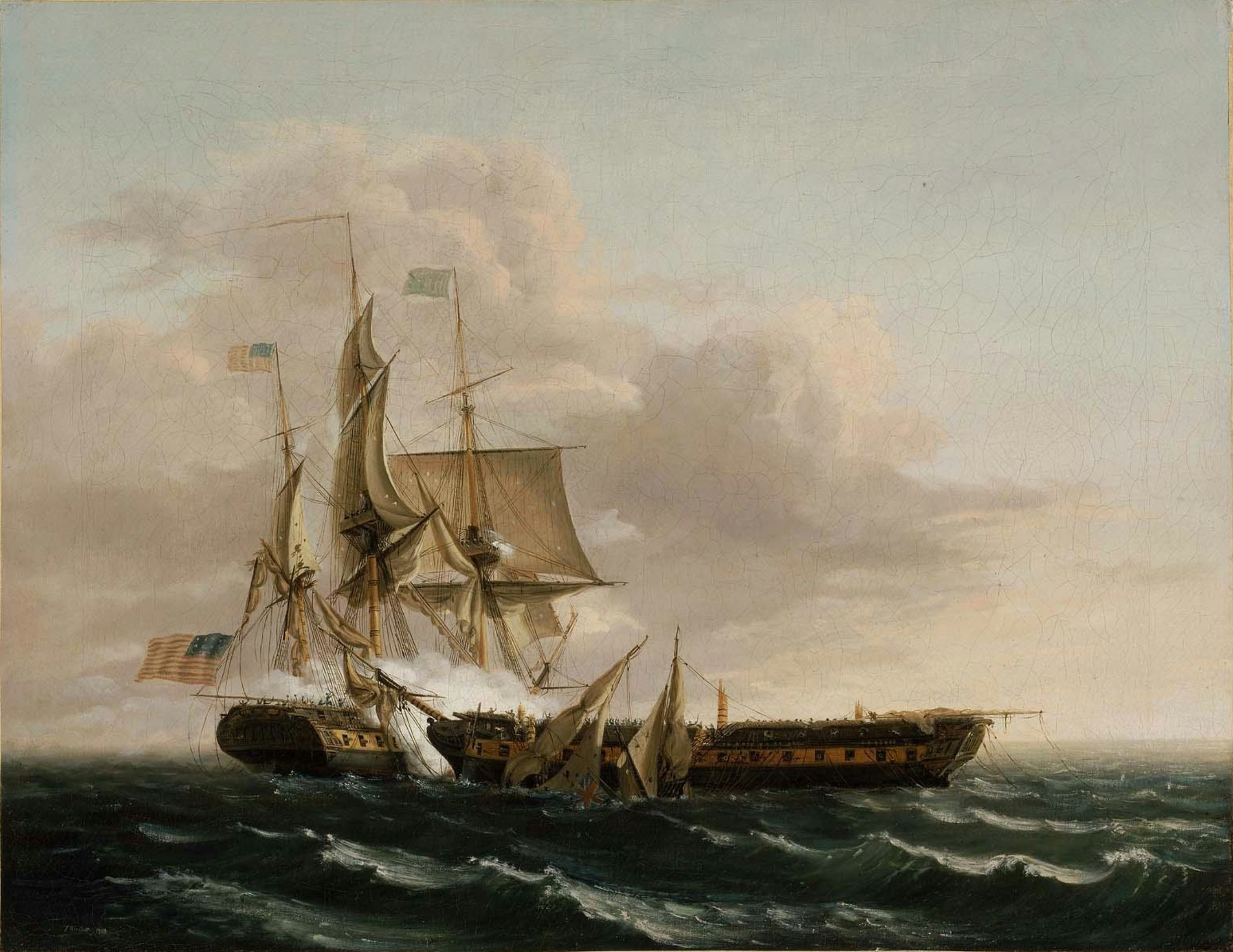
Thomas Birch, Engagement between The Constitution and The Guerrière (1813), Museum of Fine Arts, Boston

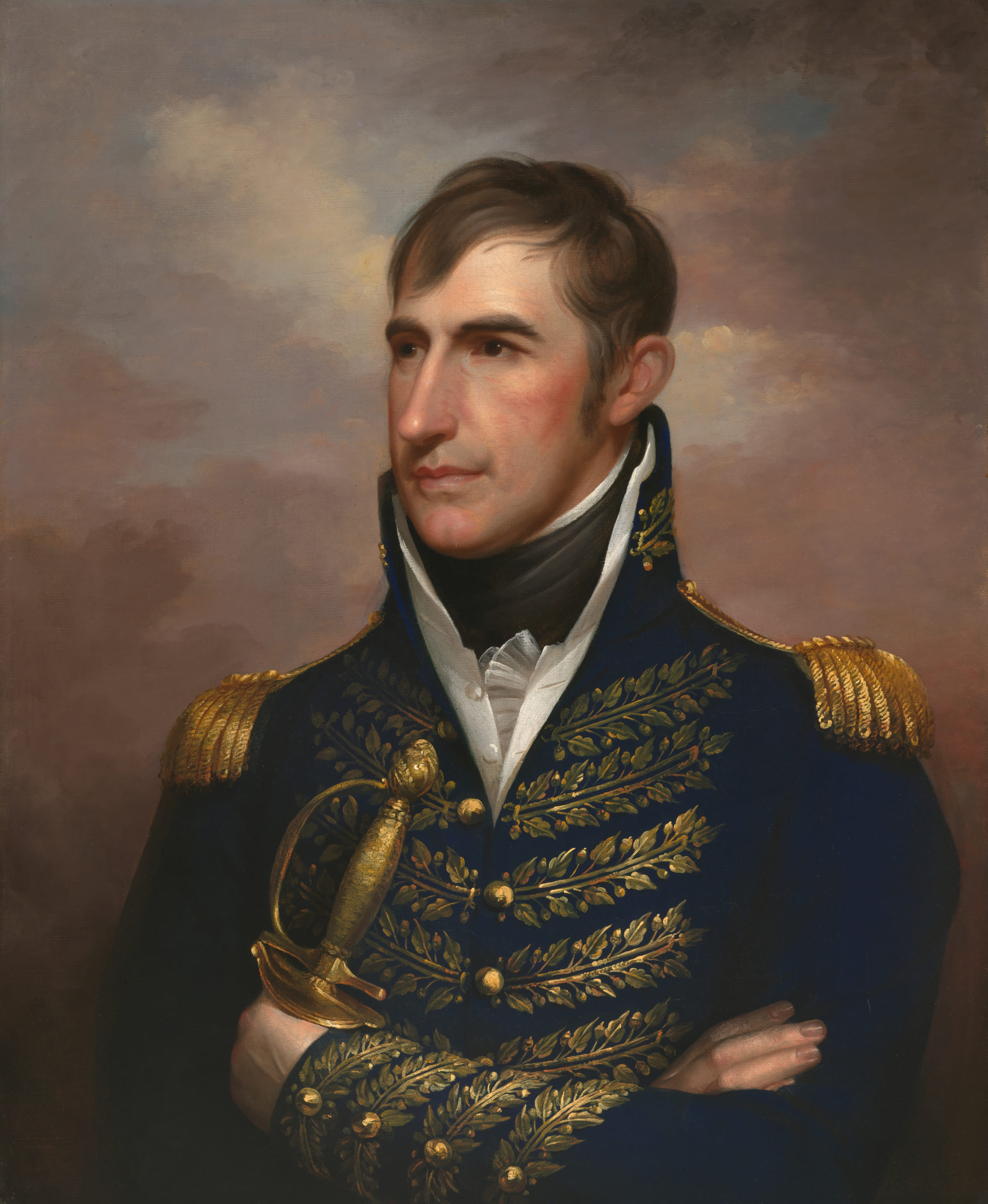
Rembrandt Peale, William Henry Harrison (c.1813), National Portrait Gallery

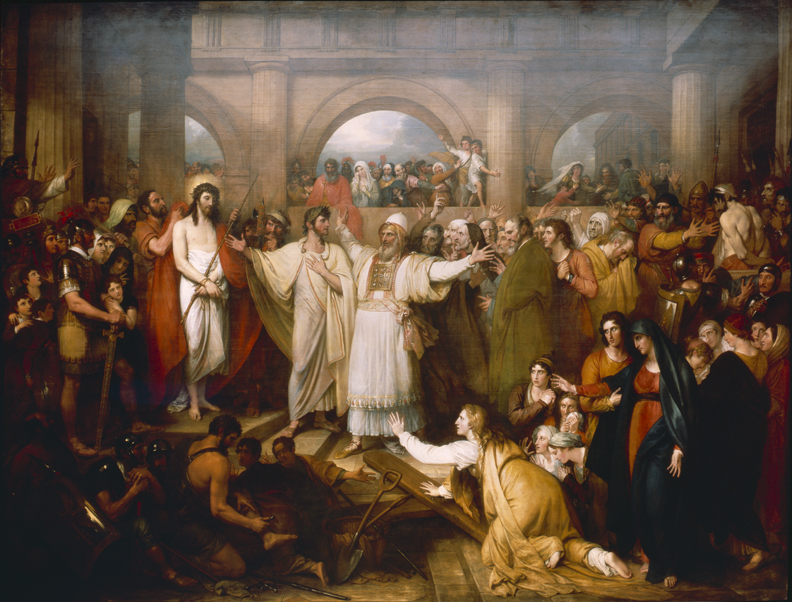
Benjamin West, Christ Rejected (1814), Pennsylvania Academy of the Fine Arts

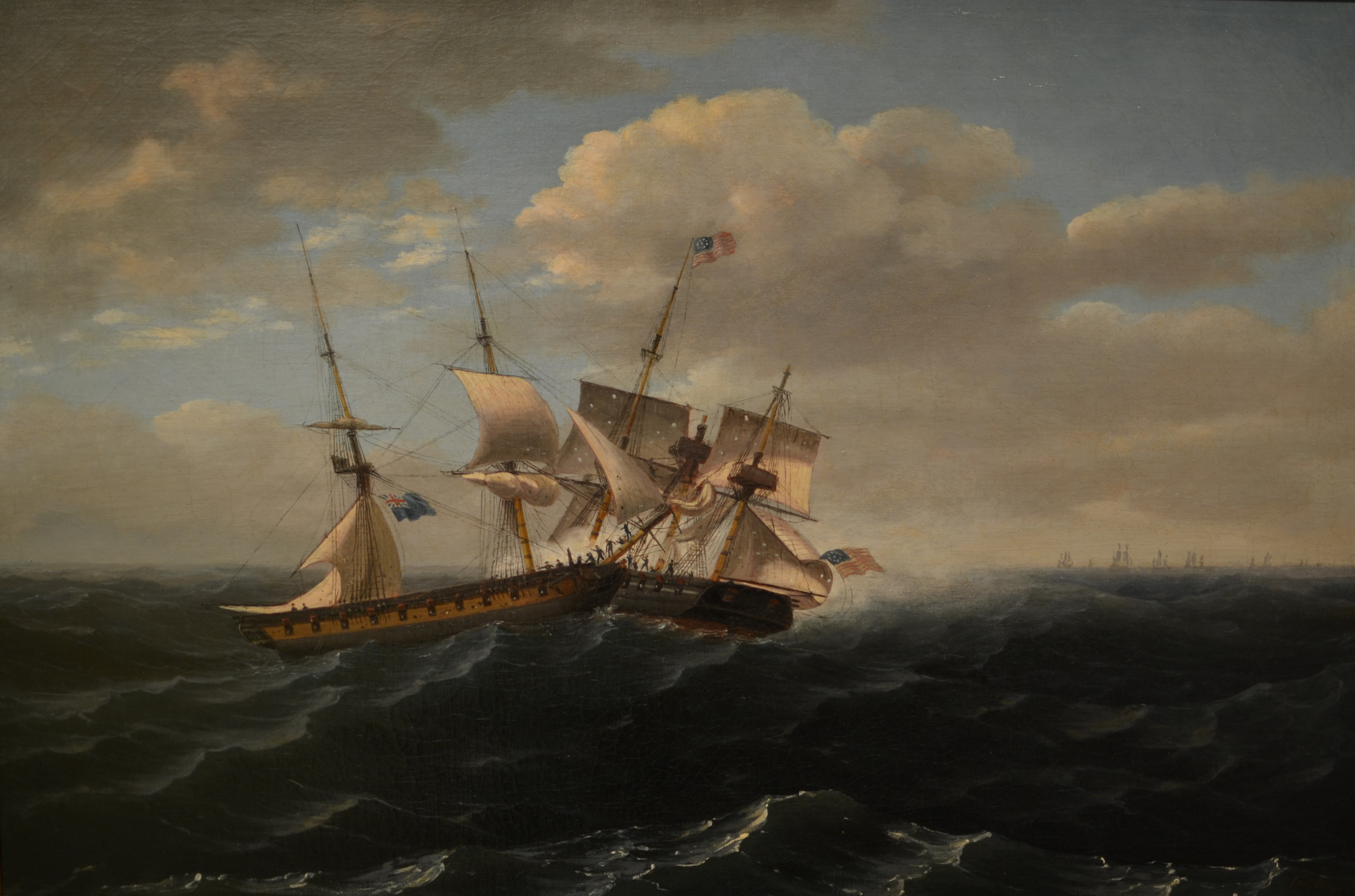
Thomas Birch, Engagement between The Wasp and The Frolic (1820), Philadelphia Museum of Art

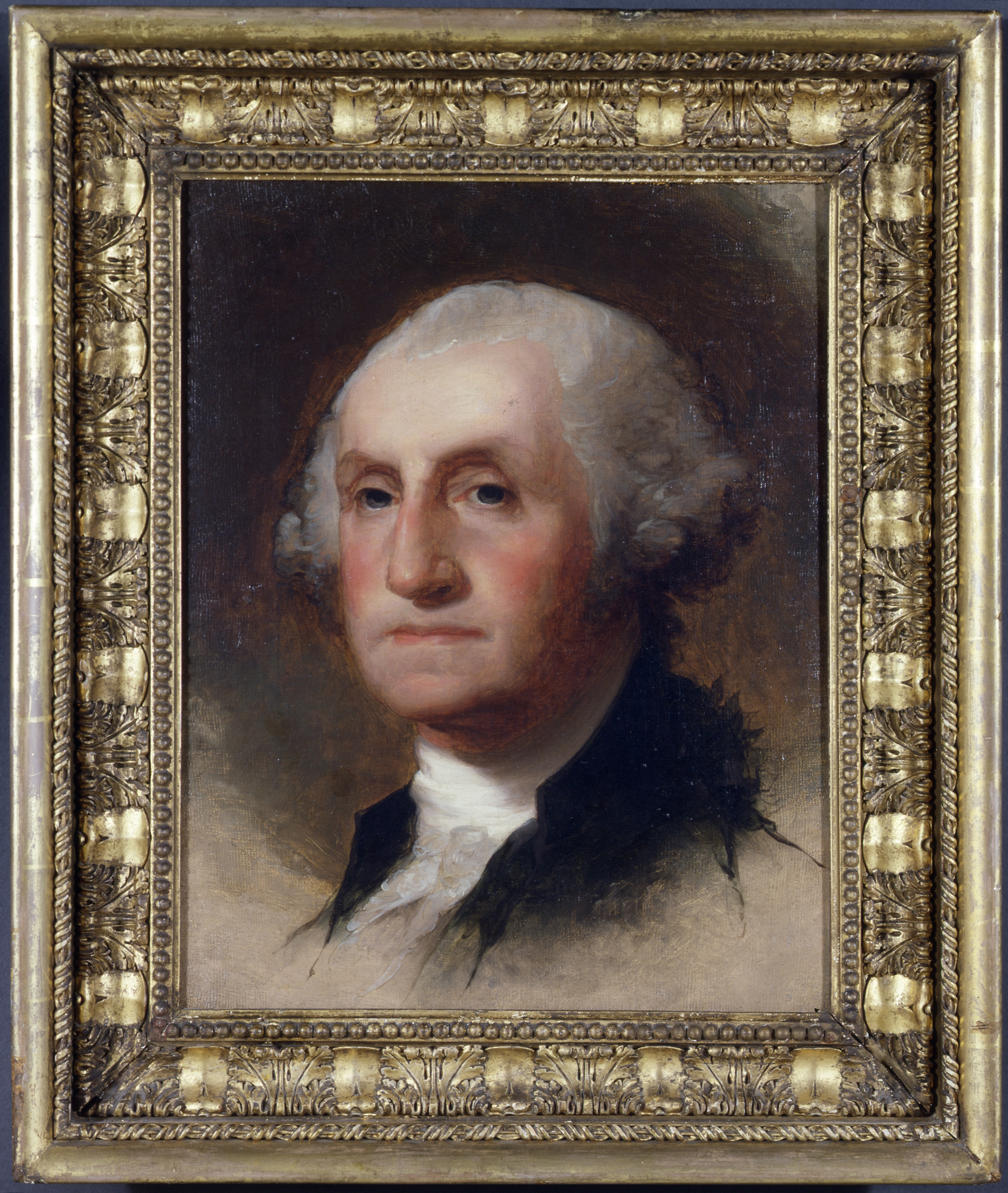
Thomas Sully (after Gilbert Stuart), George Washington (1820), Lyndon Baines Johnson Library and Museum

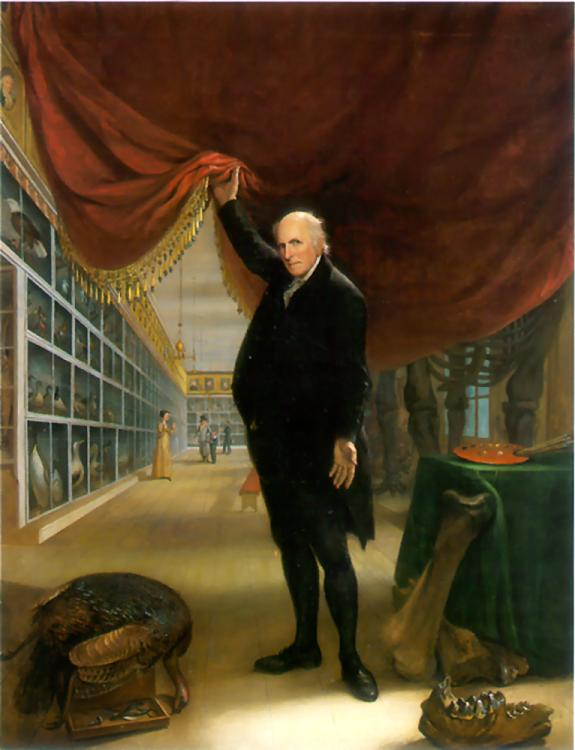
Charles Willson Peale, The Artist in His Museum (1822), Pennsylvania Academy of the Fine Arts

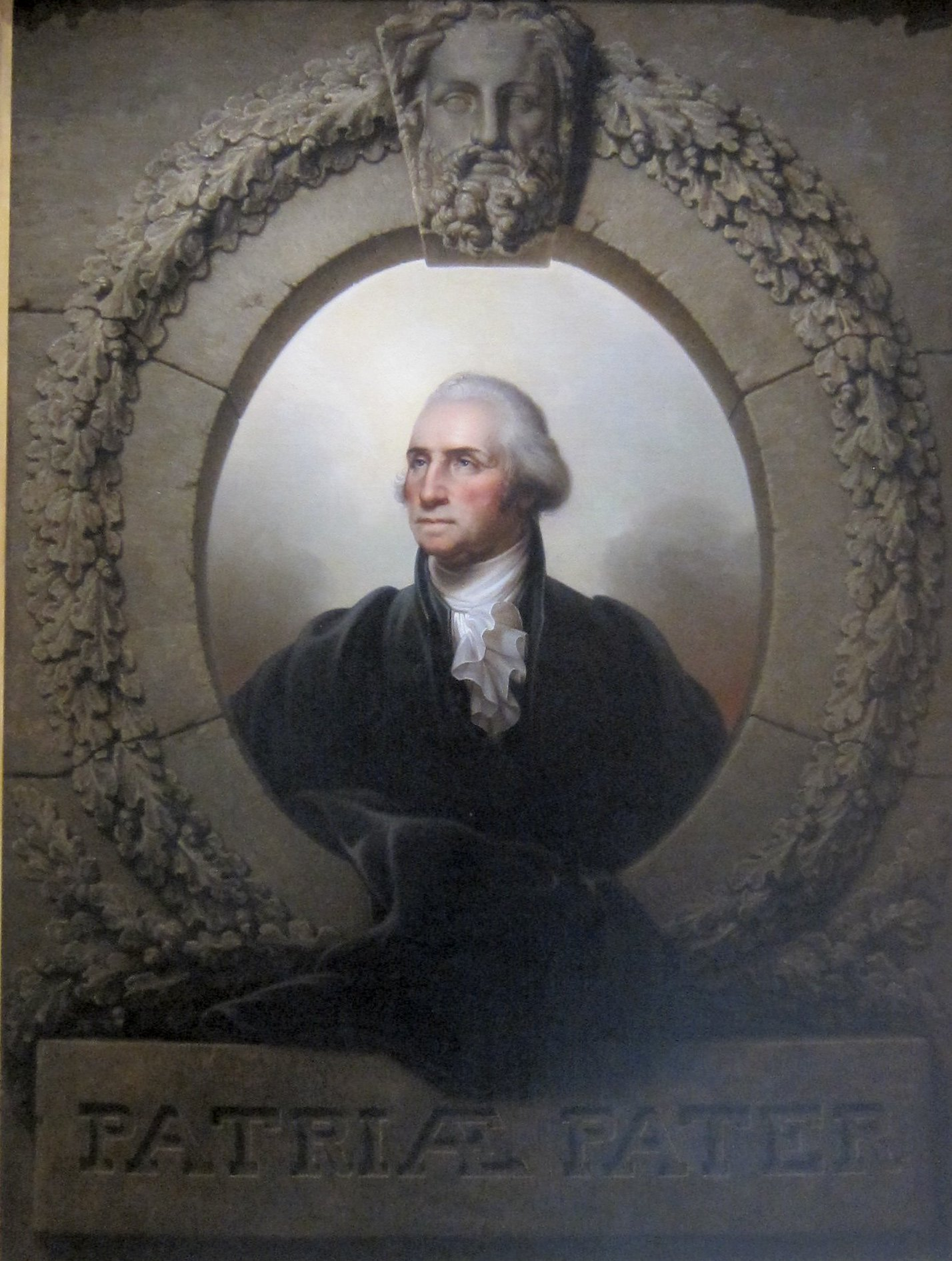
Rembrandt Peale, George Washington, Patriae Pater (c.1824), Pennsylvania Academy of the Fine Arts

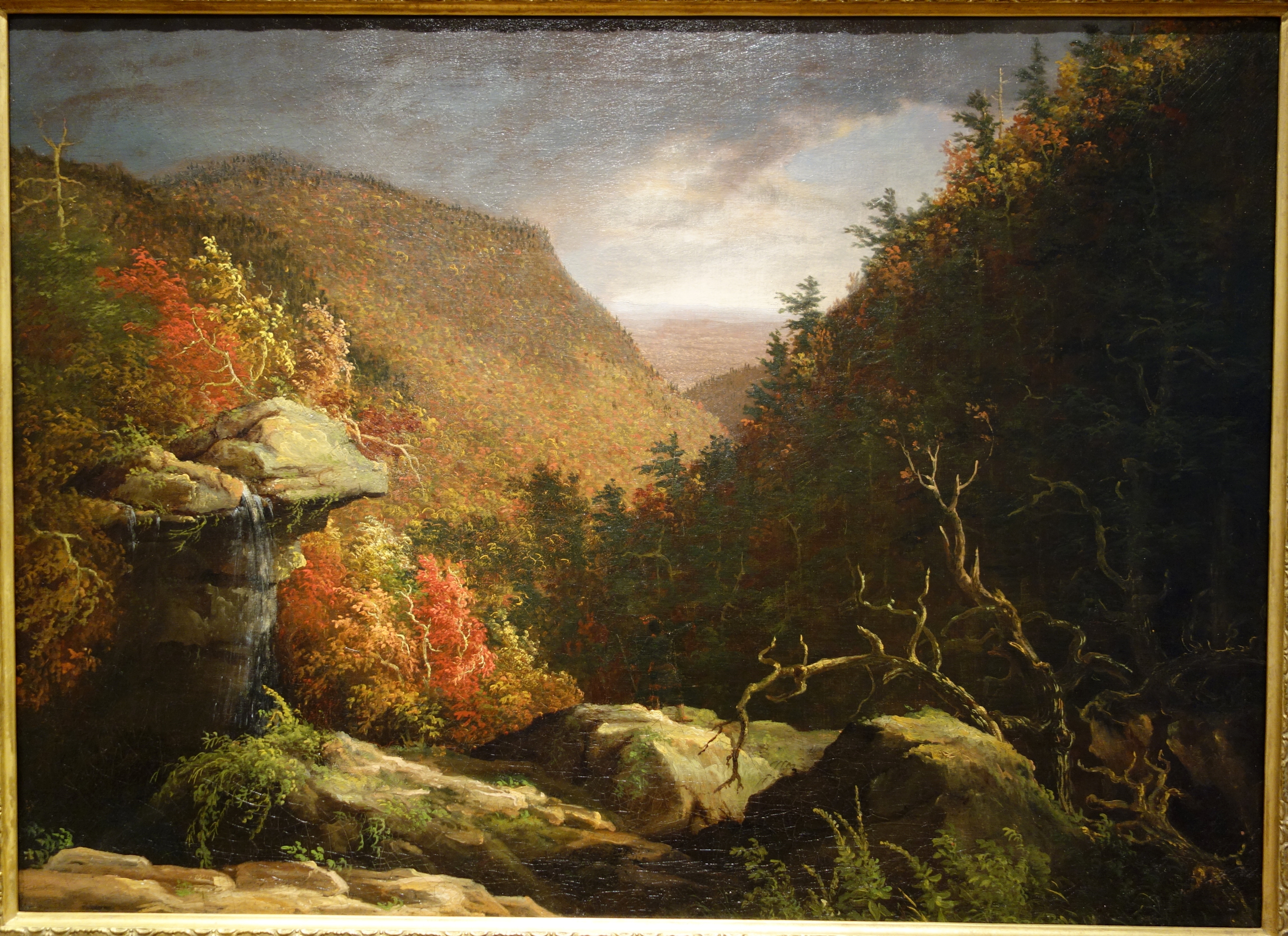
Thomas Cole, The Clove, Catskill Mountains (1827), New Britain Museum of American Art

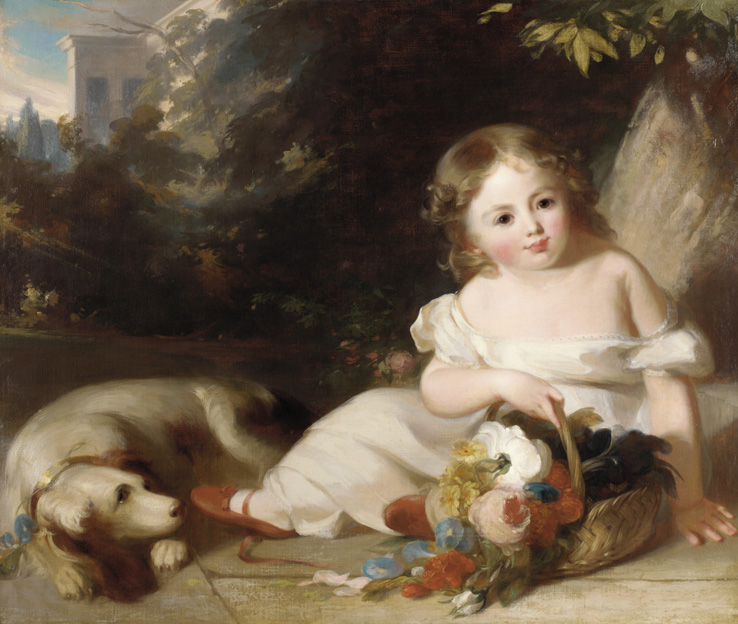
Thomas Sully, Child and Dog (1828), Pennsylvania Academy of the Fine Arts

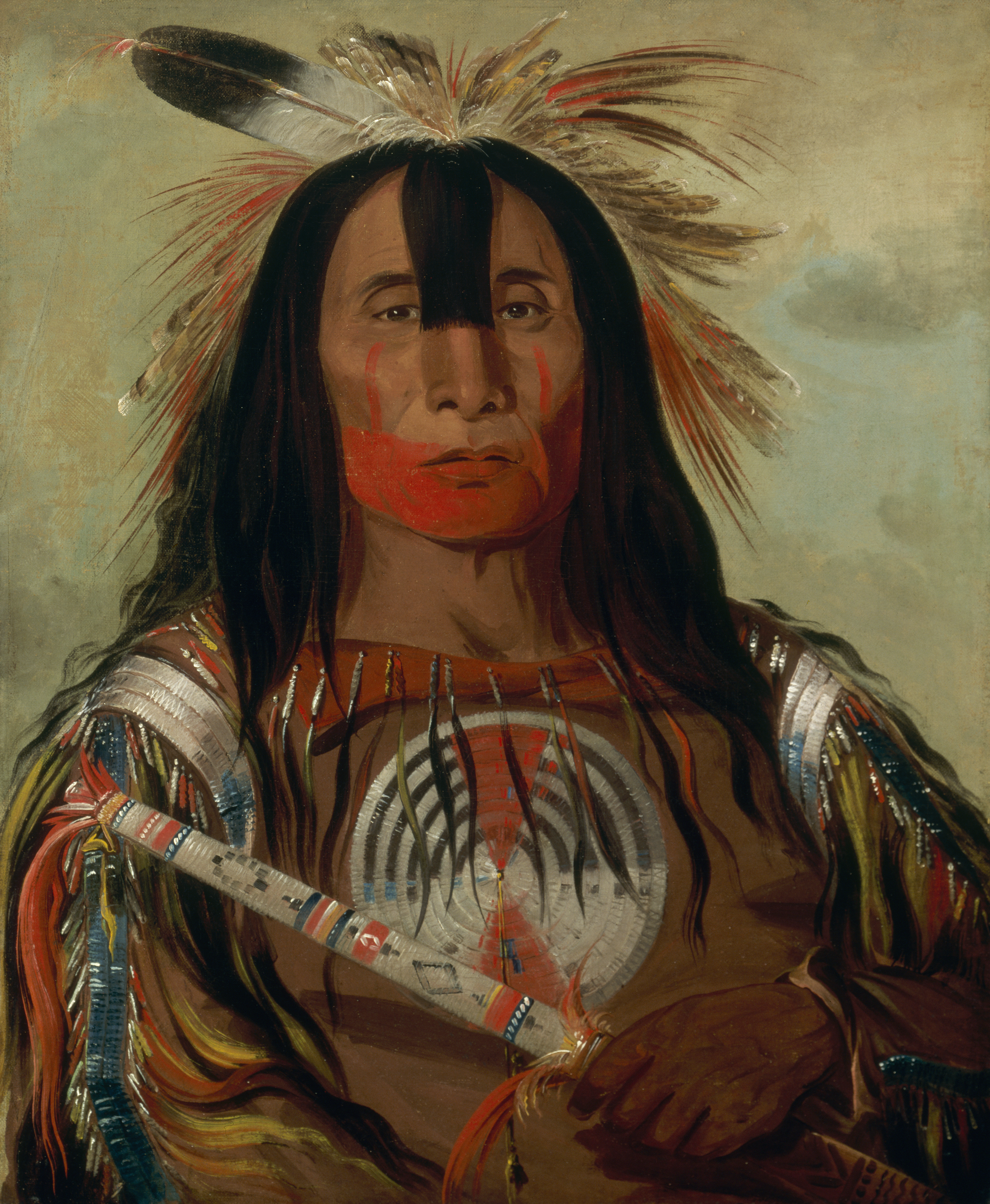
George Catlin, Buffalo Bulls Back Fat (1832), Smithsonian American Art Museum

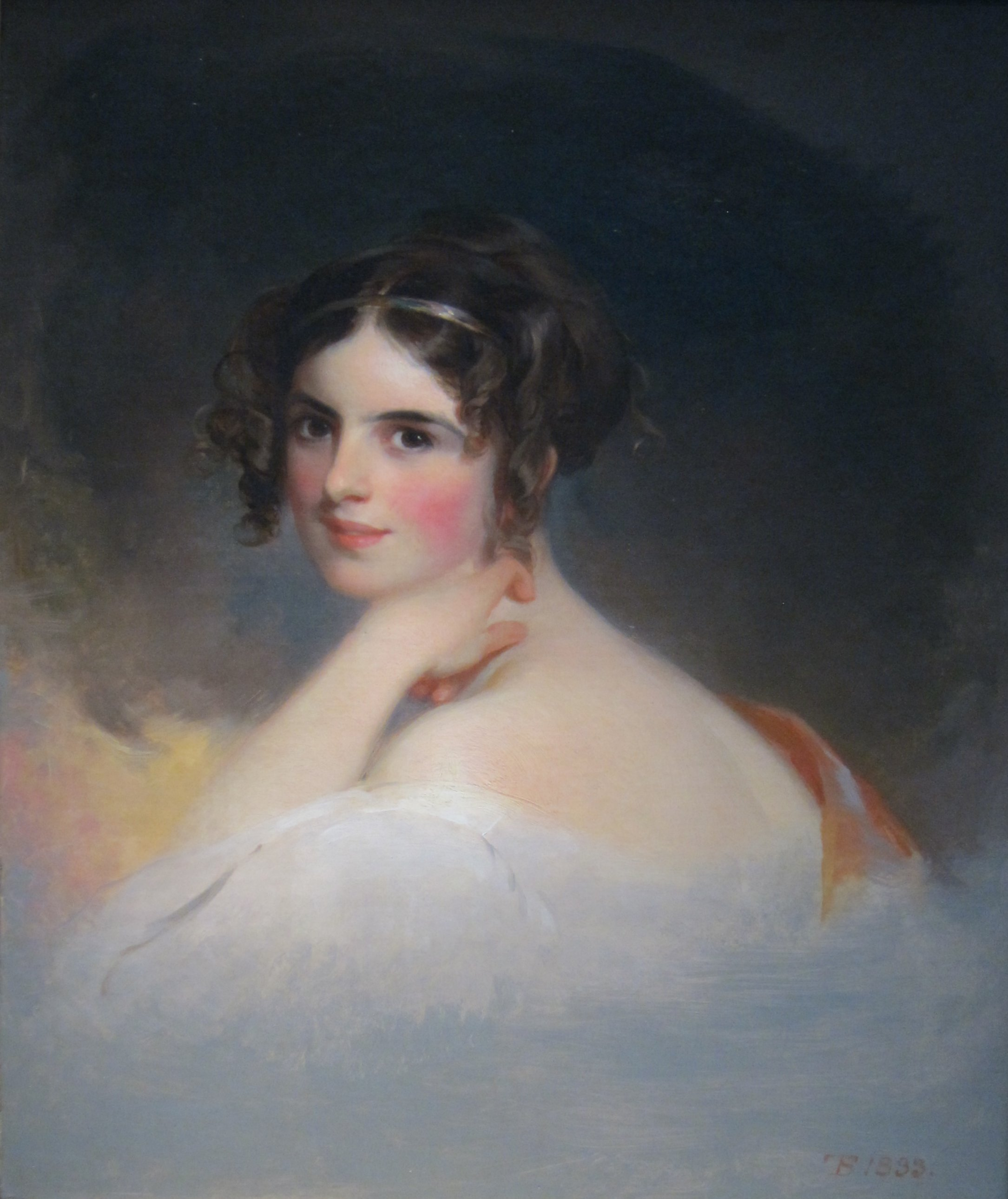
Thomas Sully, Frances Anne Kemble as Beatrice (1833), Pennsylvania Academy of the Fine Arts

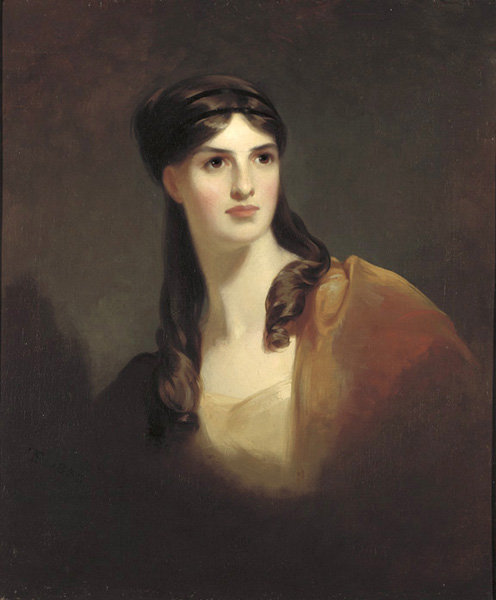
Thomas Sully, Frances Anne Kemble as Bianca (replica by Sully after his 1833 original), The White House

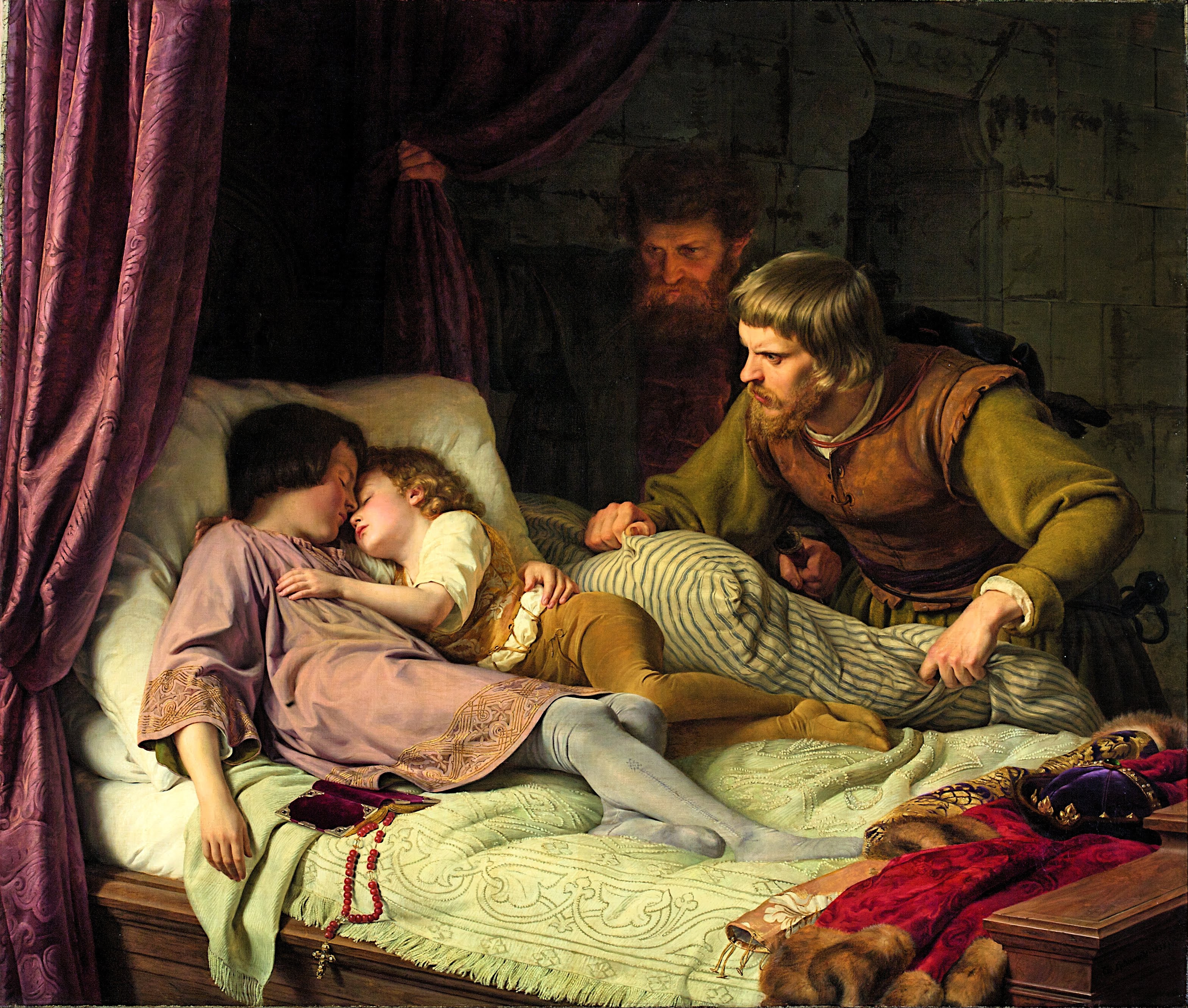
Theodor Hildebrandt, Murder of the Sons of Edward IV (1835), Museum Kunstpalast, Germany

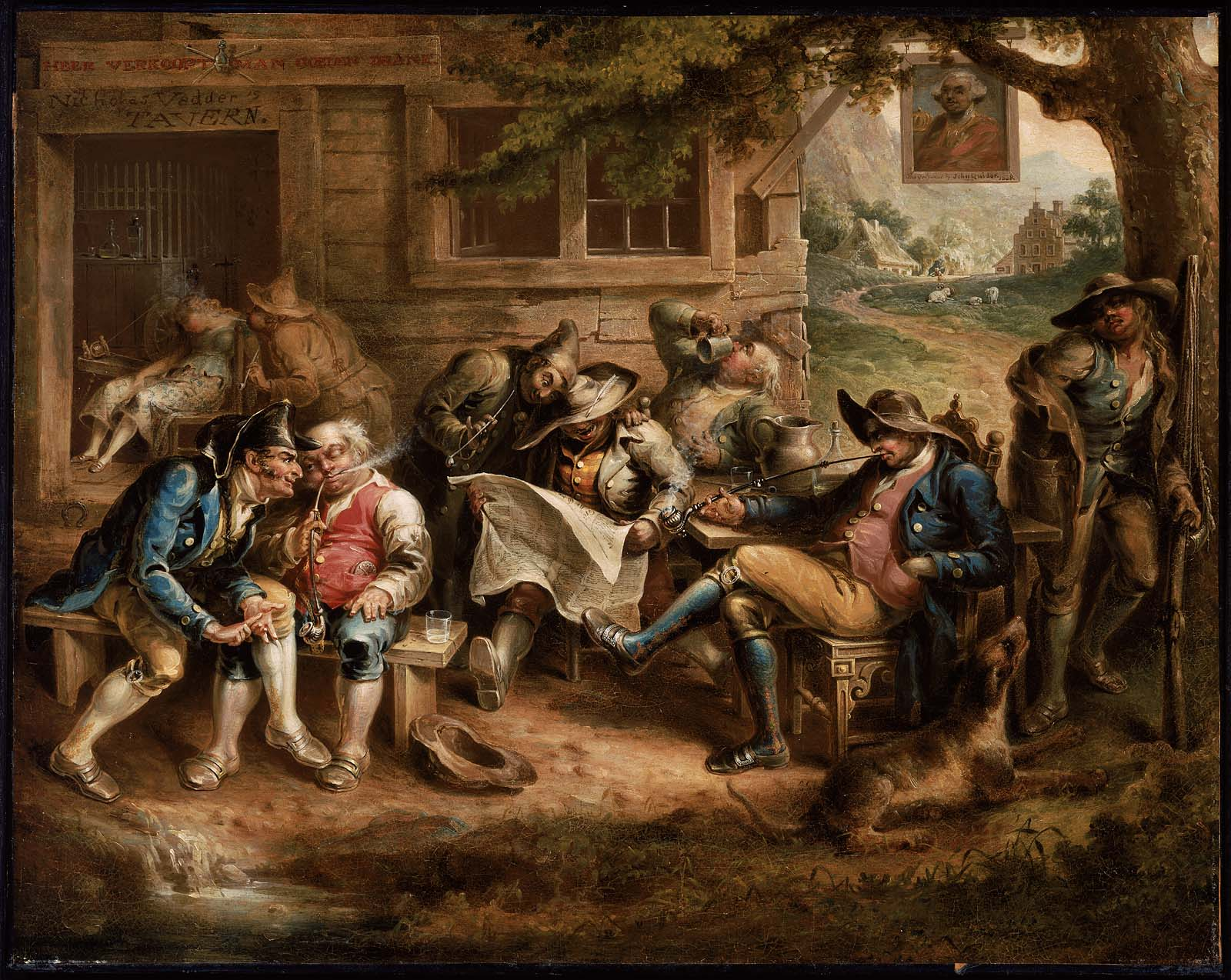
John Quidor, Rip Van Winkle at the Village Tavern (1839), Museum of Fine Arts, Boston

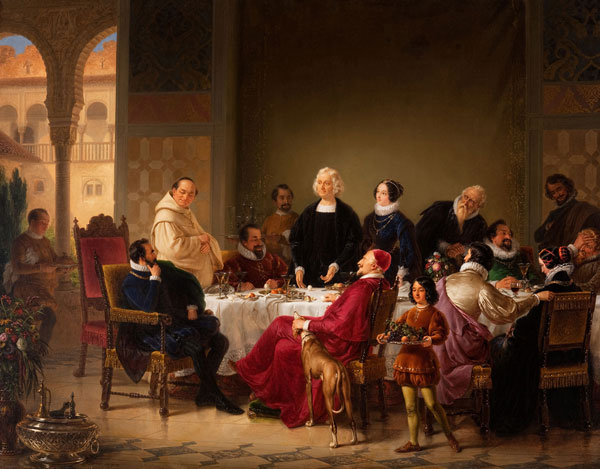
Johann Geyer, Columbus and the Egg (1847), Woodmere Art Museum

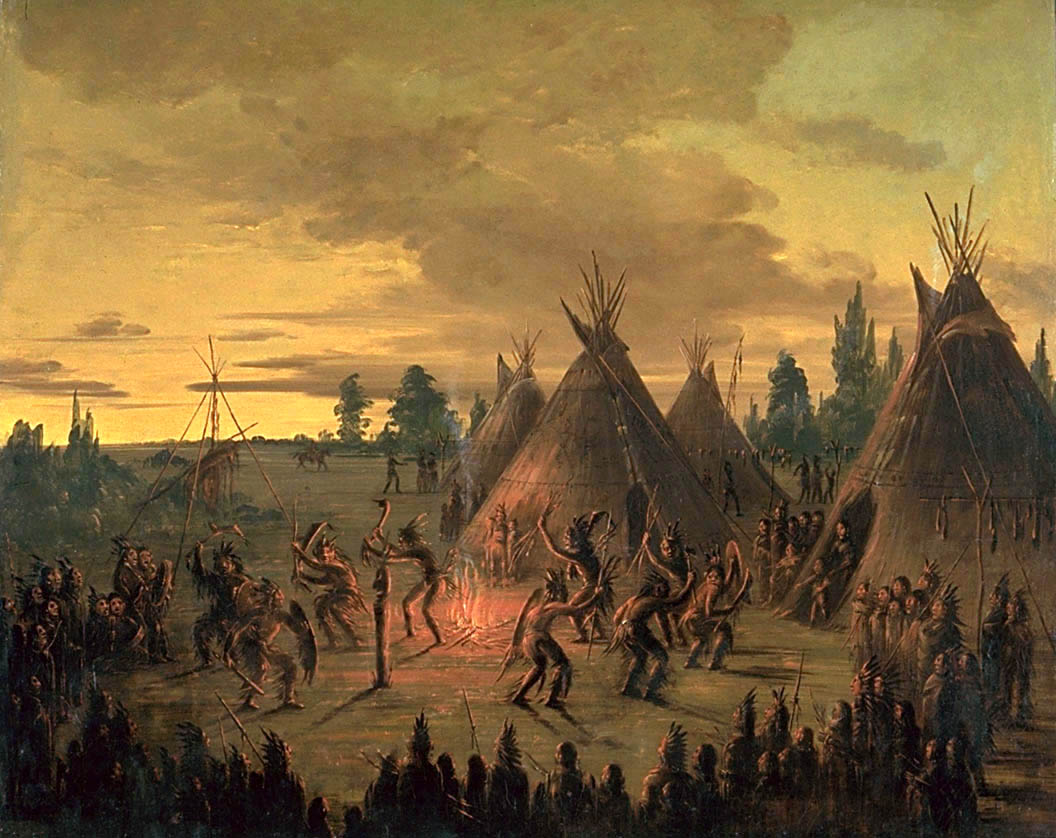
George Catlin, War Dance, Sioux (c.1848) Smithsonian American Art Museum

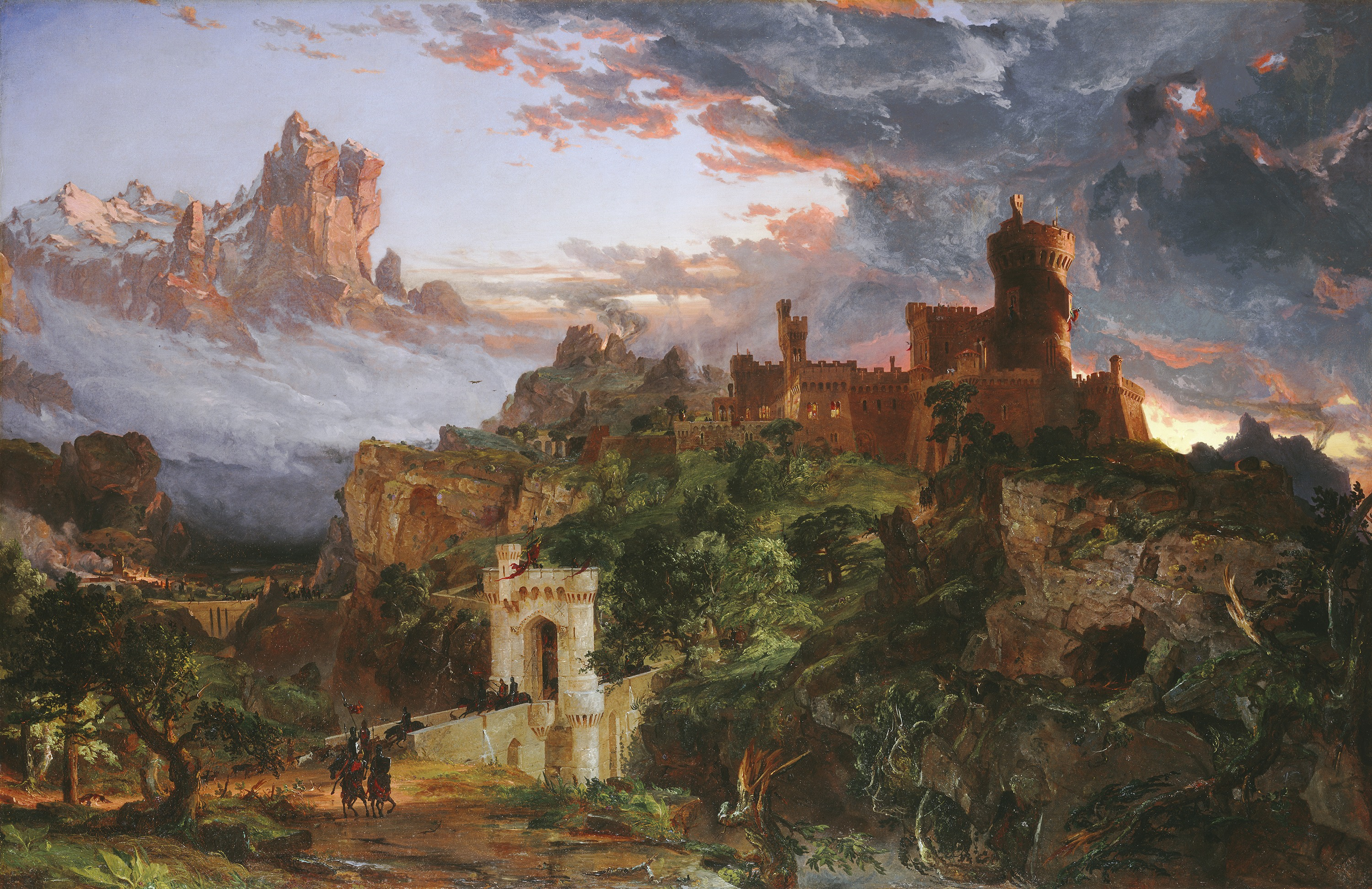
Jasper Francis Cropsey, The Spirit of War (1851), National Gallery of Art

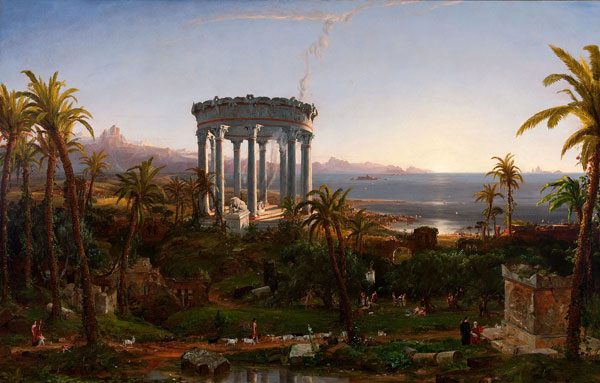
Jasper Francis Cropsey, The Spirit of Peace (1851), Woodmere Art Museum

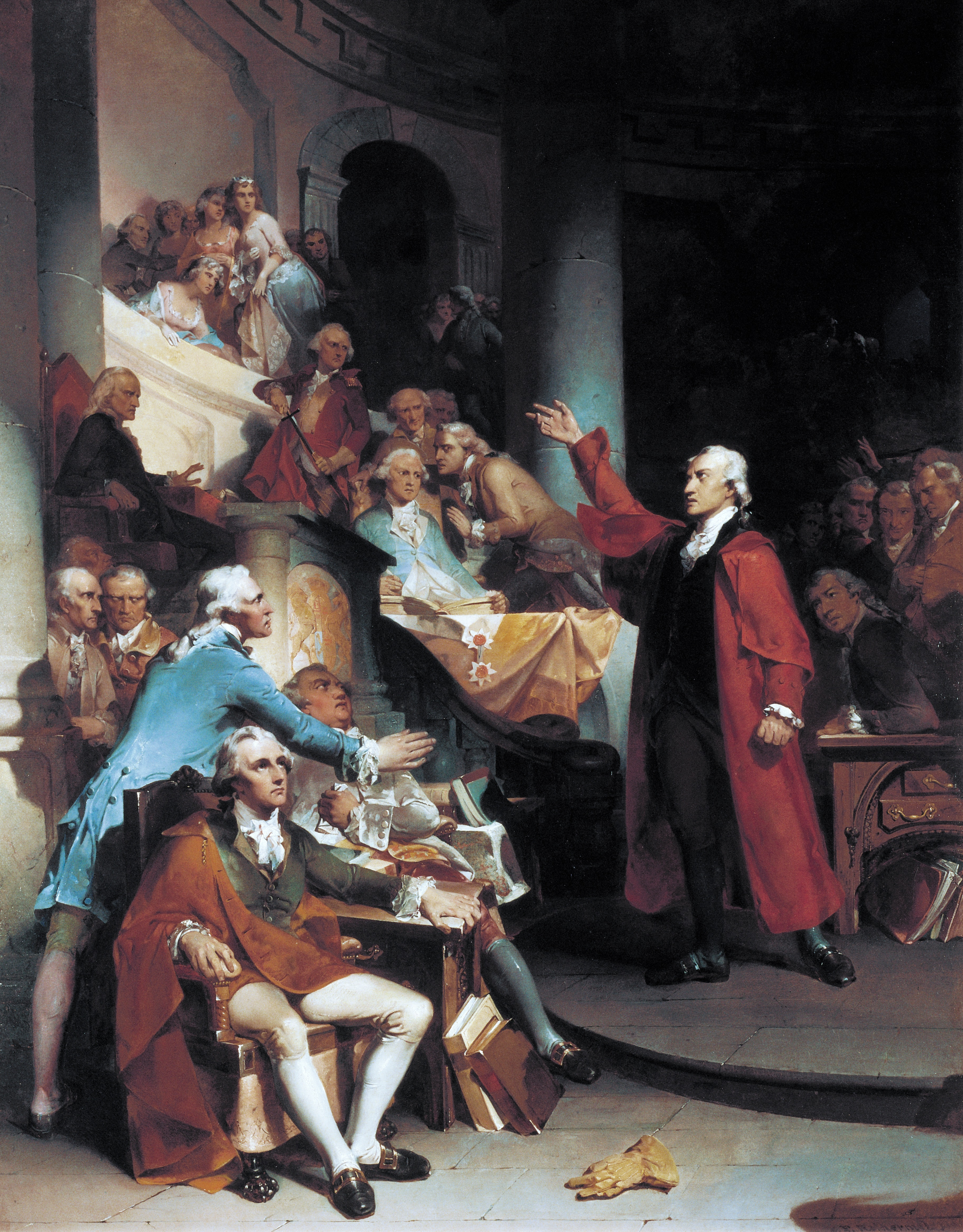
Peter F. Rothermel, Patrick Henry before the Virginia House of Burgesses (1851), Patrick Henry Memorial Foundation

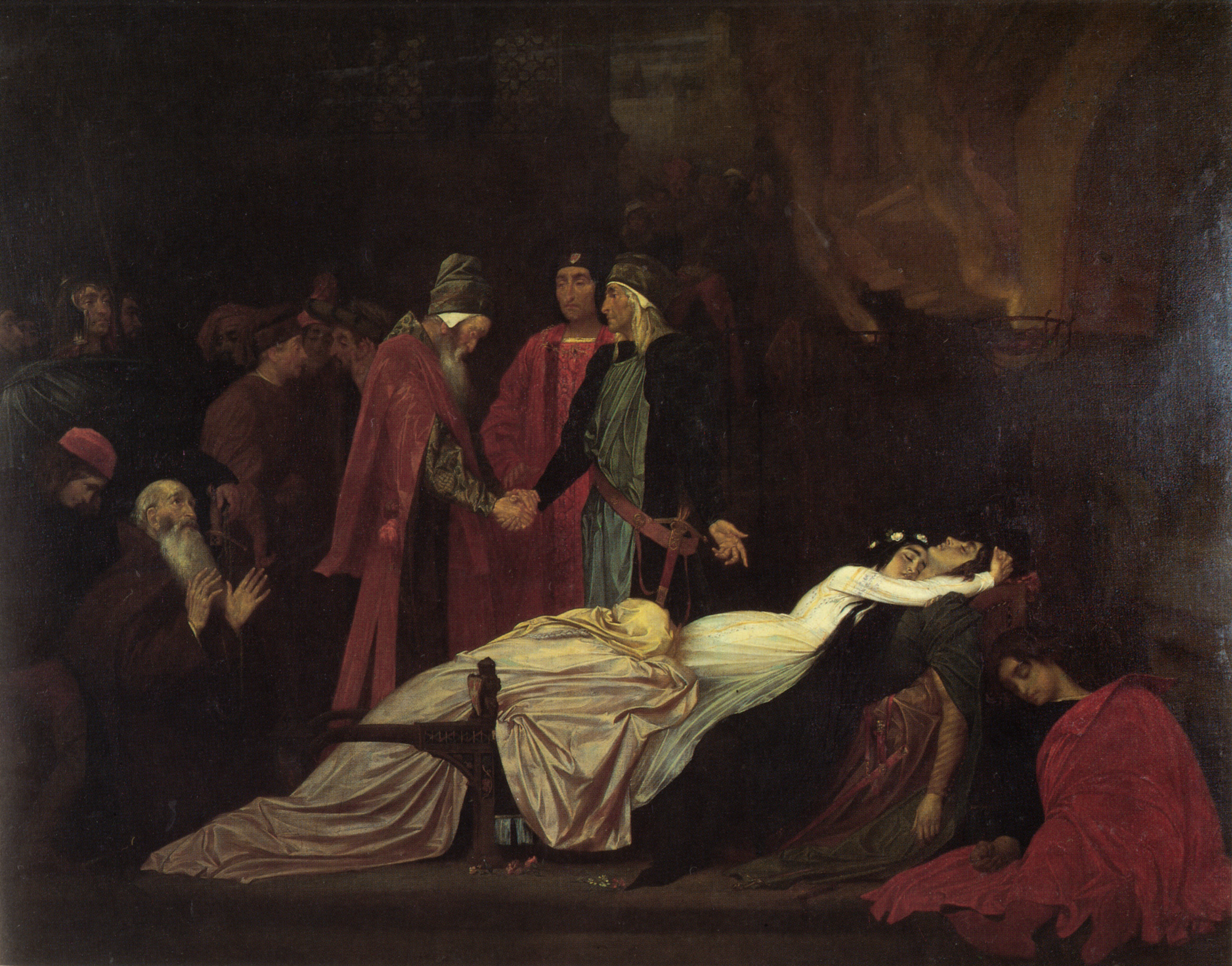
Frederick Leighton, Reconciliation of the Montagues and Capulets (1855), private collection

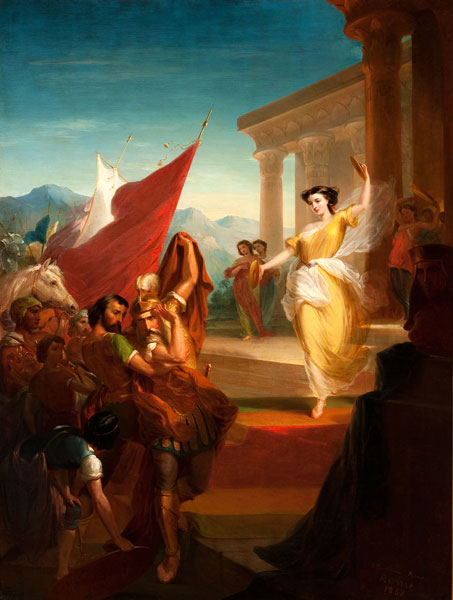
Thomas Buchanan Read, Jephthah’s Daughter (1858), Woodmere Art Museum

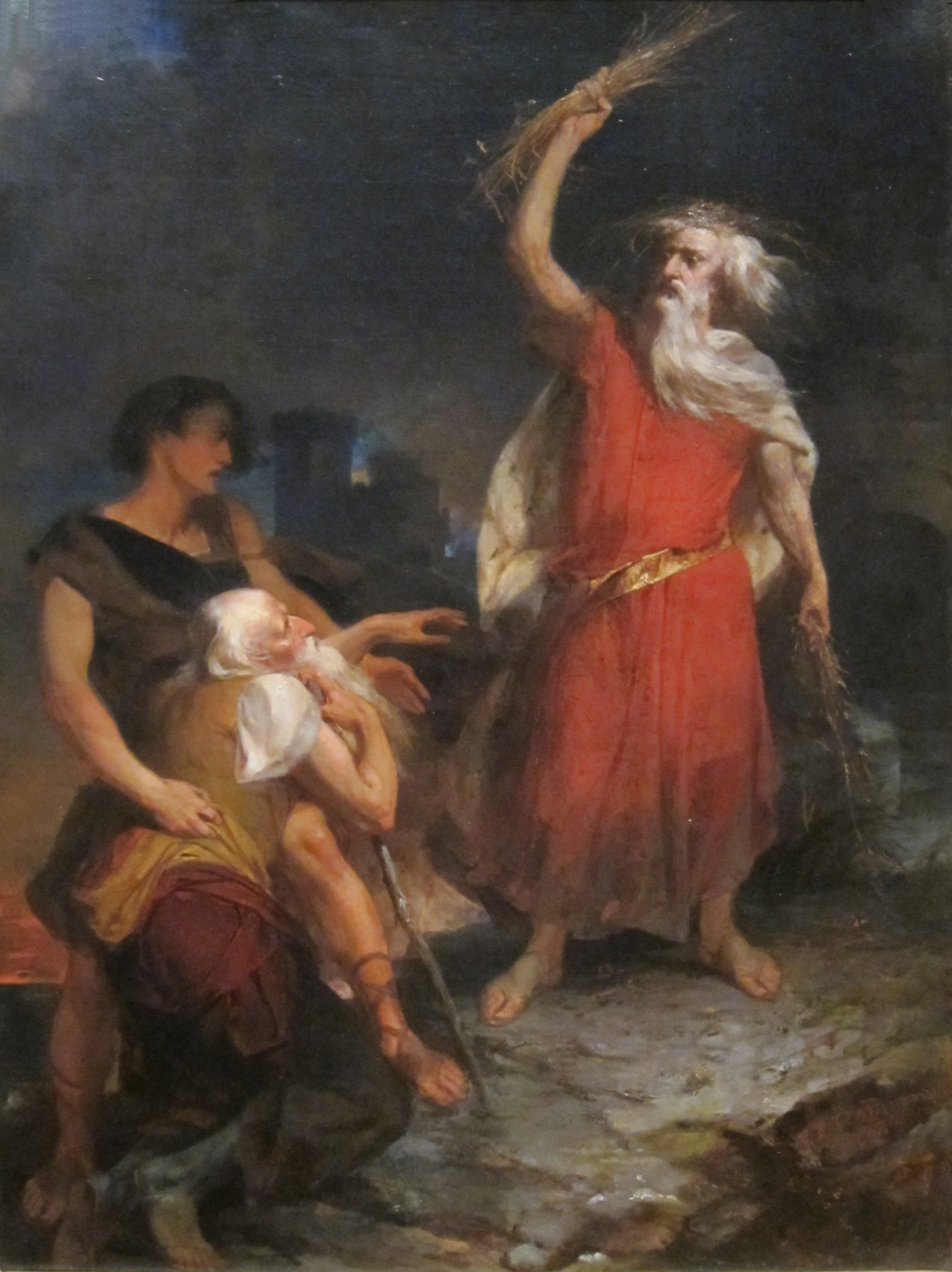
Peter F. Rothermel, King Lear, Gloster and Edgar (1858), Dayton Art Institute

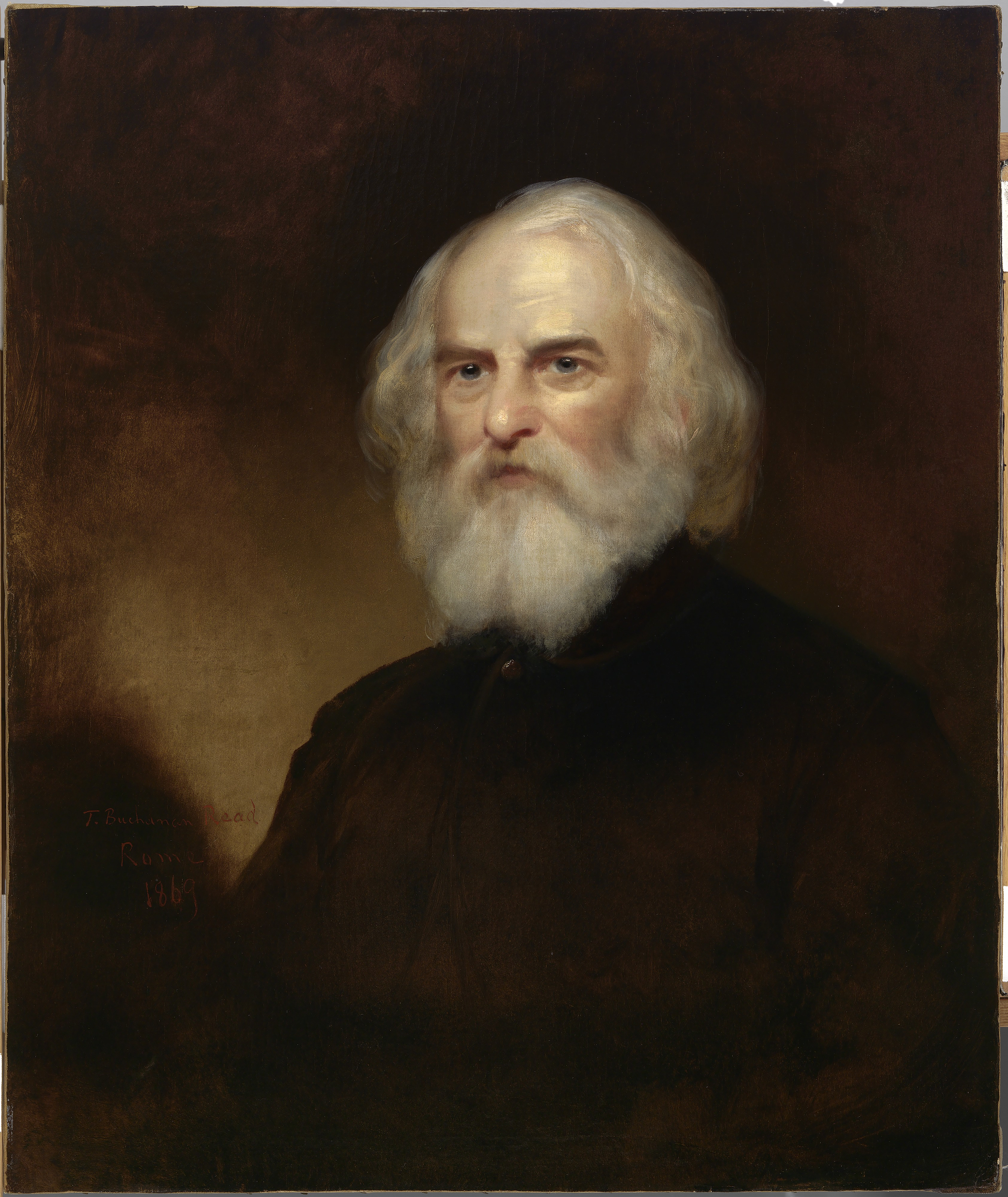
Thomas Buchanan Read, Henry Wadsworth Longfellow (1858), National Portrait Gallery

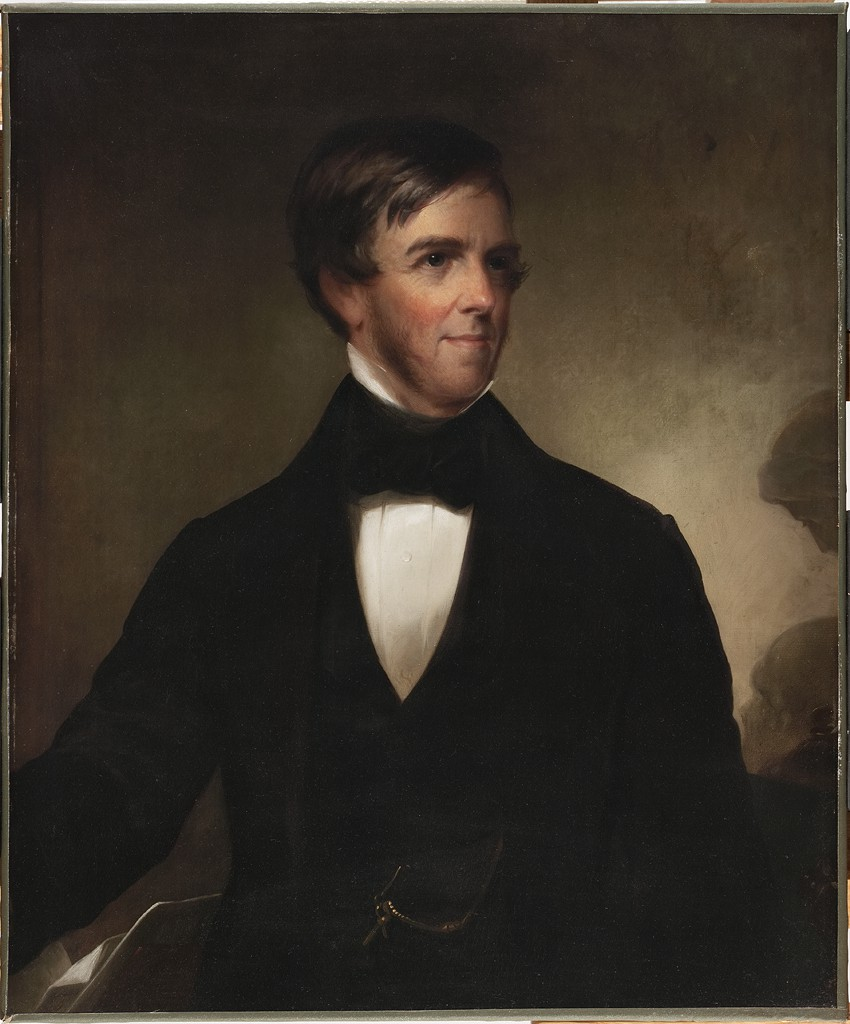
Thomas Buchanan Read, Oliver Wendell Holmes (1859), Harvard Art Museums

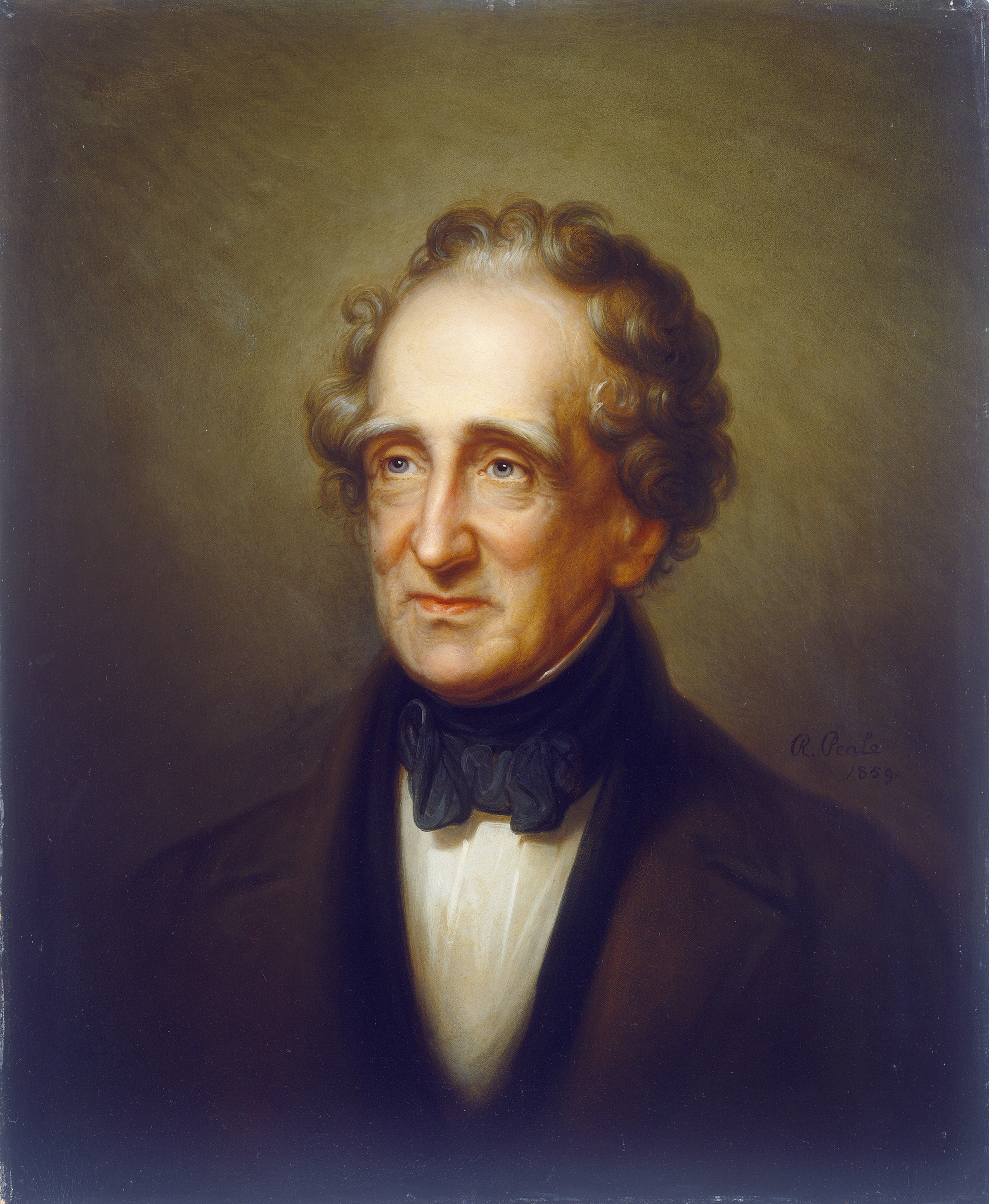
Rembrandt Peale, Thomas Sully (1859), National Gallery of Art

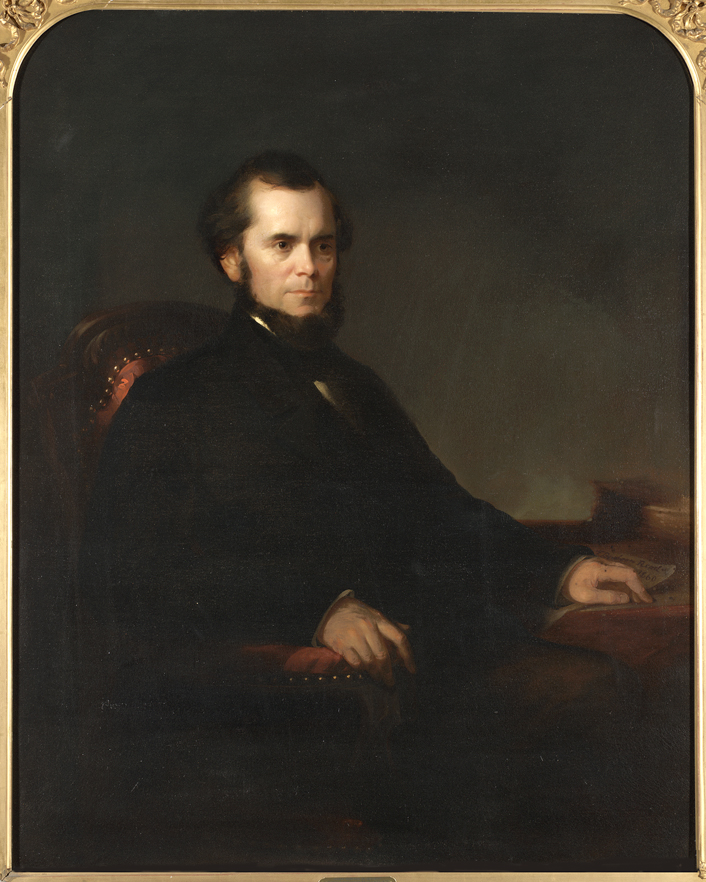
Thomas Buchanan Read, Joseph Harrison, Jr. (1860), Pennsylvania Academy of the Fine Arts

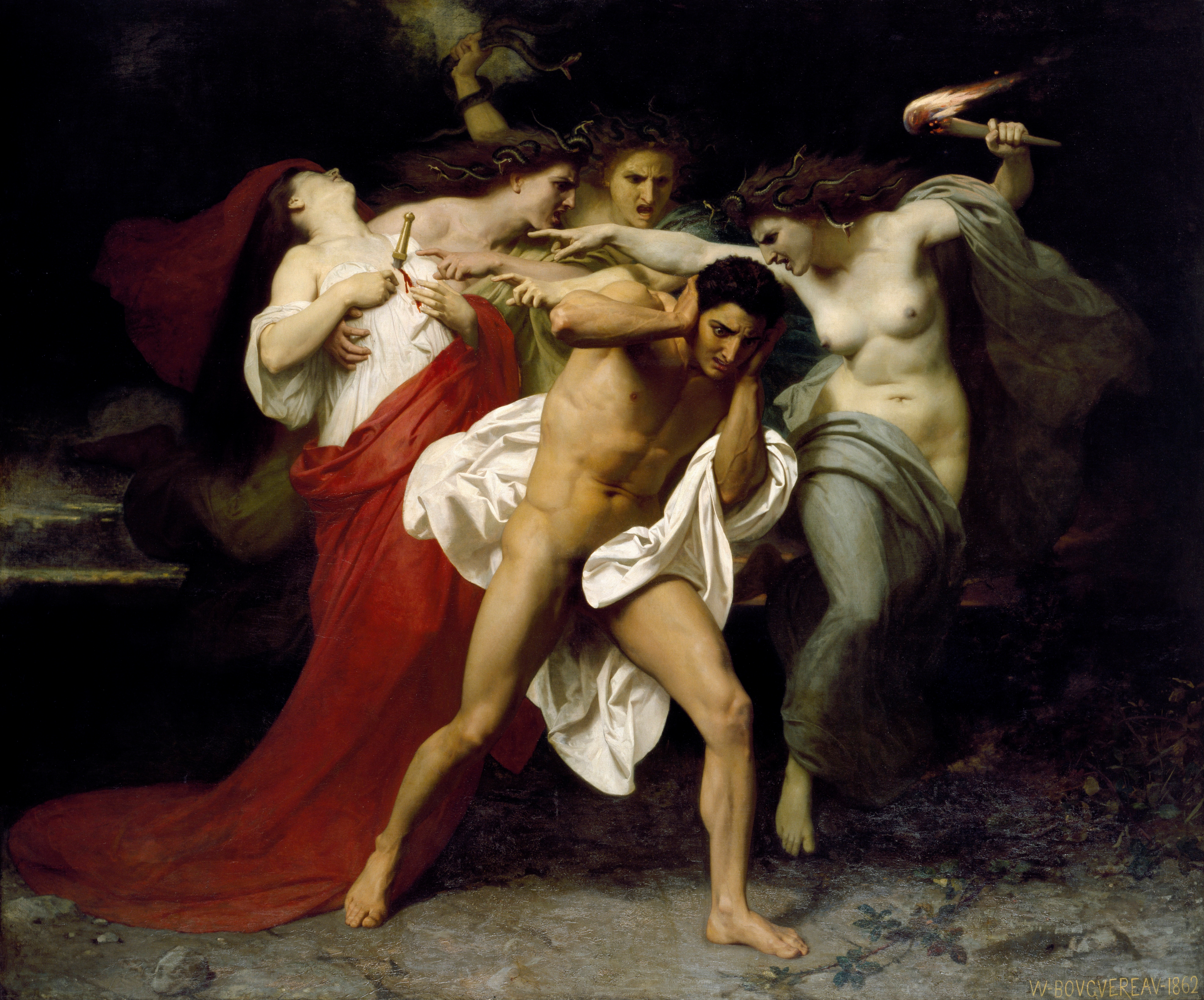
William-Adolphe Bouguereau, Orestes Pursued by the Furies (1862), Chrysler Museum of Art

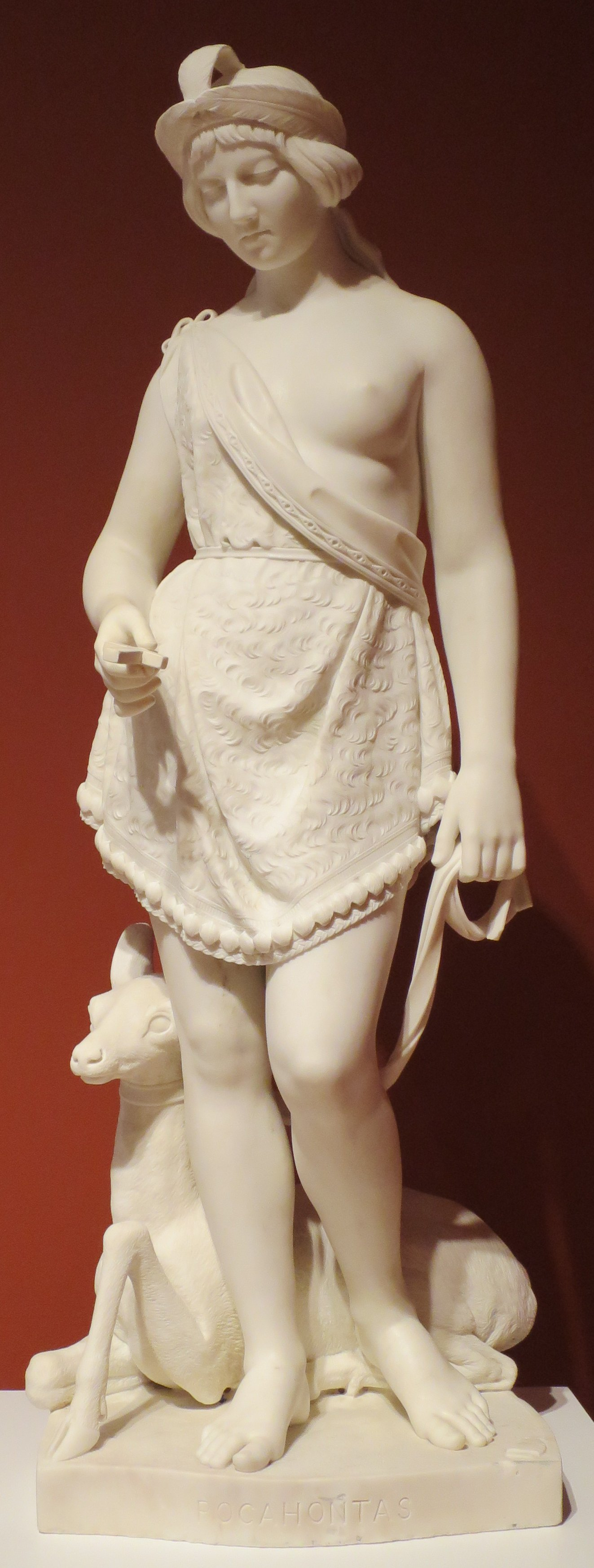
Joseph Mozier, Pocahontas (1864), High Museum of Art

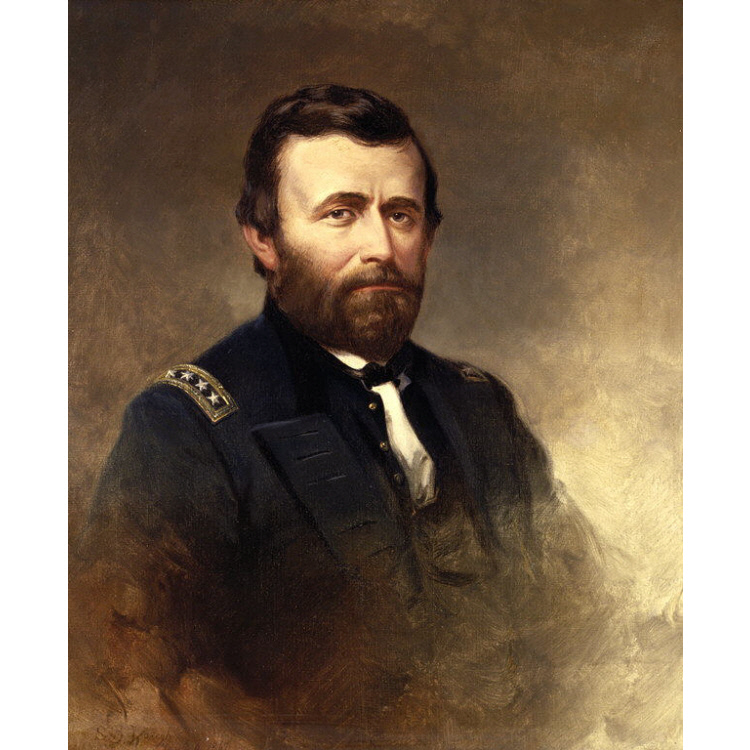
Samuel Bell Waugh, Ulysses S. Grant (1869), National Portrait Gallery

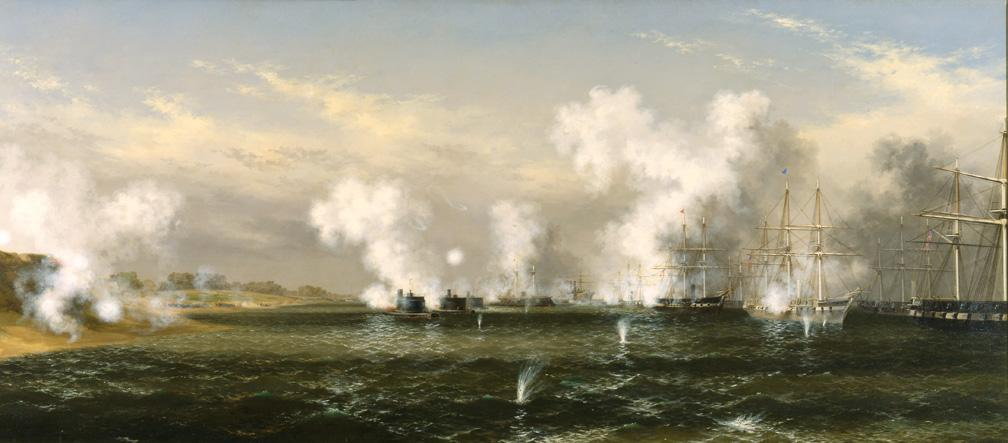
Xanthus Smith, Final Assault upon Fort Fisher, North Carolina (1872–1873), Pennsylvania Academy of the Fine Arts

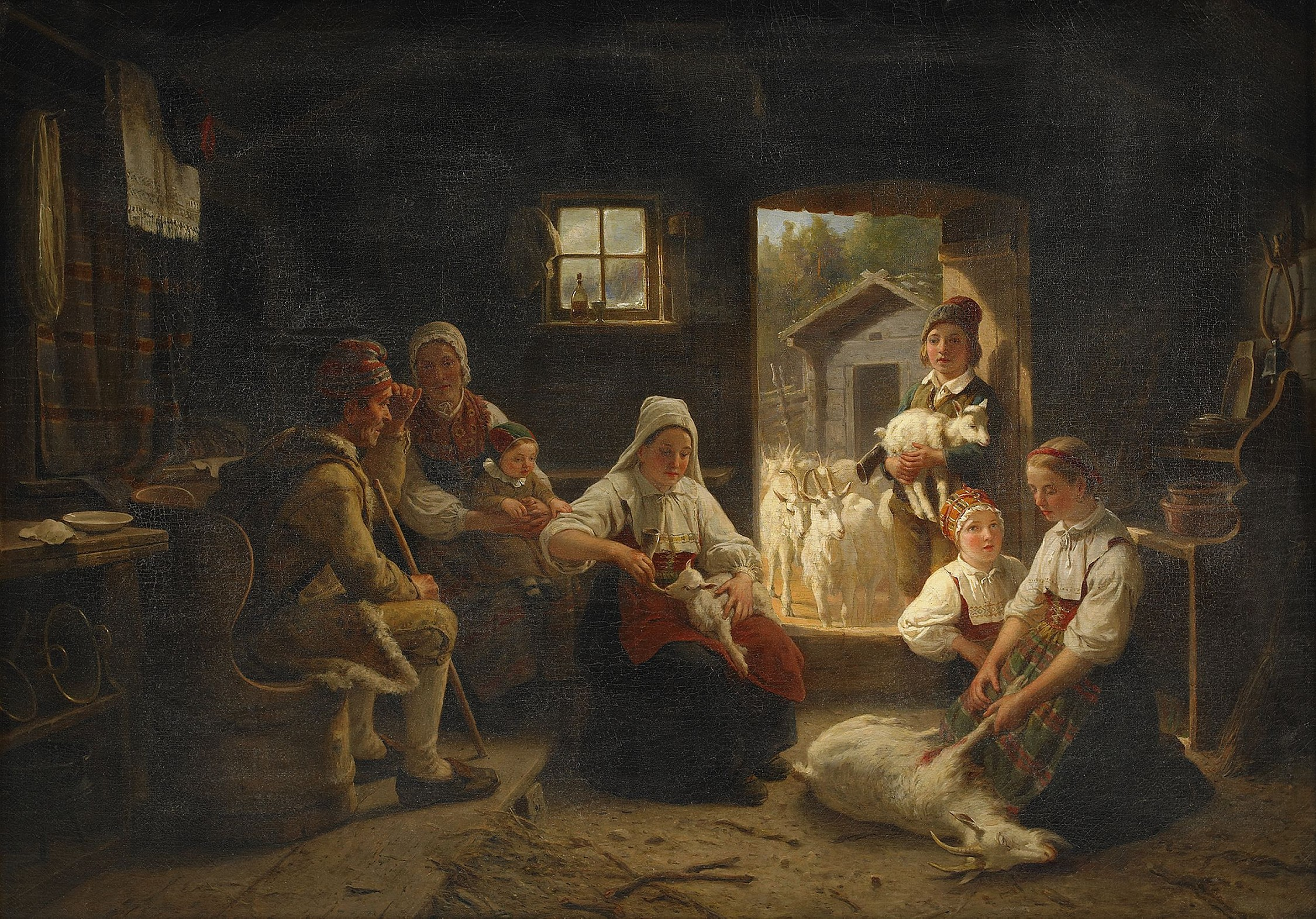
Bengt Nordenberg, (year), The Twins
