= Plumbush =

Historic house in New York, United States

- U.S. National Register of Historic Places
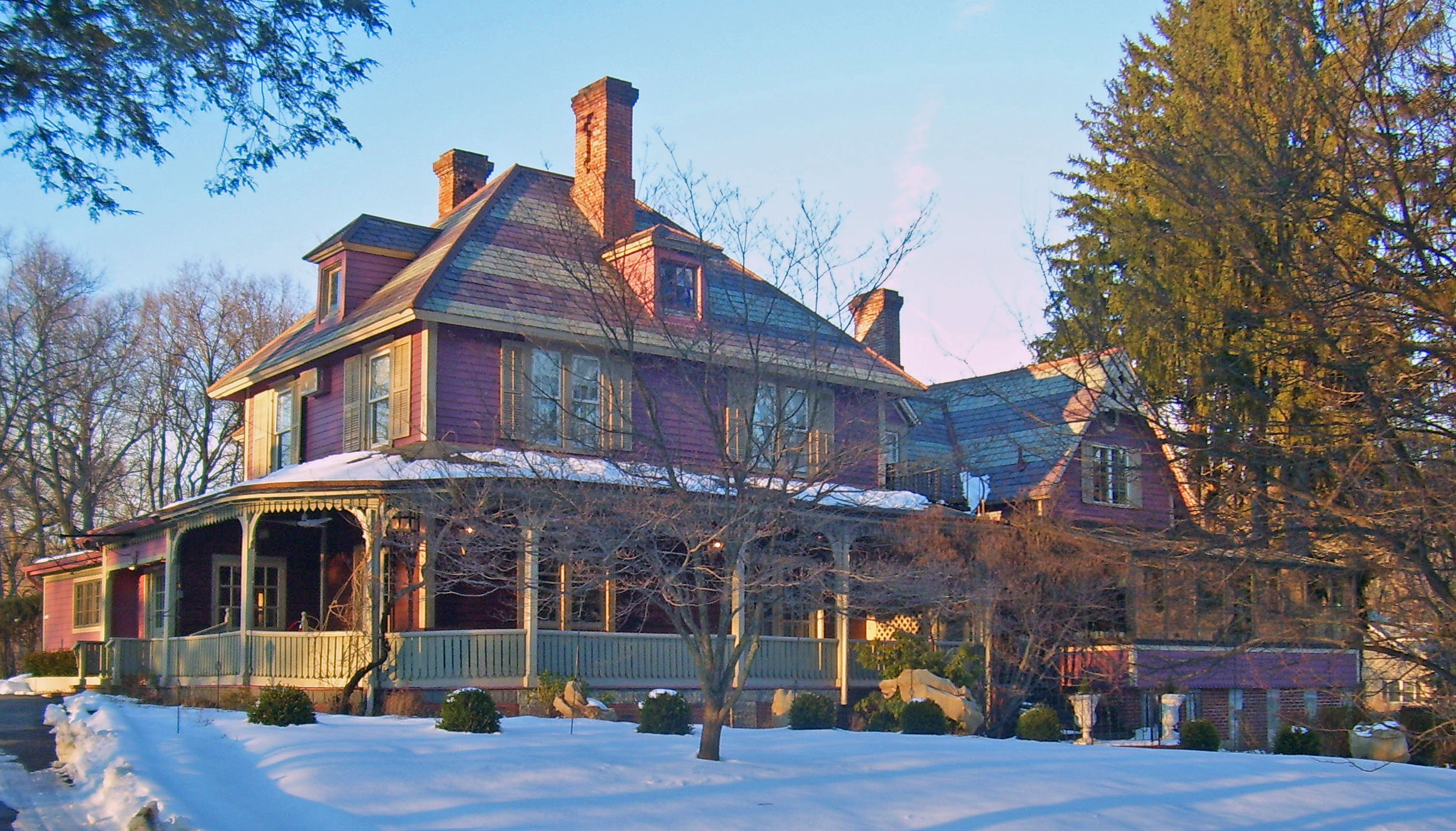
- Front elevation in 2008

- Location within New York Location within the United States
- Interactive map showing the location of Plumbush
- Location: Cold Spring, NY
- Nearest city: Beacon, Peekskill
- Coordinates: 41°25′06″N 73°56′35″W
- Area: 9.3 acres (3.8 ha)
- Built: 1865
- Architect: George Edward Harney
- Architectural style: Gothic Revival
- MPS: Hudson Highlands MRA
- NRHP reference No.: 82005386
- Added to NRHP: January 30, 1992

Plumbush is the former house and farm of Robert Parker Parrott, inventor of the Parrott gun. It is located at the junction of NY 9D and Peekskill Road south of Cold Spring, New York, United States.

The house was built for Parrott by local architect George Edward Harney in 1865, when he had taken over as superintendent of the nearby West Point Foundry. The property is listed on the National Register of Historic Places since 1992, due to its association with Parrott and Harney's interpretation of patterns by Andrew Jackson Downing.

== Buildings ==
The main Plumbush building is one of four located on a 9-acre (3.6 ha) parcel backed by Cold Spring Cemetery, the remnant of Parrott's original 65 acre (26 ha) farm, across Route 9D from the entrance to Fair Lawn, home of painter Thomas Prichard Rossiter. One of the other buildings, a wood house remodeled by Harney, has been further altered in the 21st century.

Harney's house consists of three rectangular sections, which remain largely intact today. The two-story 23 by 33-foot (7 by 10 m) main block is topped with a hipped roof shingled in patterned slate. A veranda with rounded corner is wrapped around the south and west sides. The other original sections are the 15-foot (5 m) square east wing and a one-story wing with gabled roof. Two other wings, added when the house was converted into a restaurant, are concealed from view and designed so as not to detract from the house's overall character.

Much of the original fenestration and ornamentation remains. Newer additions, such as a wrought-iron spiral staircase between the veranda and the second floor has, as with the additions, been designed to be sympathetic with what already exists.

=== Outbuildings ===
Three other buildings share Plumbush's lot. One, the former wood house, remains true enough to its original design to be considered a contributing resource. Its roof comes to a cupola that itself has a flat roof. The interior has been substantially renovated so that it serves as a residence.

The former carriage house, which now serves as a garage is probably original to the property but has undergone extensive renovation and no longer retains its original integrity. A larger house near the rear of the property was built in the mid-20th century.

== Aesthetic ==
George Edward Harney built the house along Picturesque lines, suggested by patterns in books by the influential Andrew Jackson Downing, who had lived in Newburgh, just up the river, until his death in an 1852 steamboat explosion. Downing's pattern books influenced many mid-19th century Gothic Revival and Carpenter Gothic cottages in the Hudson Valley and elsewhere.

Andrew Jackson Downing advocated rural cottages that were harmonious with the local natural environment, a "local fitness and an intimate relationship with the soil it stands upon" rather than challenging it as the blocky Federal and Greek Revival homes of earlier decades had. Harney carefully adapted the house to the site, in accordance with Downing's philosophies, putting the veranda next to a grove of trees and making sure the nearby Hudson River and the Hudson Highlands beyond could be seen from the upper windows.

The house itself shows Downing's influence in the irregularity and asymmetry of its three main blocks. The varied rooflines, truncated and cross gables, large veranda and chimneys decorated with medieval crosses are also found in many of Downing's patterns.

In 1870 George Edward Harney published a book of his own, Barns, Outbuildings and Fences, with the original plans and sketches for Plumbush. His designs show the clear influence of some of the patterns shown in Downing's The Architecture of Country Houses.

== History ==
Robert Parker Parrott, was one of the earliest settlers of Cold Spring and a graduate of the nearby United States Military Academy at West Point, served as the foundry's inspector general for the Army during the Civil War. After it ended, foundry owner Gouverneur Kemble persuaded him to resign from the Army and take over as superintendent of the foundry.

In 1839 Parrott married Mary Kemble, niece of Gouverneur Kemble, founder of the ironworks, and moved into Plumbush. He died in 1877. In 1971 Plumbush was converted into a restaurant, and in 2014 the main Plumbush building and one of the outbuildings were extensively renovated and occupied by The Manitou School, a private elementary school.
