= George Edward Harney =

American architect (1839–1924)

George E. Harney
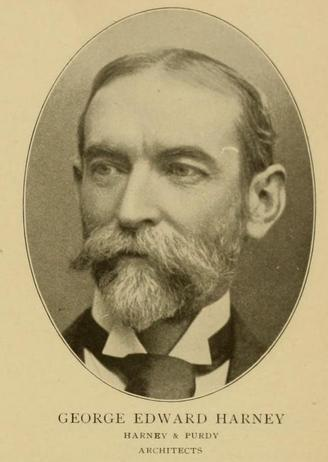
- George E. Harney, circa 1899
- Born: September 1, 1839; Lynn, Massachusetts
- Died: November 12, 1924 (aged 85); New York City
- Occupation: Architect

George E. Harney FAIA (September 1, 1839 – November 12, 1924) was a late 19th-century American architect based in New York City.

== Biography ==
George Edward Harney was born September 1, 1839, in Lynn, Massachusetts, to George Ballard Harney and Mary Johnson Harney. He was educated privately and at the Lynn High School. After leaving the high school he studied architecture in the office of Alonzo Lewis, an architect and engineer of Lynn. During this time in Lynn he published several designs for improvements to country estates in periodicals such as the New England Farmer and The Horticulturist, which as an anonymous biographer wrote in 1898, "proved to be the foundation of his business career."

In 1863 he came to Cold Spring, New York, on the Hudson River to assist Horticulturist editors Peter B. Mead and George E. Woodward with designing the Cold Spring Cemetery. After completing the gatehouse, Harney remained to establish his practice there. Though he was never solely an architect of country houses, his prior experience led them to become a staple of his practice for the rest of his career. Due to the success of the West Point Foundry in developing the village, Harney attained several house commissions in Cold Spring from prominent community figures. One was the Foundry's head, Robert Parker Parrott, for whom Harney designed a farm, known as Plumbush, and its outbuildings in 1865.

After settling in Cold Spring, he established a second office upriver in Newburgh. From this office, he designed and remodeled several country houses in Orange County.

In 1870 he authored Stables, Outbuildings and Fences, a book of designs for outbuildings on country estates, and in 1873 was editor of the fifth edition of Andrew Jackson Downing's Cottage Residences, originally published in 1842. For this work he provided designs for eight cottages and a church and solicited others from architects including Frederick Clarke Withers, Downing's former assistant, and Arthur Gilman.

In 1873 he moved his home and practice to New York City and was soon after commissioned by Adele L. S. Stevens to design a store for Brooks Brothers at Broadway and Bond Street. He briefly formed the partnership of Harney & Paulding with architect William I. Paulding of Cold Spring, but this only lasted a year. In New York Harney developed a successful practice, designing office buildings and city and country houses. Circa 1891 Harney formed the partnership of Harney & Purdy with his associate, William S. Purdy, with whom he would practice for the rest of his career.

Harney retired from practice in 1910. His partner, Purdy, continued the practice under his own name until his death in 1920.

== Personal life ==
Harney was married in 1872 to Maria Renshaw Jaques of Boston. She died in 1887. Harney was a member of the Century Association, the American Federation of Arts and the American Institute of Architects (AIA), into which he was admitted as a fellow in 1871. Harney died November 12, 1924, in New York City at the age of 85. He was buried in the Cold Spring Cemetery at his former home of Cold Spring.

== Legacy ==
The anonymous author of his AIA obituary wrote that he was "an architect of the older school [and a] scholar and practitioner of the highest ideals." Several of his works have been listed on the United States National Register of Historic Places.

== Selected architectural works ==
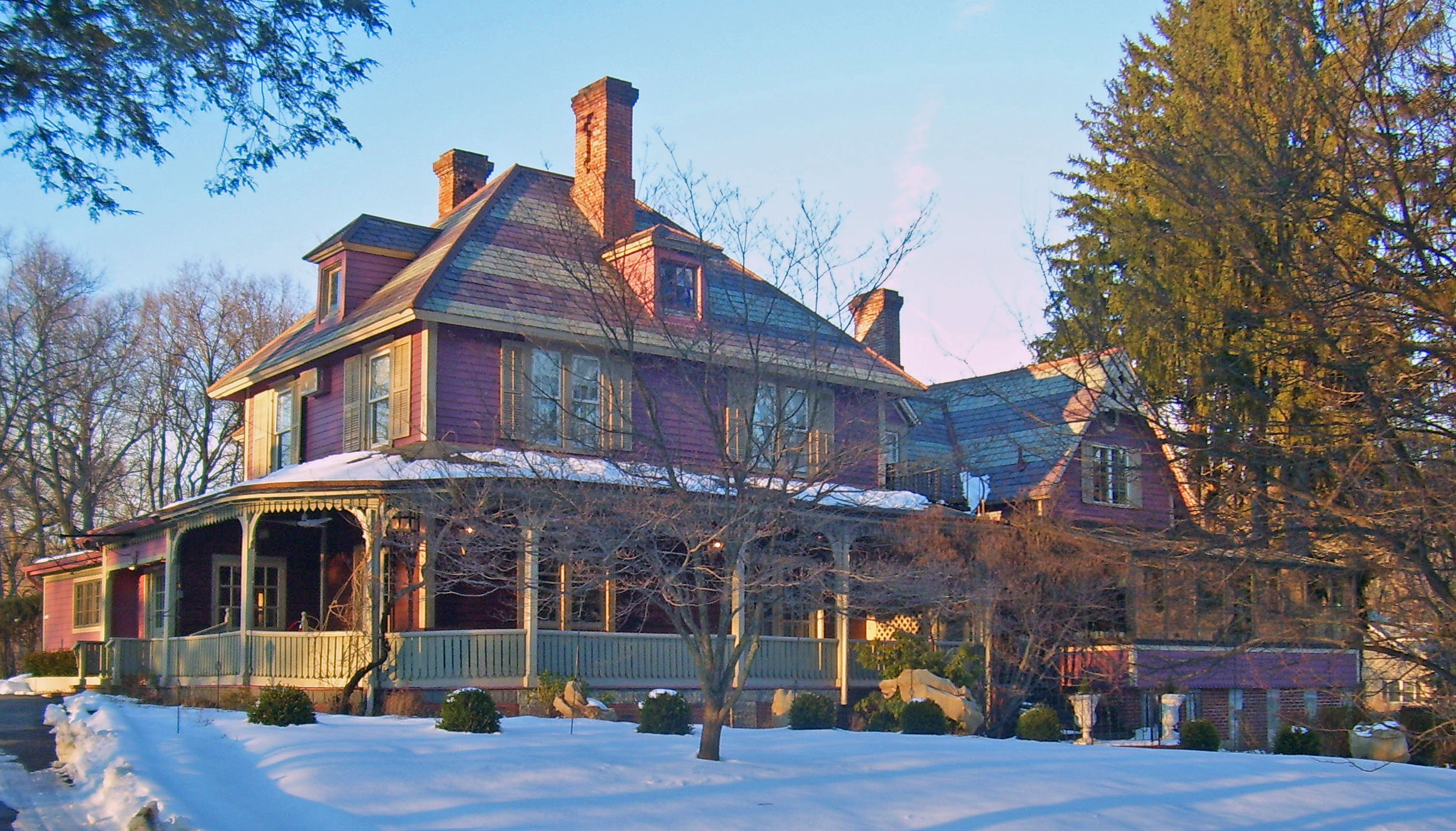
- Plumbush, the home of Robert Parker Parrott, in Cold Spring, New York, designed by Harney and completed in 1865.
  Cold Spring Cemetery Gatehouse, Nelsonville, NY (1863)
- Wilson House, Garrison, NY (1865)
- Robert Parker Parrott House, "Plumbush," Cold Spring, NY (1865)
- Remodeling of 8 Chestnut Street, Cold Spring, NY (1866–67)
- Transept and extension, Dutch Reformed Church, Newburgh, NY (1867–68)
- Episcopal Church of St. Mary-in-the-Highlands, Cold Spring, NY (1867–68)
- Wade House, Fishkill, NY (1867–68)
- St. Paul's Episcopal Church, Wallingford, CT (1868–69)
- Unitarian Church of Our Father, Newburgh, NY (1869–70)
- Laura A. Fellows House, "Overdell," Balmville, NY (1869–70, demolished)
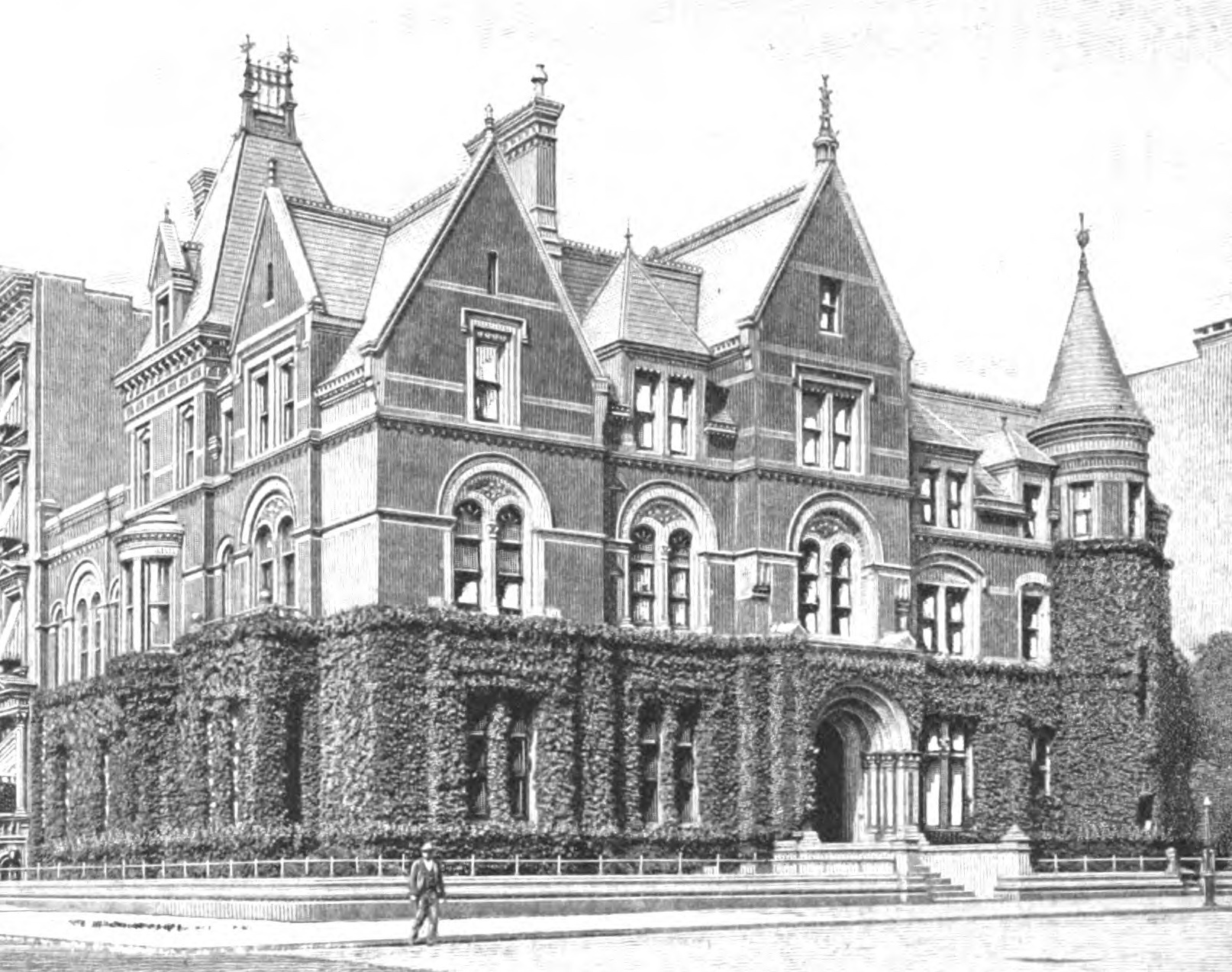
  The demolished Frederic W. Stevens house in New York City, designed by Harney & Paulding and completed in 1875.
- St. Mary's Episcopal Church and Rectory, East Providence, RI (1870)
- Remodeling and outbuildings, Harriet Musgrave House, New Windsor, NY (1871)
- John B. J. Fenton House, Balmville, NY (1871, demolished)
- Christ Episcopal Church, Brentwood, Long Island, NY (1871)
- Chapel, St. Peter's Episcopal Church, Salem, MA (1871–72)
- St. Mary's Parish House, Cold Spring, NY (1872–74)
- Brooks Brothers Store, 670 Broadway, New York, NY (1873–74)
- Frederic W. Stevens House, 2 W. 57th St., New York, NY (1874–75, demolished)
- Reformed Episcopal Church of the Corner Stone, Newburgh, NY (1875–76)
- Children's Chime Tower, Stockbridge, MA (1878)
- Stevens Building, 18 Wall St., New York, NY (1879, demolished)
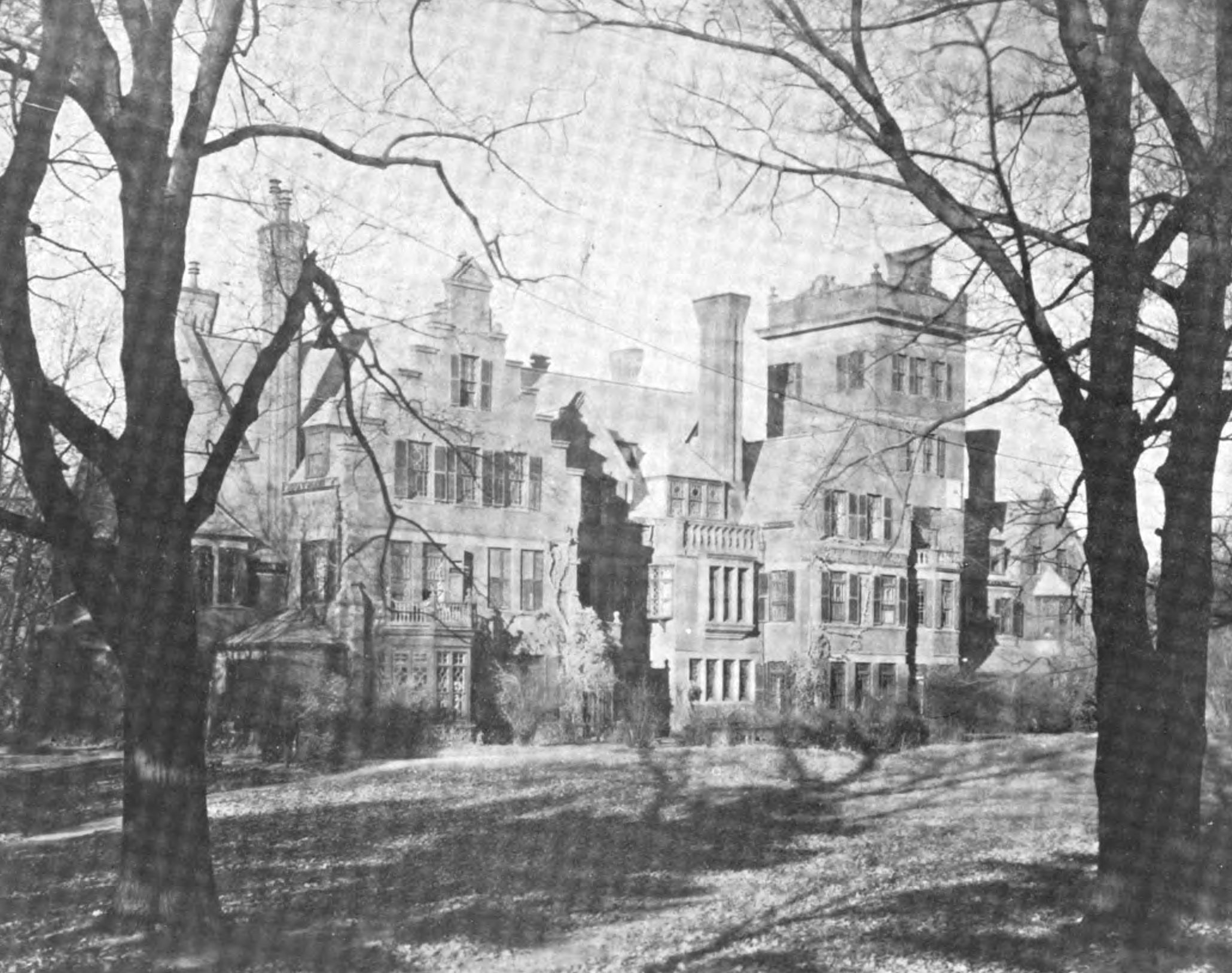
- Southwood estate in Brookline, Massachusetts, designed by Harney and completed in 1882.
  Barthold Schlesinger House, "Southwood," Brookline, MA (1880–82)
- Luther Kountze House, "Delbarton," Morristown, NJ (1883)
- Commercial Union Assurance Co. Building, 46 Pine St., New York, NY (1883, demolished)
- Eagle Insurance Company Building, 71 Wall St., New York, NY (1884, demolished)
- John Ballantine House, Newark, NJ (1885)
- Moffat Library, Washingtonville, NY (1887)
- South Highland United Methodist Church, Garrison, NY (1887)
- George Bruce Memorial Library, 226 W. 42nd St., New York, NY (1887, demolished)
- George E. Dodge House, 27 W. 57th St., New York, NY (1888, demolished)
- Hotel Champlain, Plattsburgh, NY (1888–90, burned 1910)
- Washington A. Roebling House, Trenton, NJ (1889–92, demolished 1946)
- M. R. Townsend Houses, 3–5 E. 10th St., New York, NY (1890)
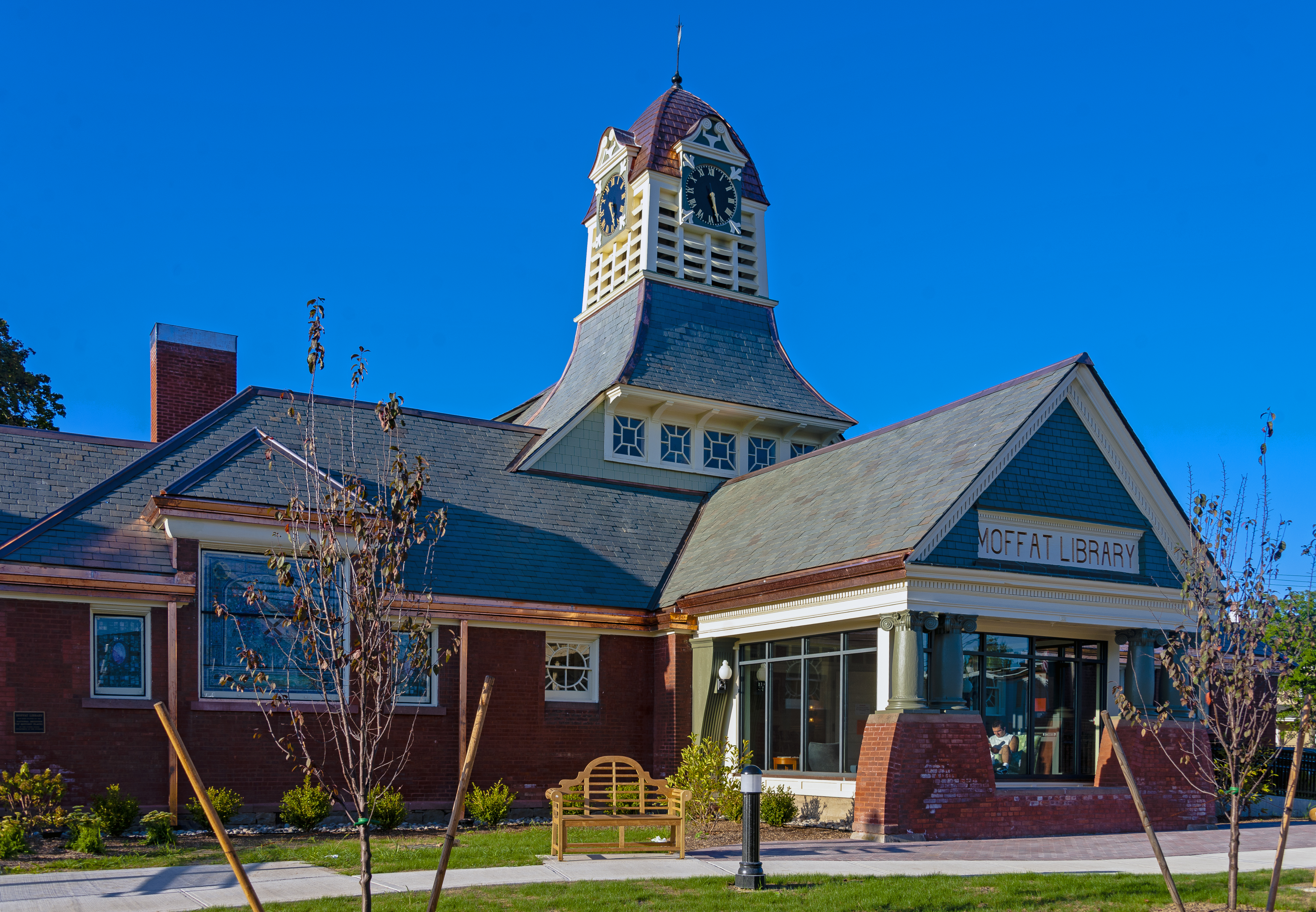
- The Moffat Library in Washingtonville, New York, designed by Harney and completed in 1887.
  Mercantile Library Building, 13 Astor Pl., New York, NY (1890–91)
- Delaware and Hudson Railroad Depot, Scranton, PA (1893–99, demolished)
- Henry M. Day House, "Meadow Beach," Southampton, NY (1893, altered)
- Helena Flint House, Larchmont, NY (1894)
- God's Providence House, 330 Broome St., New York, NY (1894)
- Lincoln Safety Deposit Co. Warehouses, 60 E. 42nd St., New York, NY (1894, demolished)
- George E. Dodge House, Tuxedo Park, NY (1898, demolished)
- Lincoln Hospital and Home, Bronx, NY (1898, demolished)
- Robert Olyphant House, 16 E. 52nd St., New York, NY (1900, demolished)
- D&H Railroad Depot, Saratoga Springs, NY (1900, demolished)
- Toucey Memorial Parish House, St. Philip's Church, Garrison, NY (1900)
- Commercial Union Assurance Co. Annex, 60 William St., New York, NY (1903, demolished)
- Fort William Henry Hotel (Addition), 48 Canada St., Lake George, NY (1908, burned 1909)

== Published works ==
- George E. Harney, Stables, Outbuildings and Fences (New York: George E. Woodward, 1870)
- Andrew Jackson Downing, Cottage Residences, 5th edition, ed. George E. Harney (New York: John Wiley & Son, 1873)

== Gallery ==
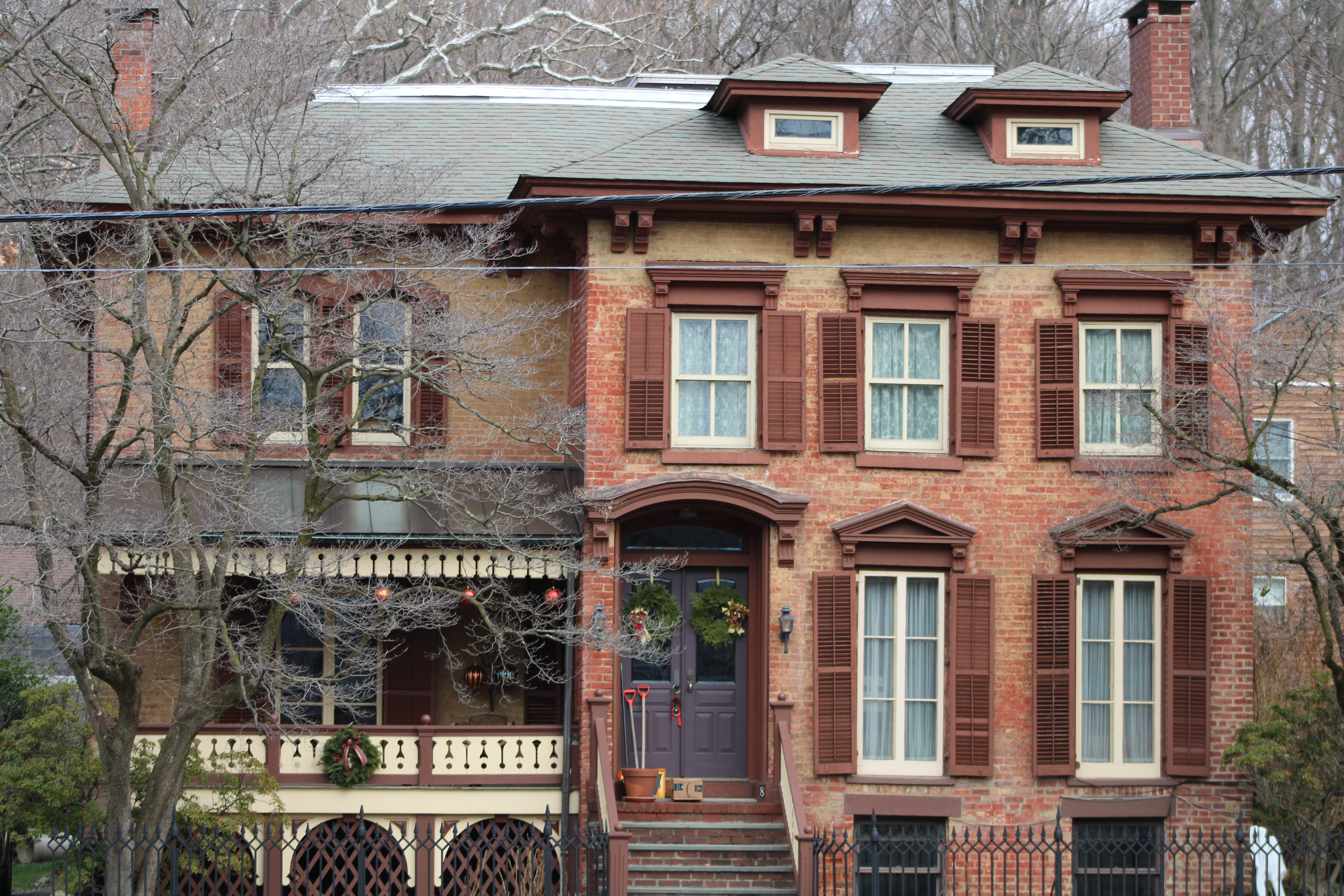
8 Chestnut Street (1866–67)

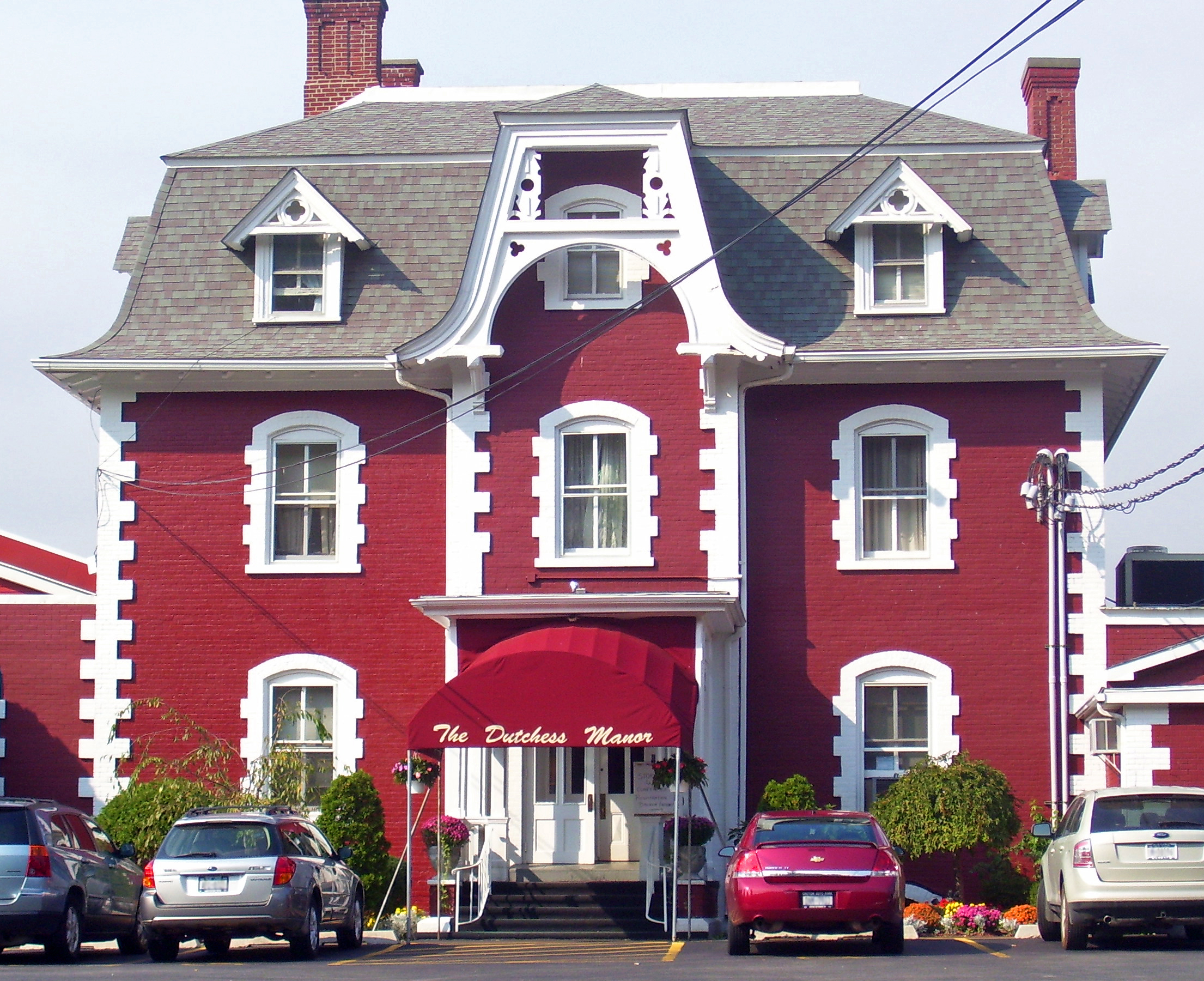
Wade House (1867–68)

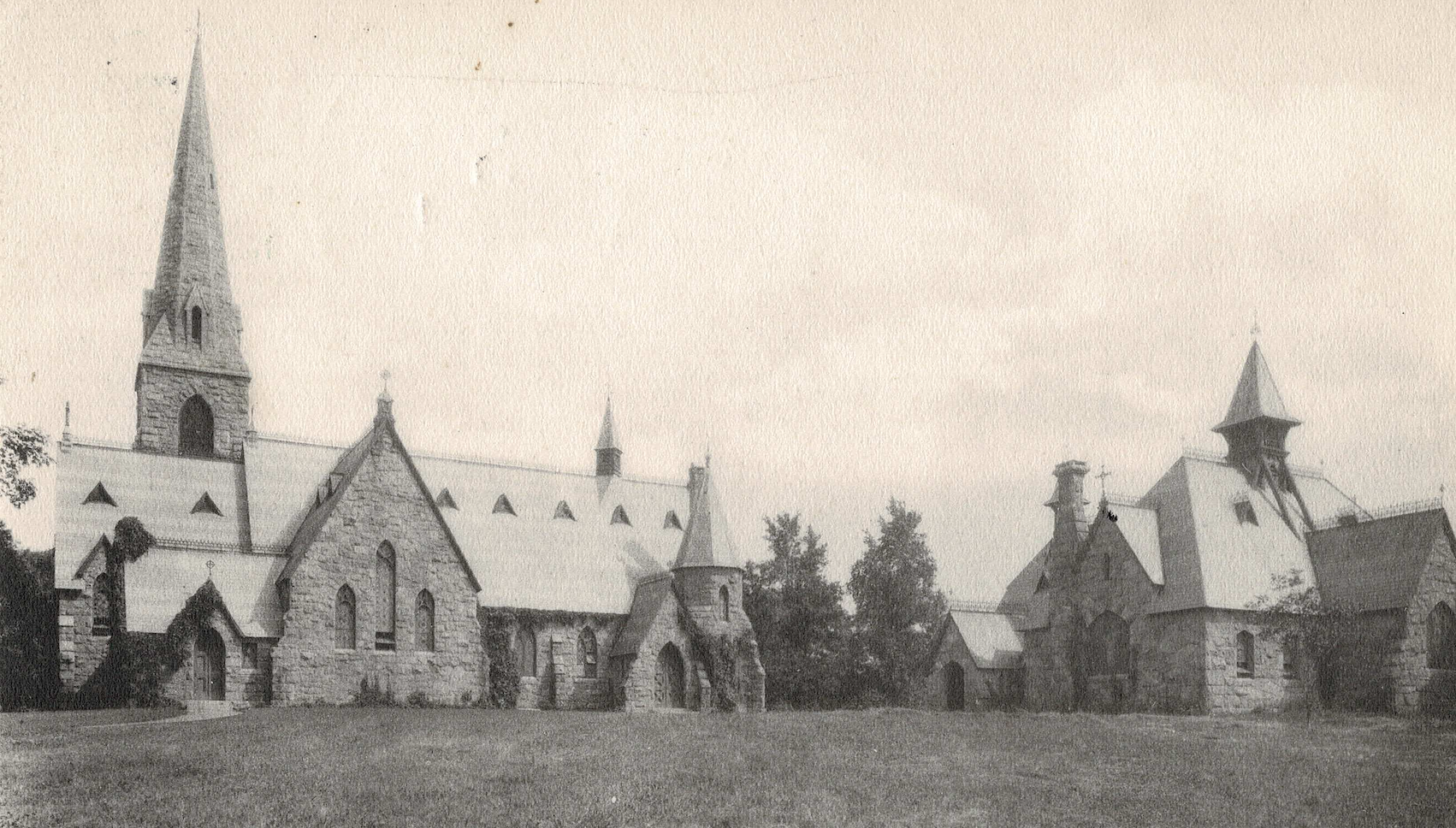
Episcopal Church of St. Mary-in-the-Highlands (1867–68) and Parish House (1872–74)

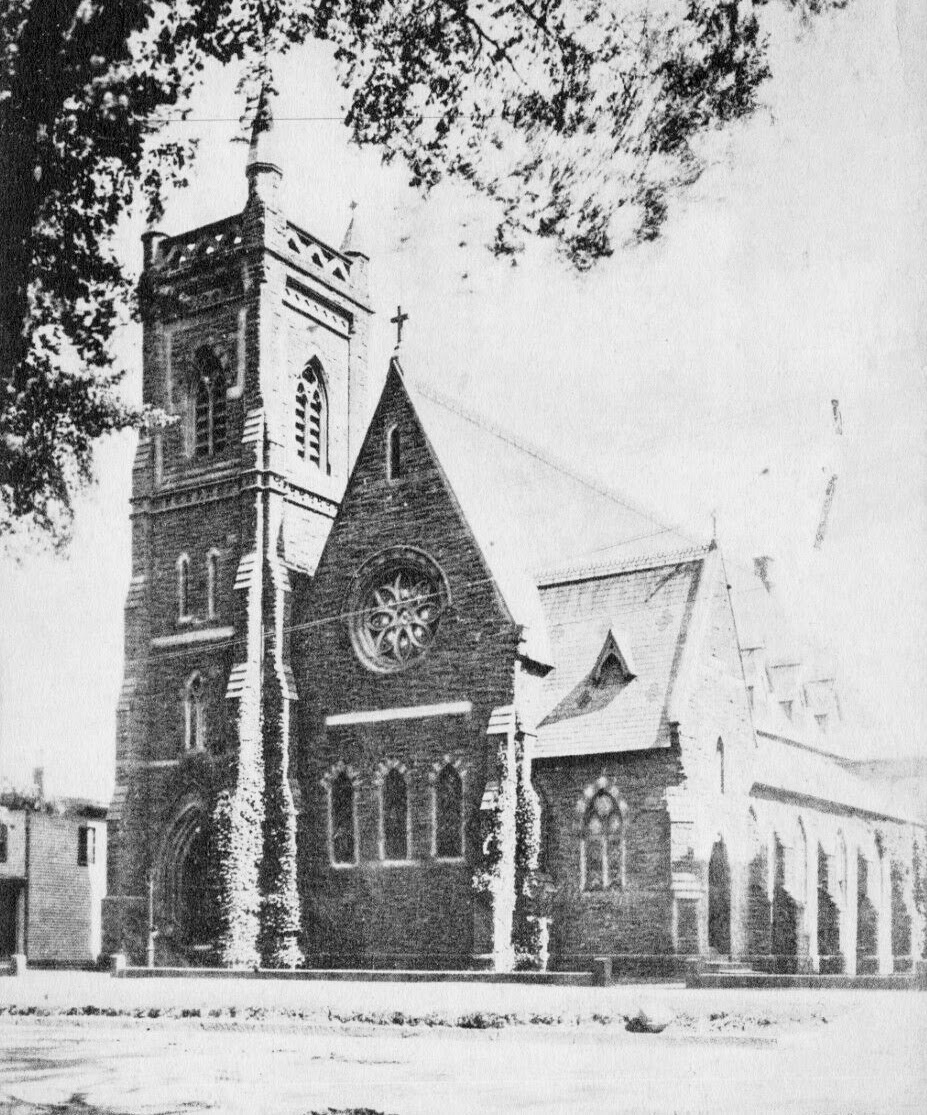
St. Paul's Episcopal Church (1868–69)

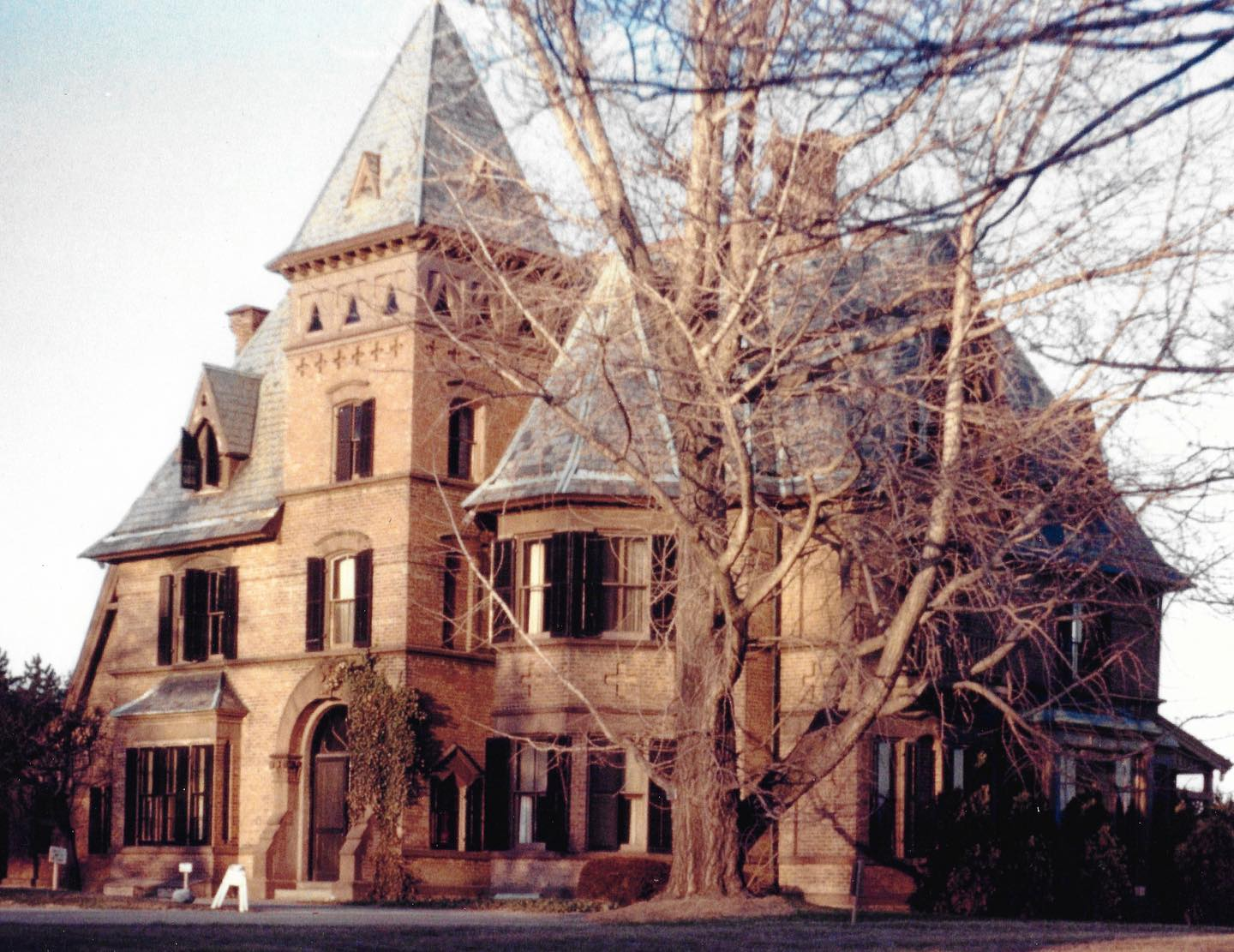
Laura A. Fellows House, "Overdell" (1869)

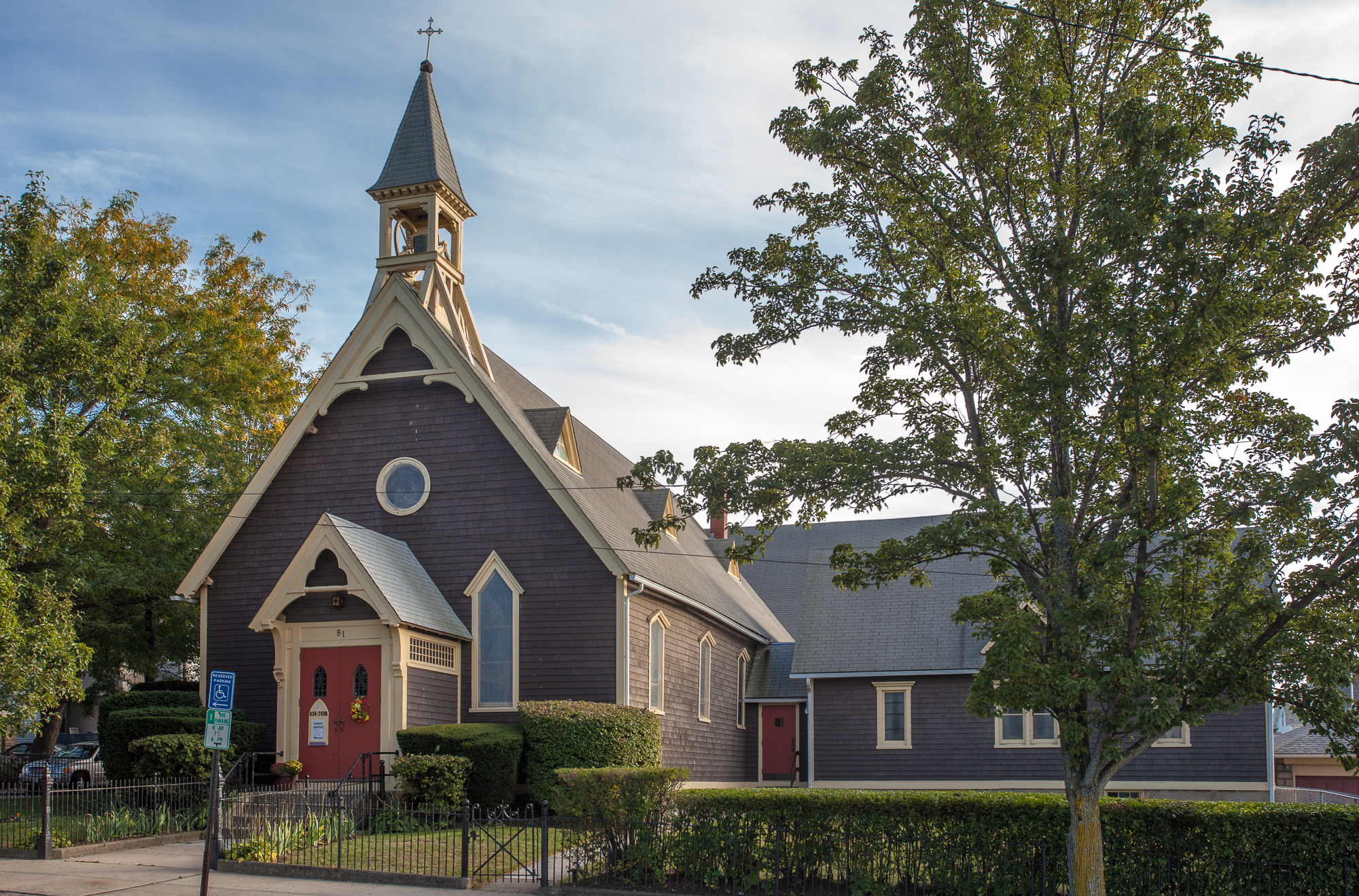
St. Mary's Episcopal Church (1870)

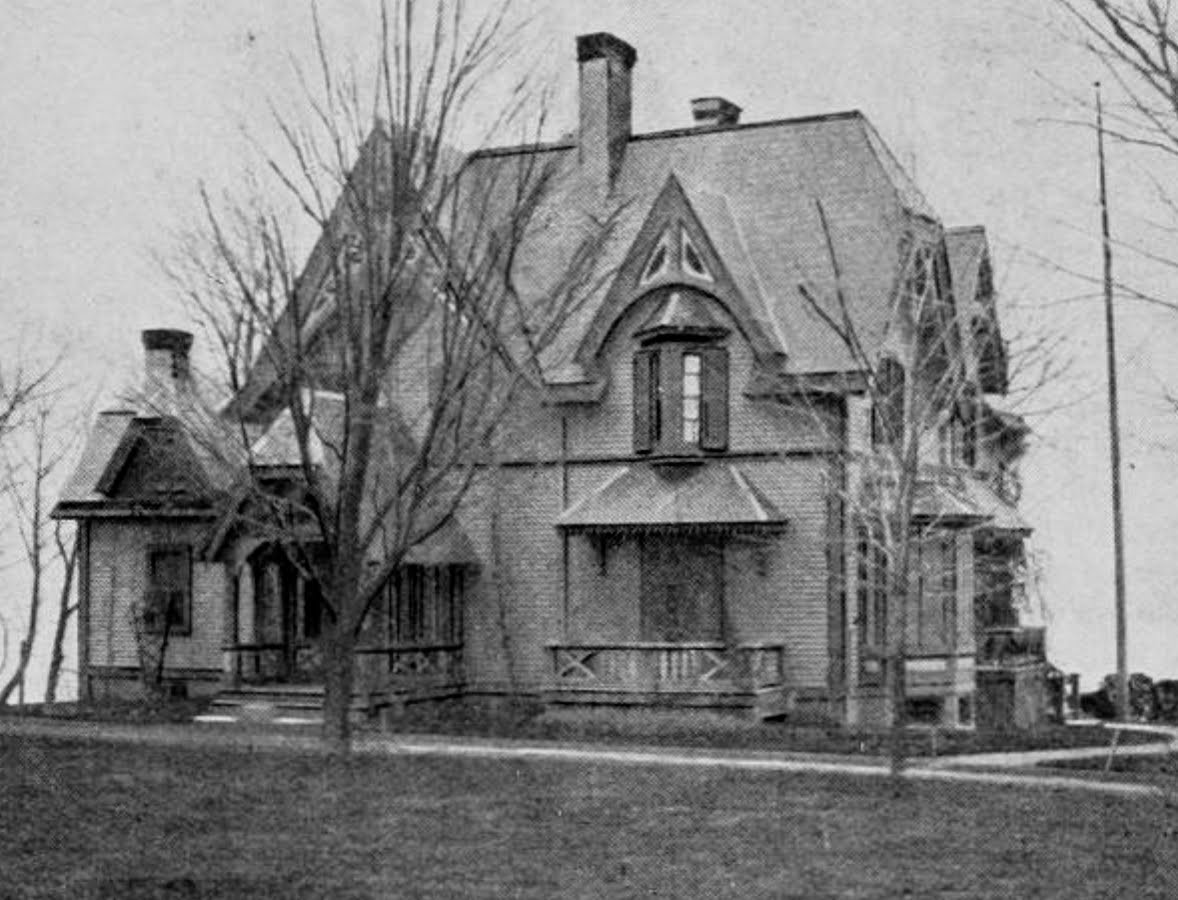
John B. J. Fenton House (1871)

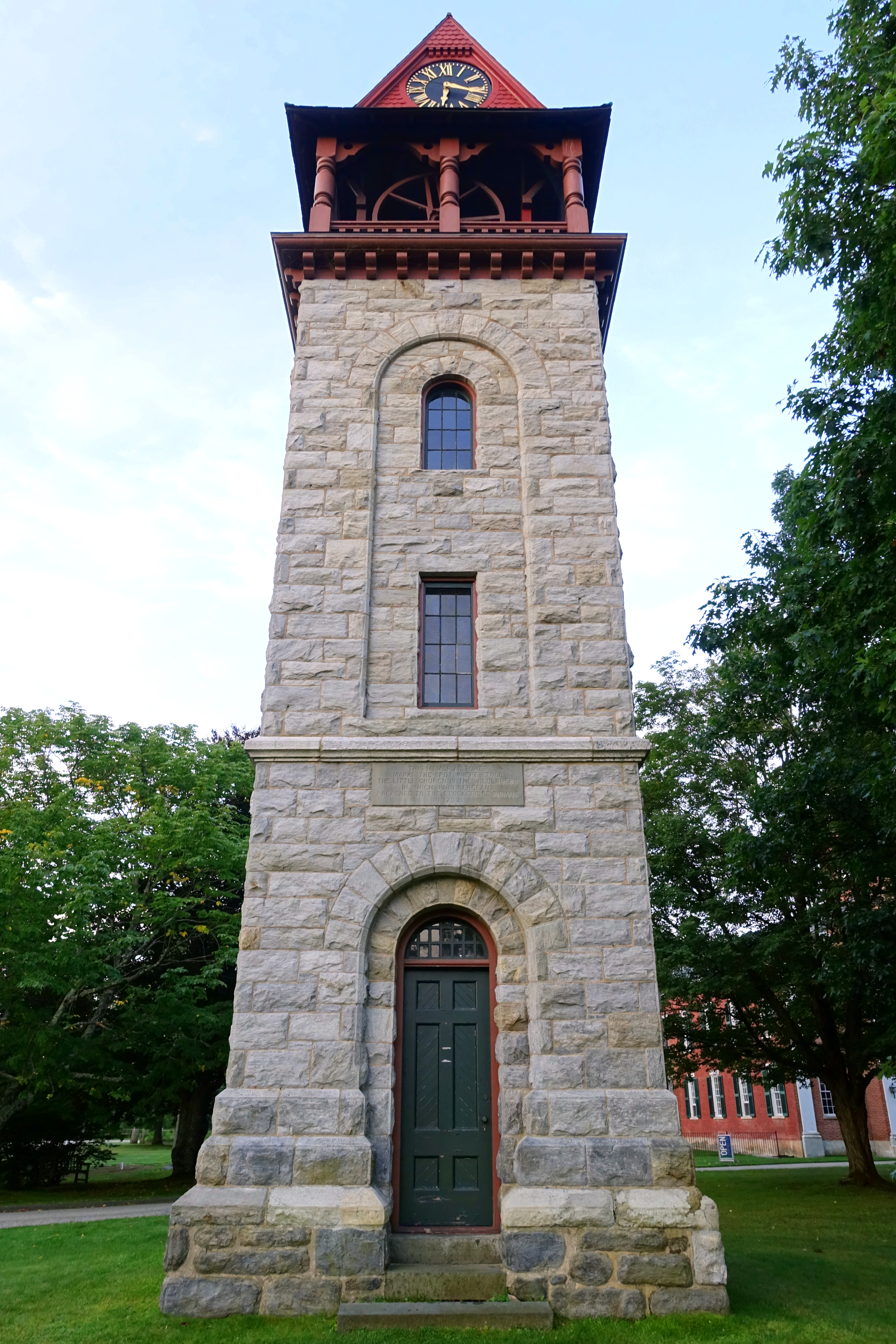
Children's Chime Tower (1878)

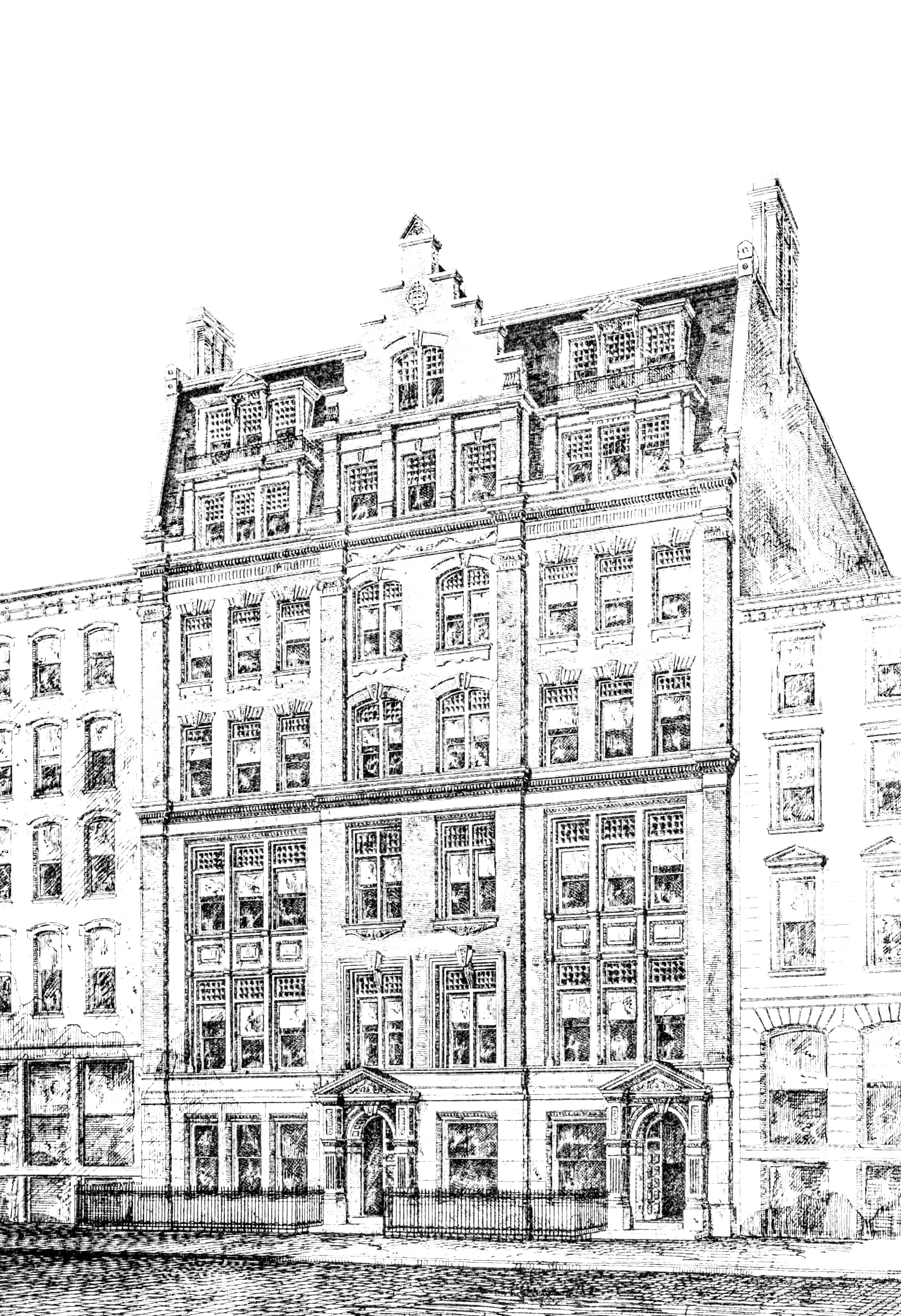
Stevens Building (1879)

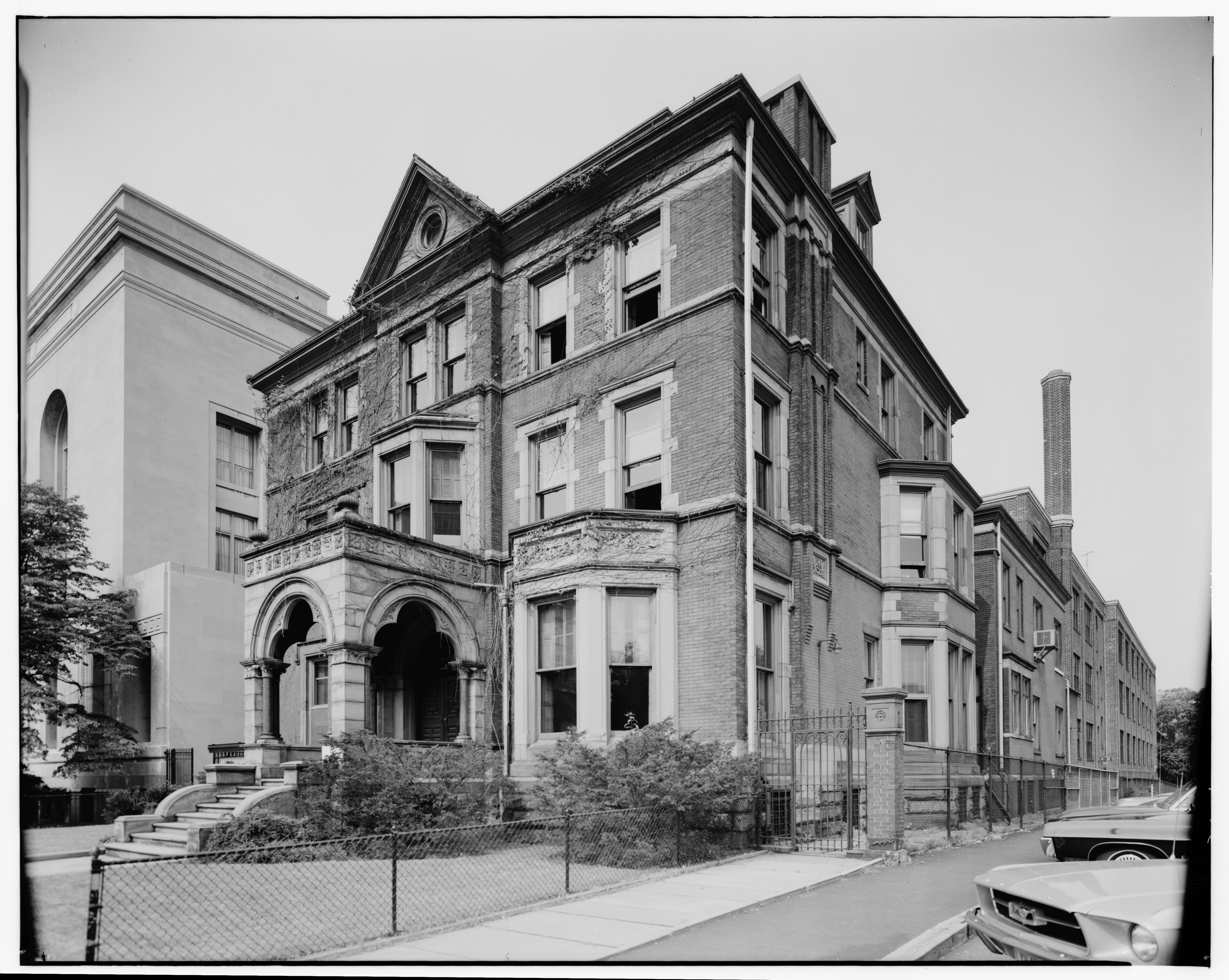
John H. Ballantine House (1885)

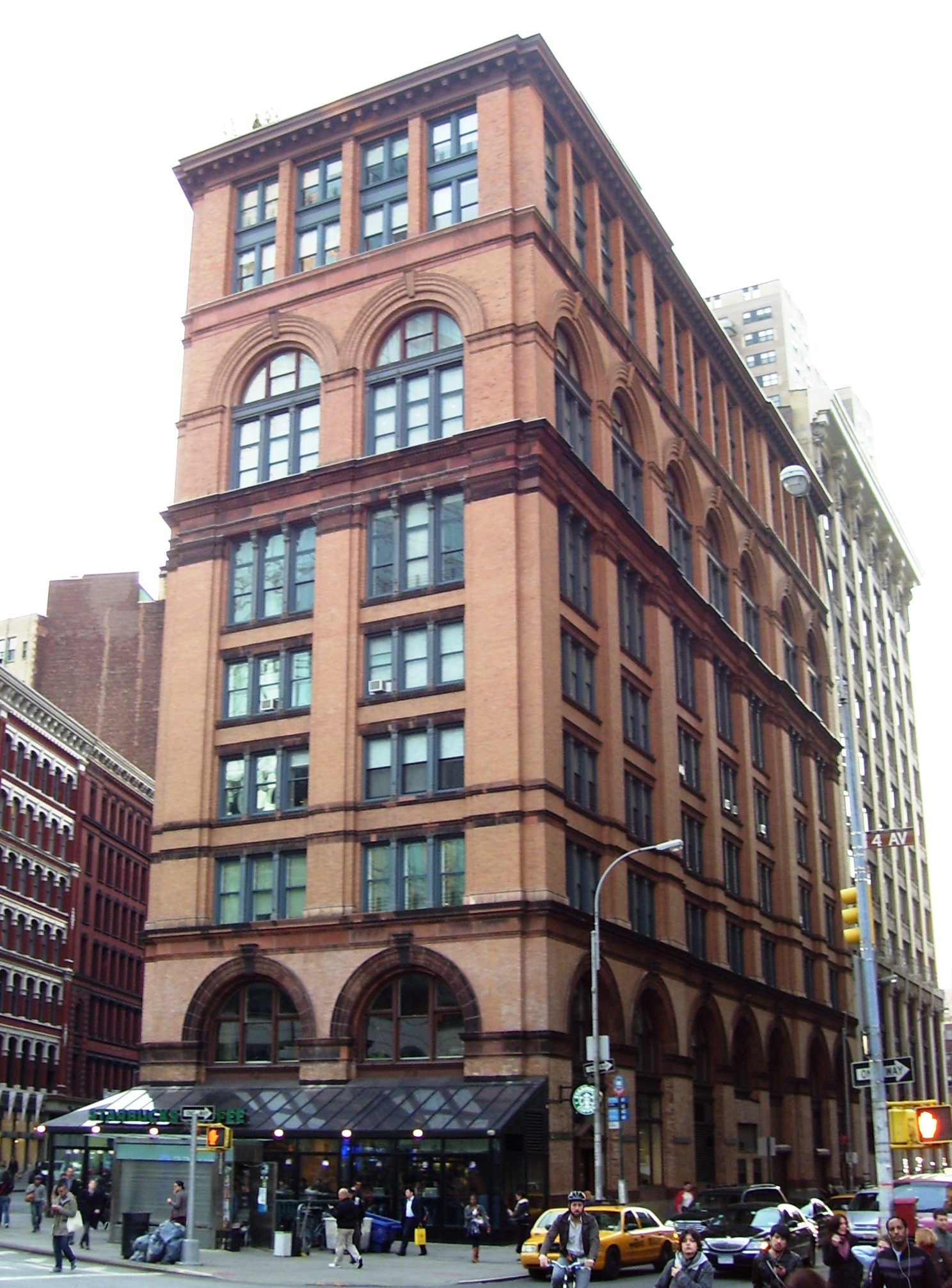
Mercantile Library Building (1890–91)

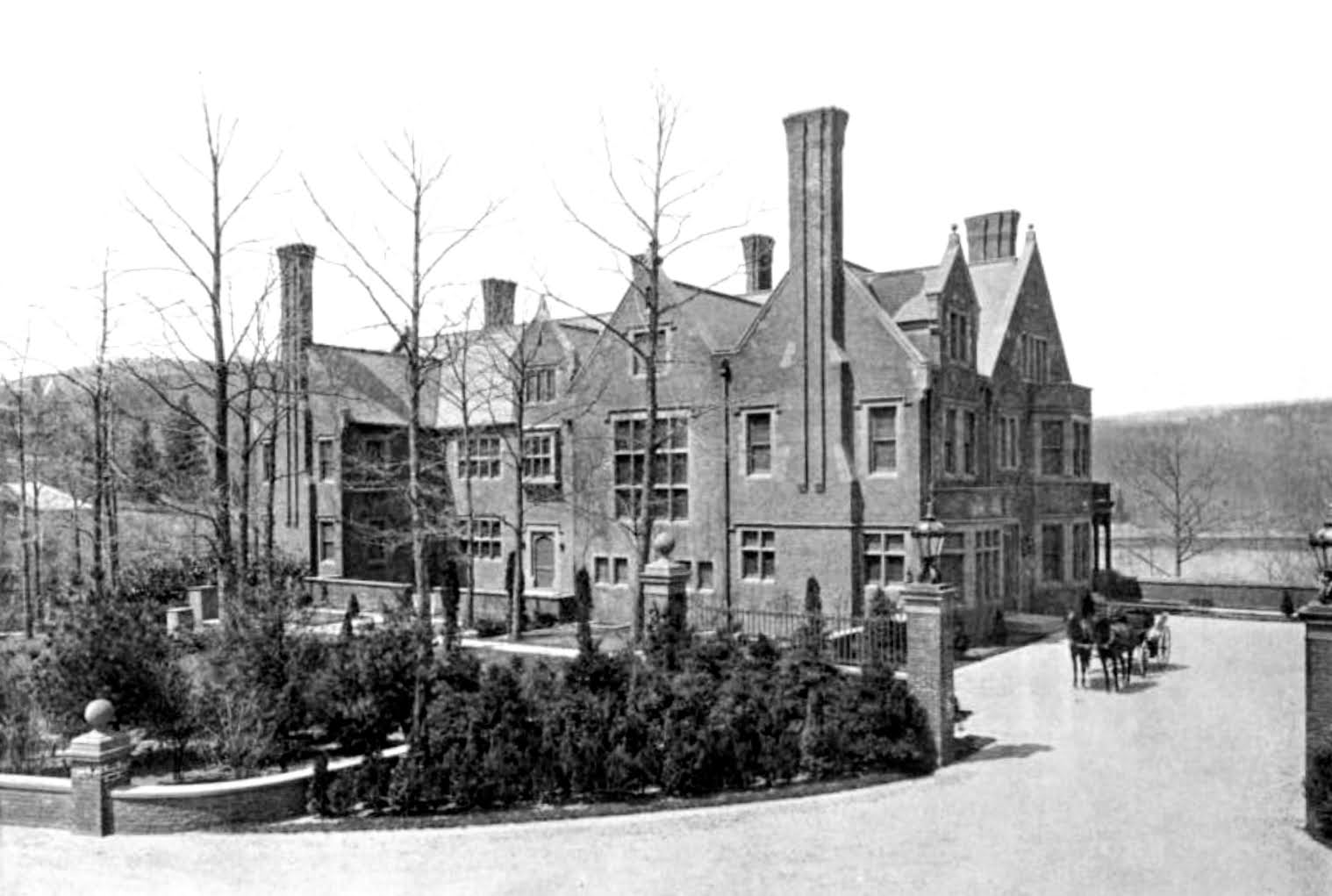
George E. Dodge House (1898)
