= Fair Lawn (Cold Spring, New York) =

Historic house in New York, United States

- U.S. National Register of Historic Places
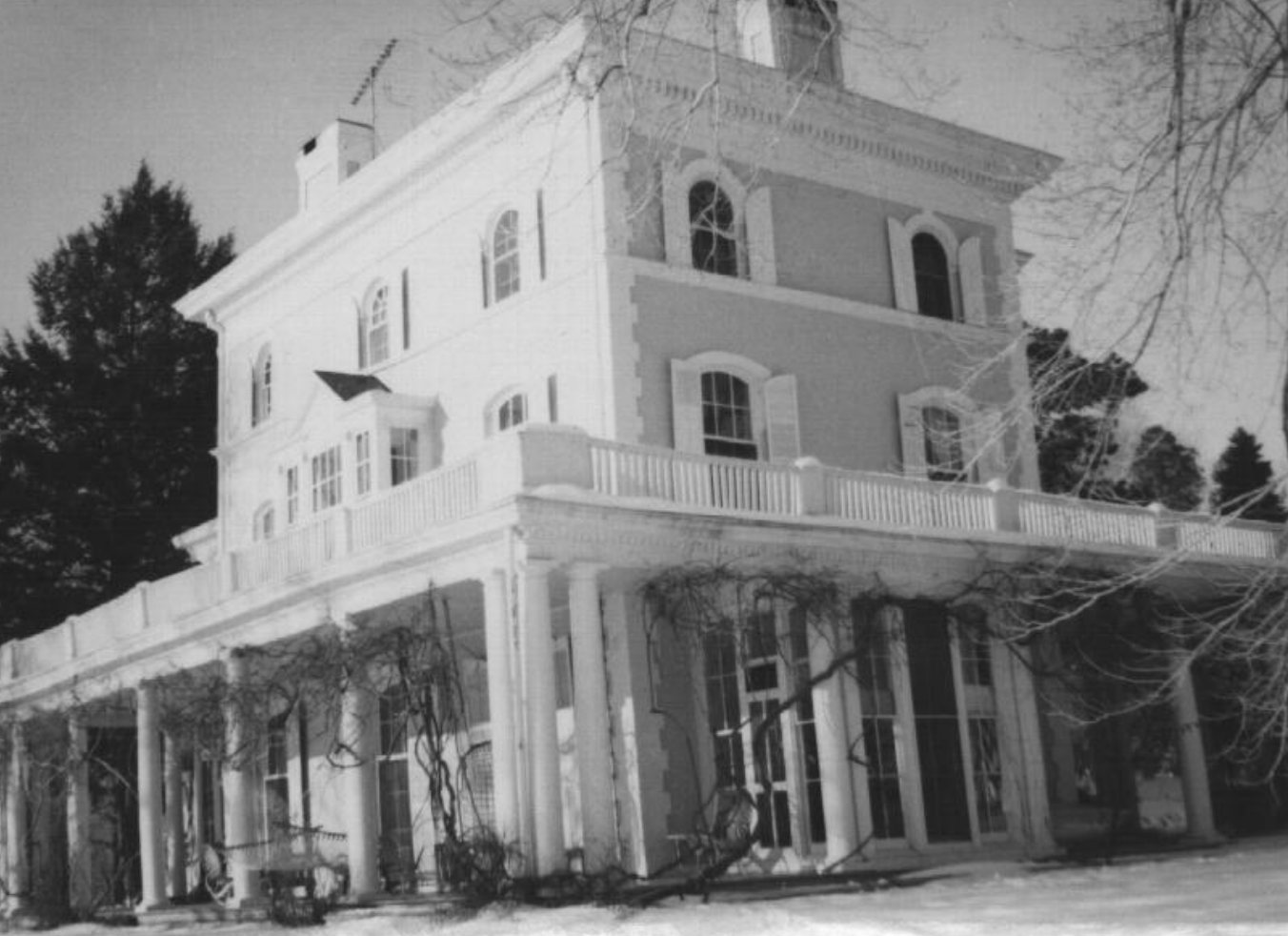
- West elevation, 1982
- Location: Cold Spring, NY
- Coordinates: 41°24′58″N 73°56′38″W
- Area: 68.1 acres (27.6 ha)
- Built: 1860
- Architect: Thomas Prichard Rossiter
- Architectural style: Italianate
- MPS: Hudson Highlands MRA
- NRHP reference No.: 82001240
- Added to NRHP: November 23, 1982

Fair Lawn is a house located off NY 9D just south of Cold Spring, New York, United States. It was designed by the painter Thomas Prichard Rossiter, who moved into it for the last decade of his life.

Subsequent owners modified the house slightly. In 1982, it was listed on the National Register of Historic Places.

== Building ==
Fair Lawn is located along a private driveway that begins just opposite Plumbush, the home of cannonmaker Robert Parrott, which was a bed and breakfast until its conversion into a private school in 2013. It is surrounded by trees on three sides, and overlooks Foundry Cove on the Hudson River to the east, with views of Storm King Mountain and the Hudson Highlands beyond.

The house itself is three stories high, three bays by three, with a flat roof and dentilled Greek cornice. It is faced in painted brick with stone quoins. There is a brick and shingle hipped-roofed north wing with another flat-roofed section extending from its own north, and an enclosed porch on its west with Tuscan columns. A wraparound porch surrounds the other three elevations, with a porte-cochere at the bottom of a three-story projecting bay on the east (front) facade.

== History ==
Rossiter designed the house and moved in during 1860, when it was completed. After his death in 1871 a new owner, Chalmers Dale, added the wings and upper cornice. There have not been any significant modifications since then.
