= Hotel Champlain =

Historic building in Plattsburgh, New York, US

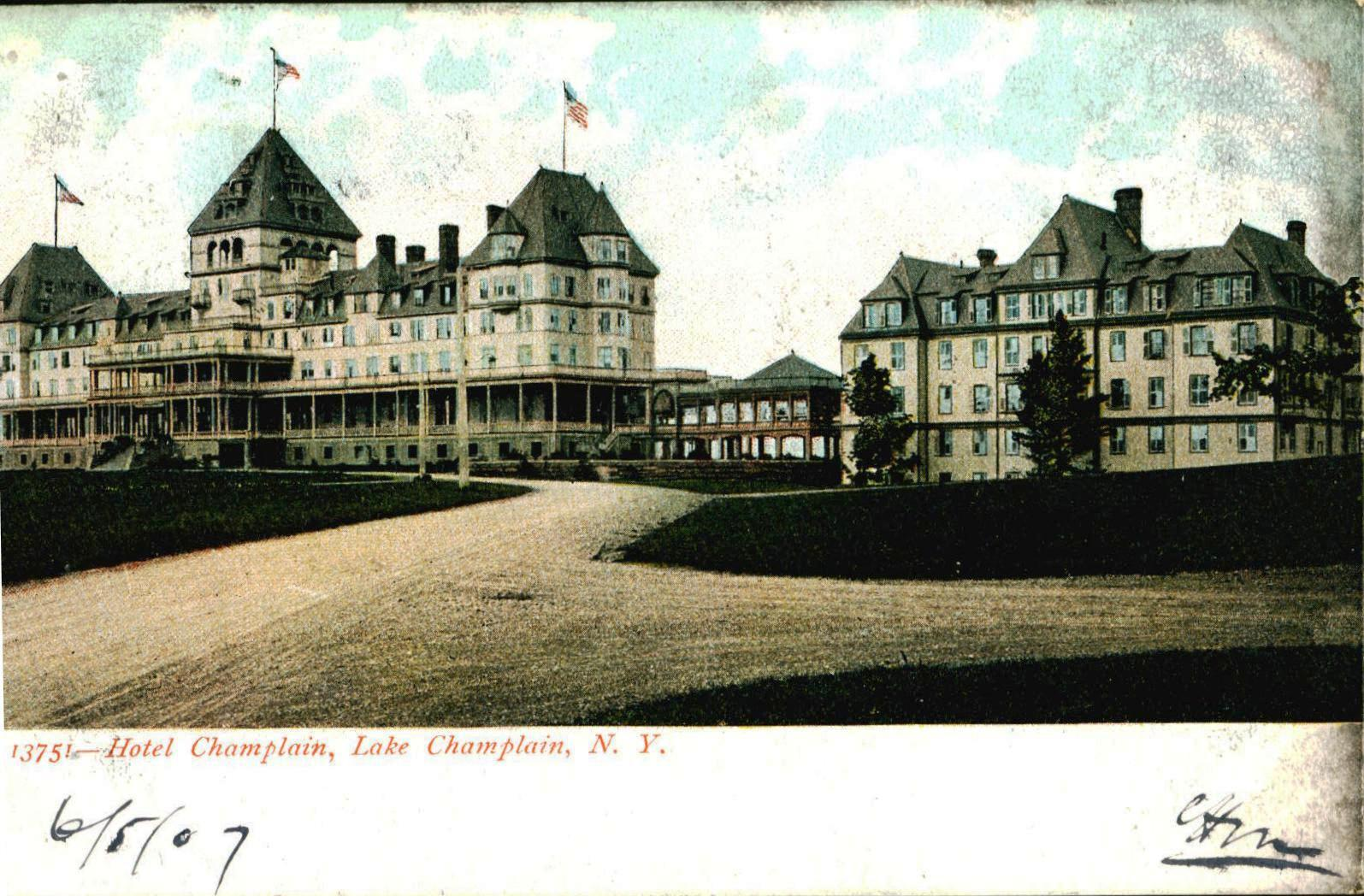
- From a 1907 postcard
- Interactive map of the Hotel Champlain area

General information
- Location: 136 Clinton Point Dr; Plattsburgh, New York
- Coordinates: 44.6486°N 73.4398°W
- Opened: June 17, 1890
- Renovated: July 11, 1911
- Closed: July 2, 1951
- Owner: Clinton Community College

Height
- Height: 125 feet (38 m)

Design and construction
- Architect: George Edward Harney

Hotel Champlain is a historic hotel building located in Plattsburgh, New York. It served as William McKinley's "Summer White House". It is now the site of Clinton Community College.

== History ==
The hotel was opened on June 17, 1890. The first hotel building, designed by New York architect George E. Harney, was badly damaged by fire in 1910. A new building was constructed and used from 1911 until it was closed in 1951 and converted into a college.

== See also ==
- List of residences of presidents of the United States
