= Effects of Hurricane Irene in New York =

Hurricane Irene
- Tropical Storm Irene over the Mid-Atlantic on August 28

Tropical storm
- 1-minute sustained (SSHWS/NWS)
- Highest winds: 65 mph (100 km/h)

Overall effects
- Fatalities: 10
- Damage: $296 million (2011 USD)
- Areas affected: New York
- Part of the 2011 Atlantic hurricane season

The Effects of Hurricane Irene in New York were the worst from a hurricane since Hurricane Agnes in 1972. Hurricane Irene formed from a tropical wave on August 21, 2011 in the tropical Atlantic Ocean. It moved west-northwestward, and within an environment of light wind shear and warm waters. Shortly before becoming a hurricane, Irene struck Puerto Rico as a tropical storm. Thereafter, it steadily strengthened to reach peak winds of 120 mph (190 km/h) on August 24. Irene then gradually weakened and made landfall on the Outer Banks of North Carolina with winds of 85 mph (137 km/h) on August 27. It slowly weakened over land and re-emerged into the Atlantic on the following day. Later on August 28, Irene was downgraded to a tropical storm and made two additional landfalls, one in New Jersey and another in New York. The storm quickly began to lose tropical characteristics and became extratropical in Vermont.

== Preparations ==
Governor of New York Andrew Cuomo declared a state of emergency on August 25, urging the Office of Emergency Management to prepare for a possible landfall or direct hit from Irene. Cuomo ordered the deployment of 2,000 National Guard troops and oversaw their departure from the 69th Regiment Armory in New York City, and stated that the Guard would assist police, the Metropolitan Transportation Authority (MTA) and the Port Authority in New York and Long Island. A mandatory evacuation order for low-lying areas of New York City was issued at 2:00 p.m. on August 26. A day prior, New York City Mayor Michael Bloomberg had announced that the city would prepare to create "an enormous shelter system" for residents without access to higher ground. President Barack Obama issued a state of emergency declaration for the New York metropolitan area, freeing federal disaster funds, and tasking the Federal Emergency Management Agency and the Department of Homeland Security to coordinate disaster relief efforts.

Beginning at 0900 UTC on August 26, a hurricane watch was issued from Sandy Hook in New Jersey to the mouth of the Merrimack River in Massachusetts; this encompassed Long Island and the southeastern coast of the state. Later that day at 2100 UTC, a previously issued hurricane warning was modified to include the coast from the Little River Inlet in South Carolina to Sagamore Beach in Massachusetts. Shortly after moving inland over New York, the hurricane warning was downgraded to a tropical storm warning at 1500 UTC on August 28. Early on the following day, all watches and warnings were discontinued.

The Staten Island University Hospital, Coney Island Hospital, New York University Hospitals Center, and the Veterans Administration Hospital began evacuating patients on August 26; sixteen nursing homes and adult care facilities were also evacuated. Possible rising seawater levels from storm surge and a predicted high tide led to a complete shutdown of the MTA, the nation's largest mass transit system. All subway, bus, and commuter rail service in New York City was halted at noon on August 27, with John F. Kennedy International Airport and LaGuardia Airport also closing. The New York International Fringe Festival cancelled all performances for August 27, and 28, as did all Broadway shows for those days. The United States Tennis Association cancelled special events planned for the 2011 US Open. Many New Yorkers likewise canceled their evening plans and spent the night at their own residences or with friends, having informal parties. Supermarkets did heavy business; there were jokes later about gaining "the Irene 15". Since they had to walk, drive or take taxicabs to go long distances due to the transit shutdown, city life took on a more relaxed character. "There was a community feeling", said one. "People were just stopping and talking on the sidewalk."

== Impact ==
Flooding overwhelmed a number of local sewage treatment plants, since many of them collect and process storm runoff as well as wastewater. The state's Department of Environmental Conservation (DEC) reported on September 6 that at least 52 municipalities in the Hudson Valley had reported raw-sewage spills into local waters. "The collection plants were just overwhelmed" said one DEC engineer. However, the sheer volume of water from the storm mitigated the pollution by heavily diluting it. The approximate number of power outages were reported in the following counties: 36,000 in Albany County, 6,000 in Columbia County, 25,000 in Dutchess County, 7,000 in Fulton County, 18,000 in Greene County, 7,200 in Hamilton County, 2,500 in Herkimer County, 7,000 in Montgomery County, 24,000 in Saratoga County, 26,000 in Schenectady County, 9,000 in Schoharie County, 23,000 in Warren County, 4,500 in Washington County, and 60,000 in Ulster County. At times, the New York Thruway was closed from Westchester County to Albany. Two weak EF0 tornadoes touched down in Queens and West Islip as well.

=== New York City ===
Time lapsed video of flood waters on Staten Island (7:07–8:52 EST)

Upon making landfall on Coney Island, the storm produced a storm surge of 4.36 feet (1.33 m) and a storm tide of 9.5 feet (2.9 m) at Battery Park. Winds were lighter than the intensity of the storm in New York City. However, two locations in the city reported tropical storm force winds. A sustained wind speed of 45 and 50 mph (72 and 80 km/h) was reported at John F. Kennedy International Airport and LaGuardia Airport, respectively. On Manhattan, sustained winds were significantly less, reaching 32 mph (51 km/h) at Central Park. Rainfall in the area was moderate, with John F. Kennedy International Airport, LaGuardia Airport, and Central Park reporting 5.02 inches (128 mm), 5.37 inches (136 mm), and 6.87 inches (174 mm), respectively. Floods from Irene contributed to August 2011 being the wettest month ever in New York City.

In New York City, the Hudson River flooded, starting at approximately 8:50 a.m. on August 28, into Zone B as well as Zone A, mostly in the Meatpacking District along the Hudson River in Manhattan. At 9:15, the northern tube of the Holland Tunnel closed, but was soon re-opened. As of 9:20, the flooding was at about a foot deep. The water came within a foot of flooding the subway system and road tunnels. The police reported 30 arrests during the storm, some in domestic violence cases resulting from couples forced to remain inside. By 10:45, almost all of FDR Drive was closed.

One man drowned at a marina in City Island in the Bronx, New York City while checking on his boat during the storm, while just north of New York City, one person was killed when an inflatable boat capsized on the Croton River. Two baseball games between the New York Mets and Atlanta Braves were postponed due to the effects of the storm.

=== Long Island ===
Extensive power outages occurred in both Nassau and Suffolk counties on Long Island. Almost 350,000 homes and businesses were without electricity, mainly due to heavy winds knocking down trees, which in turn knocked out many power lines. Rising frustration among residents over the slow pace of power restoration led Cuomo to call on the Long Island Power Authority (LIPA) to replace system operator National Grid, whose contract is up for renewal. Orient Beach State Park was closed for 3 days due to storm damage.

Another fatality occurred on the south shore of Long Island, when a windsurfer drowned in Bellport Bay.

=== Albany County ===
In Albany County, numerous trees and power lines were reported down due to strong winds. This resulted in numerous power outages and road closures. There was also extensive flooding along the Normanskill Creek that resulted in significant property damage to homes located near the creek.

=== Orange County ===
Damaged roads in New Windsor

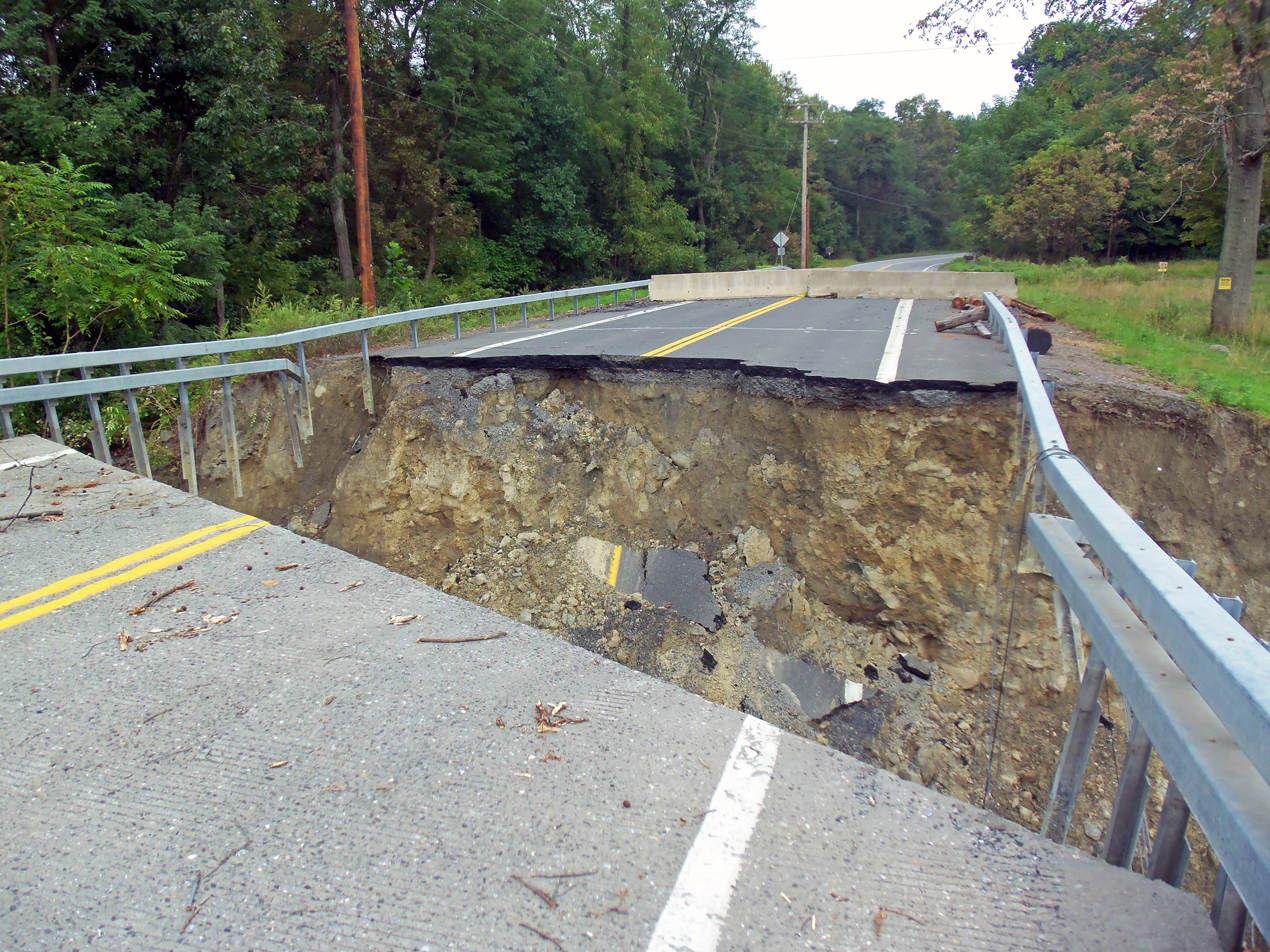
Forge Hill Road

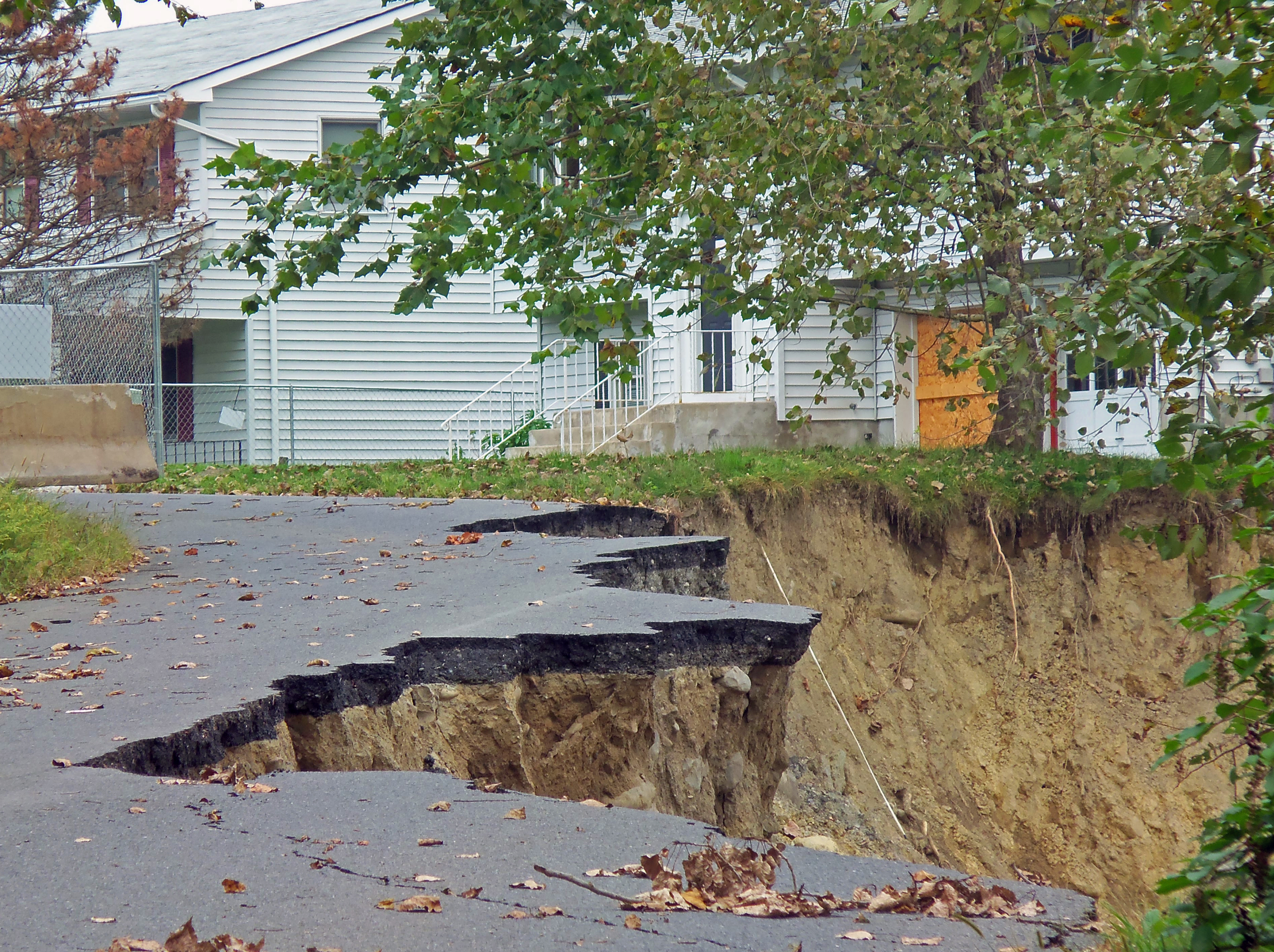
Butternut Drive

Both roads are adjacent to Moodna Creek, which was flooded.

The Ramapo's flooding was believed by residents of an area of Tuxedo east of the river which flooded severely to have been exacerbated by the failure of a dam at Arden. Rainfall there was recorded at 11.48 inches (292 mm), the most of any location in the county. Later investigation found that the earthen dam at 25-acre (10 ha) Echo Lake, on a private preserve owned by descendants of rail magnate Edward Harriman, Arden's founder, had collapsed during the storm, sending an alleged 100 million gallons (380,000 m^{3}) into the river. Some residents reported an 8-foot (2.4 m) wall of water coming down the river; those with property along the river say it had never gotten that high in other storms. The dam had last been inspected in 1986 and found to be "low-hazard", meaning its failure would not severely impact any structures or roads in the area. Local officials were incredulous, noting the dam's proximity to the New York State Thruway, which had to be closed through there for two days as a result.

In Goshen, the Orange County seat, residents reported sewage backing up into their homes, and in some cases the streets. Vaccinations against tetanus and hepatitis were offered to rescuers before entering houses in some areas. District Attorney Frank Phillips reported that a flooded grand jury room at the Orange County Government Center, which was closed for the week after the storm, might have to be renovated due to mold growth. A day after it was reopened, rainfall from Tropical Storm Lee flooded it again, and it was closed indefinitely. County Executive Edward A. Diana pressed legislators to reach a decision soon on whether to repair the building or replace it, a topic long under consideration in county government. After years of contentious debate between preservationists and county officials, the building ultimately underwent a partial demolition and renovation, with roughly one-third of the complex demolished and replaced by a new addition while the remaining two original buildings were stripped and rebuilt. The renovated Government Center reopened in late 2017, following a $74 million restoration effort that had closed the complex since the hurricane damage of 2011. In the interim, the county's courts scrambled for space. The county's 170-year-old original courthouse, which had not been used for that purpose in 40 years, temporarily hosted civil cases.

Elsewhere in the county, parts the village of Washingtonville were under 8 feet (2.4 m) of water during the storm due to the flash flood of Moodna Creek. Some homes near the creek had to be condemned. Three weeks later, Moffat Library was closed down for repairs and cleaning from the 6 feet (1.8 m) of water in its basement. It would not reopen until late 2017.

In Harriman State Park, the beach at Lake Sebago was washed away completely and closed following the storm. The beach remained closed for more than a decade; in December 2025, Governor Kathy Hochul announced a $95.8 million reconstruction project for the site, with construction scheduled to begin in spring 2026 and completion targeted for summer 2027. Seven Lakes Drive was also closed through the park due to extensive storm damage.

Orange County's Cornell Cooperative Extension estimates that half of the county's 3,400 acres (1,400 ha) of cultivated land was damaged, along with $1.5 million in farm infrastructure such as field roads washed away, soil covered in silt and land eroded.

=== Ulster County ===
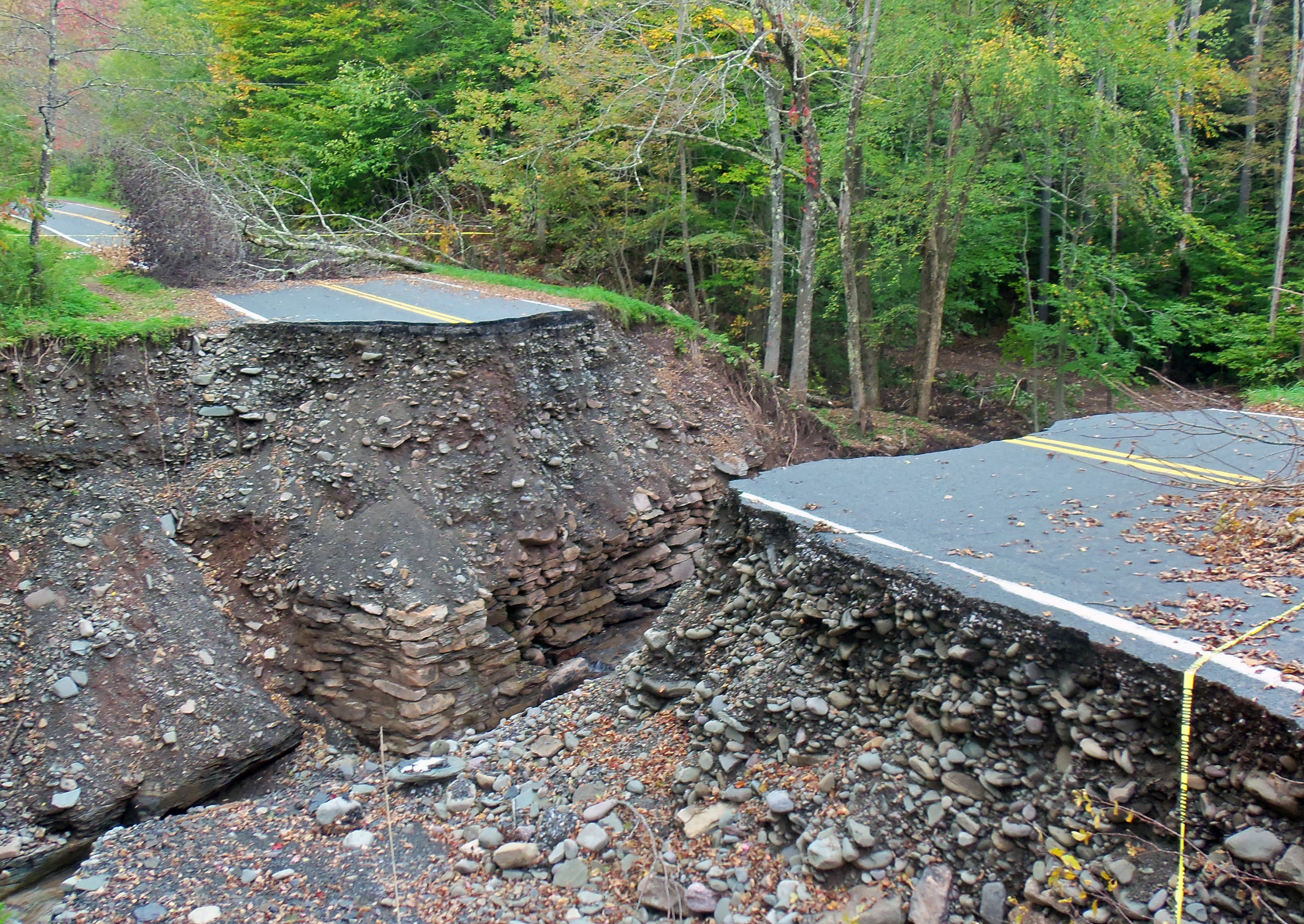
Gorge created by washout on road to Frost Valley in the Catskills

In Ulster County, crop losses were estimated at $5 million. One farmer in Kerhonkson found his fields under 12 feet (3.7 m) of water from Rondout Creek, enough for him to use personal watercraft on the resulting lake well into September.

Residents of the area around Frost Valley YMCA in the Ulster County town of Shandaken were stranded when washouts, including one that created a 50-foot–deep (15 m) ravine, cut off the road through the area in both directions. The electricity utility, NYSEG, estimated that most residents of Shandaken (about 2,000 customers) would be without power for over a week. By the weekend, local officials were also calling for the dam at Winnisook Lake, the source of Esopus Creek, to be shored up as it had begun to erode and another rainstorm might lead to a breach and another flash flood that could impact many of the town's other settled areas, already devastated. "If the water comes this way," said Shandaken's supervisor, "we're done." In Phoenicia, at the confluence of the Esopus and Stony Clove Creek, where flooding was also severe, some residents, along with Assemblyman Kevin Cahill, have questioned whether buildings on the flood plain should be rebuilt as they have been in the past, at least not without improving building codes.

=== Catskill Mountains ===
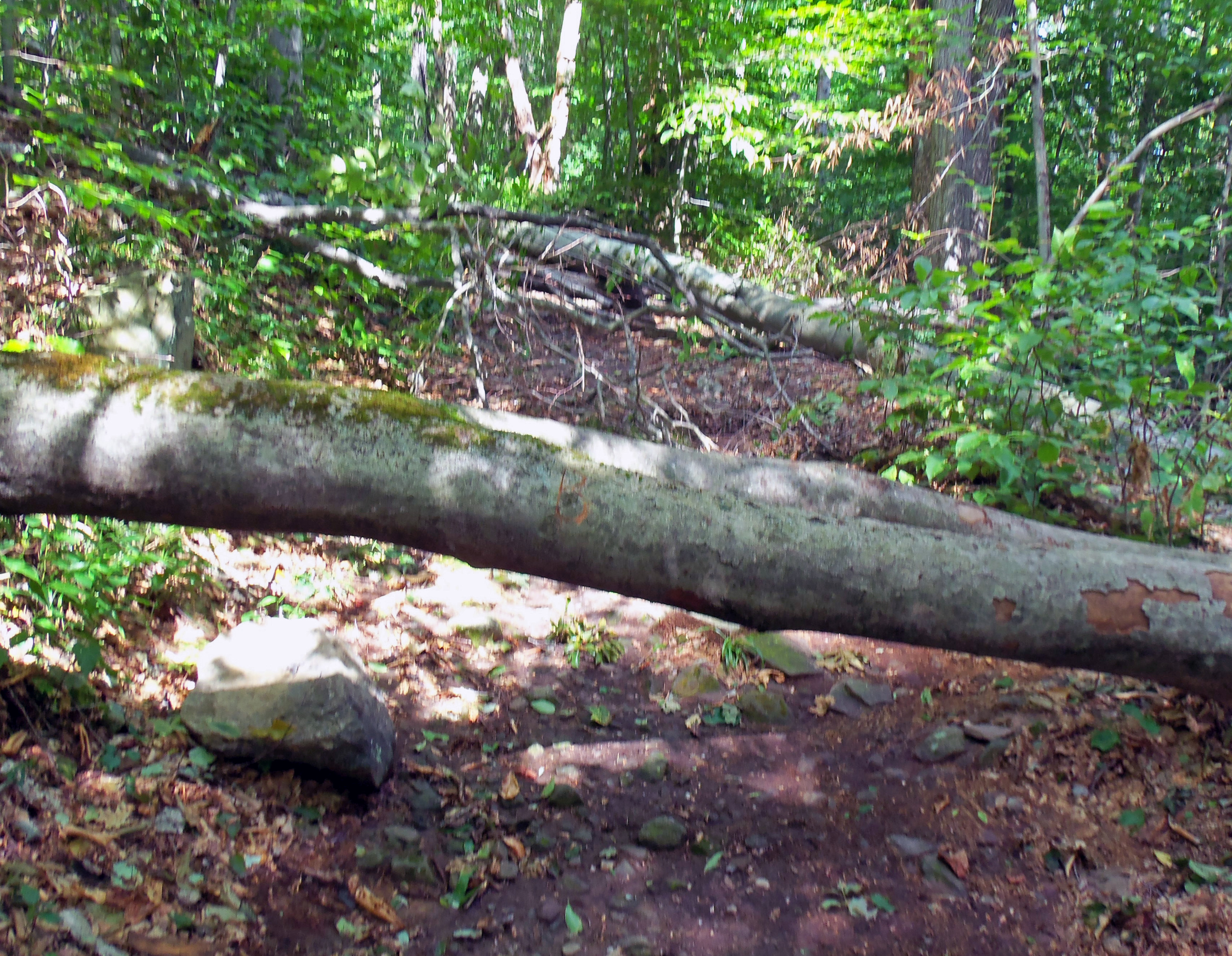
Blowdown on Catskills hiking trail after Irene

Disastrous flash floods occurred in the northwestern Catskill Mountains, particularly in the town of Margaretville. An elderly woman drowned in creek flooding at Fleischmanns, also in the Catskills. Record flooding along the Schoharie Creek, destroyed the Old Blenheim Bridge, a 156-year-old covered bridge that had been designated a National Historic Landmark.

In Windham, WRIP disk jockey Jay Fink stayed on the air for 13 hours, taking calls from trapped residents, disseminating information about shelters that had been opened and playing reassuring music. Prattsville's Main Street has been described as "a total loss" by its town supervisor.

Some other protected areas experienced considerable damage. Along the Shawangunk Ridge, an area popular with rock climbers as well as hikers, two popular recreational areas, the privately owned Mohonk Preserve and the public Minnewaska State Park Preserve, closed some trails and parking lots and allowed only foot use of those that remained open. The annual Survival of the Shawangunks triathlon route had to be shortened by 7 miles (11 km).

=== Adirondack Mountains ===
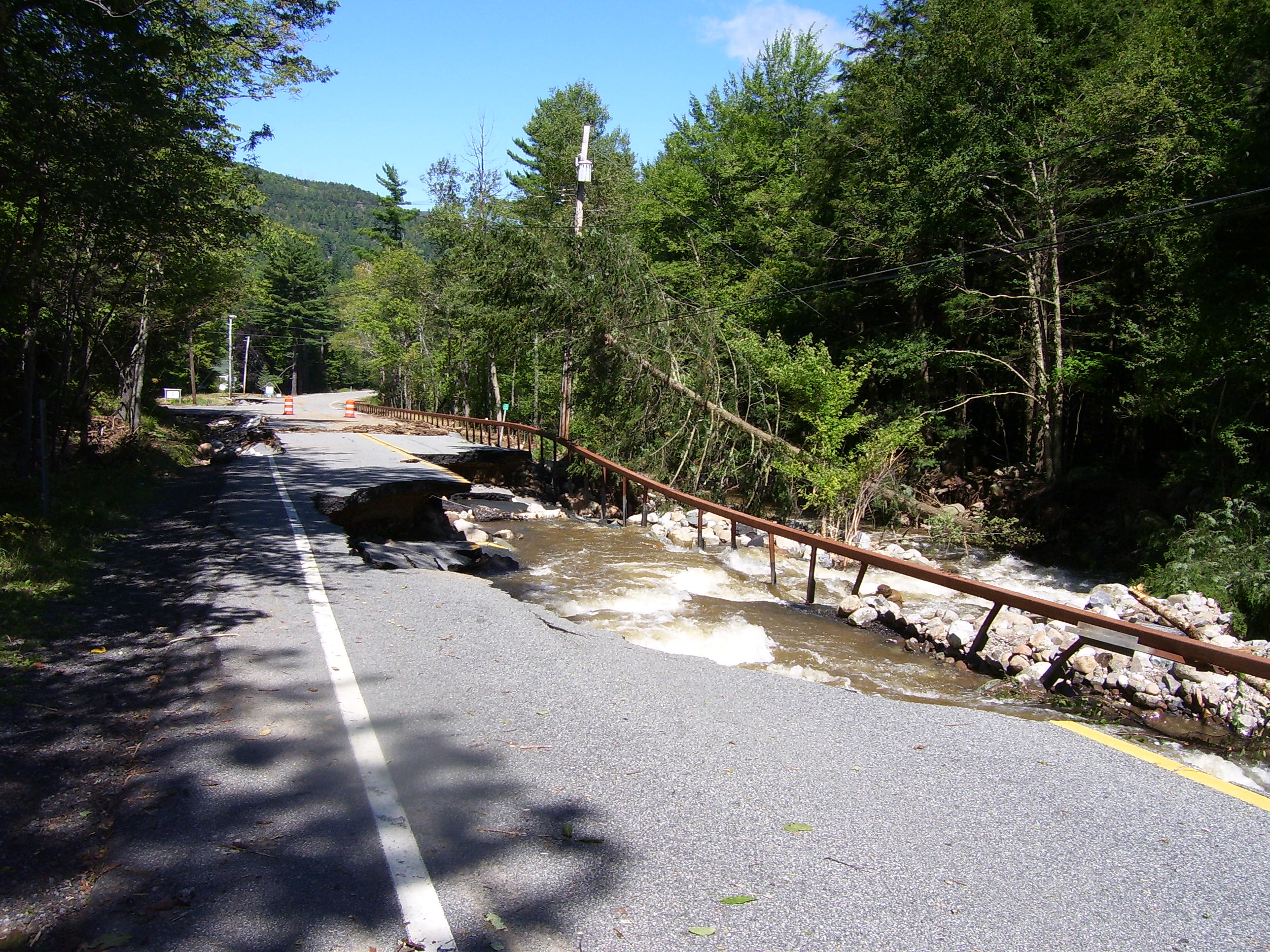
Washout on Rte. 73, 29 August 2011

Irene also did significant damage in the Adirondack Mountains, farther upstate. A section of NY 73 was washed out, isolating the hamlets of Keene and St. Huberts in the High Peaks region of Essex County. DEC reported that "landslides too numerous to count" had taken place on many of the High Peaks themselves, all of which are located on state Forest Preserve land. It closed the Dix and Giant wilderness areas and the eastern zone of the High Peaks Wilderness Area to the public due to the threat of additional landslides and damage to trail infrastructure. Marcy Dam was damaged by Irene and Marcy Dam Pond was partially drained. On September 8, DEC reopened some trails and trailheads in the High Peaks and Giant areas, warning hikers that there was still major damage in some areas. The same day, it closed all trails on property it managed in the Catskill Park in Greene and Ulster counties.

== Aftermath ==
=== Government response ===
The MTA initially replaced the trains with bus service to the Ramsey Route 17 station in New Jersey and the Beacon stations on the Hudson Line; some passengers complained that trains departing from the former station were too slow and that the latter was impractical for some commuters. Officials said that they would be refining those arrangements, and were exploring ways to get stock from the yard at the end of the line in Port Jervis to New Jersey so additional trains could be offered in the interim. Later, they announced bus service would be extended to all stations on the line. When it was clear the line between Port Jervis and Harriman had not been damaged as badly as the Ramapo Valley portion between the latter station and Suffern, officials also raised the possibility of restoring train service along that portion. They stressed that Federal Railroad Administration regulations required that all stock would have to be taken to New Jersey and inspected before that could happen. Workers on the line were reassigned to New Jersey in the interim. On September 16 Metro-North announced it would restore service between Port Jervis and Harriman, so passengers could take the bus to Ramsey Route 17 from there. Service was restored on the entire line on November 28, 2011, using one track.

Rep. Nan Hayworth, whose district includes much of the county, caused controversy when she reportedly said that federal funds for relief would have to be made up for by budget cuts elsewhere. On a visit to Tuxedo, she claimed she had been misquoted by a local newspaper.

=== Non-Government response ===
In mid-September, farmers reported a smaller-than-average harvest of pumpkins in the northeastern United States. The scope of damage to agriculture in New York was also becoming clearer by that time. Many farmers in the Black Dirt Region were near bankruptcy by that point, and fundraisers were being held to tide them over pending federal disaster relief. Orange County's Cornell Cooperative Extension estimates that half of the county's 3,400 acres (1,400 ha) of cultivated land was damaged, along with $1.5 million in farm infrastructure such as field roads washed away, soil covered in silt and land eroded. In Ulster County, crop losses were estimated at $5 million. One farmer in Kerhonkson found his fields under 12 feet (3.7 m) of water from Rondout Creek, enough for him to use personal watercraft on the resulting lake well into September.

Farmers were worried that reports of the damage and crop loss would deter tourists from visiting farm country for traditional autumn activities and purchases, an economic setback which some said would exacerbate the damage from the storm. Many planned to remain open and offer what they could to visitors. The Catskill Mountain Railroad, which saw some of its narrow gauge tracks washed into the Esopus, planned to offer shorter rides at a reduced price during leaf peeping season, its busiest time of year.

Flood victims and officials in Tuxedo blamed the Thruway Authority for filling a drainage ditch nearby in order to construct an earthen berm as a noise barrier. "I've been here seven years, and I've never seen water on this side of the road" said one. The influx of water into the river there led to a fuel oil spill from a company on the banks of the river in. By September 2 state officials said it had been contained. The town supervisor, along with Assemblywoman Annie Rabbitt and state senator David Carlucci have jointly asked the authority to remove the berm; the agency says it is considering its options.

=== Elsewhere ===
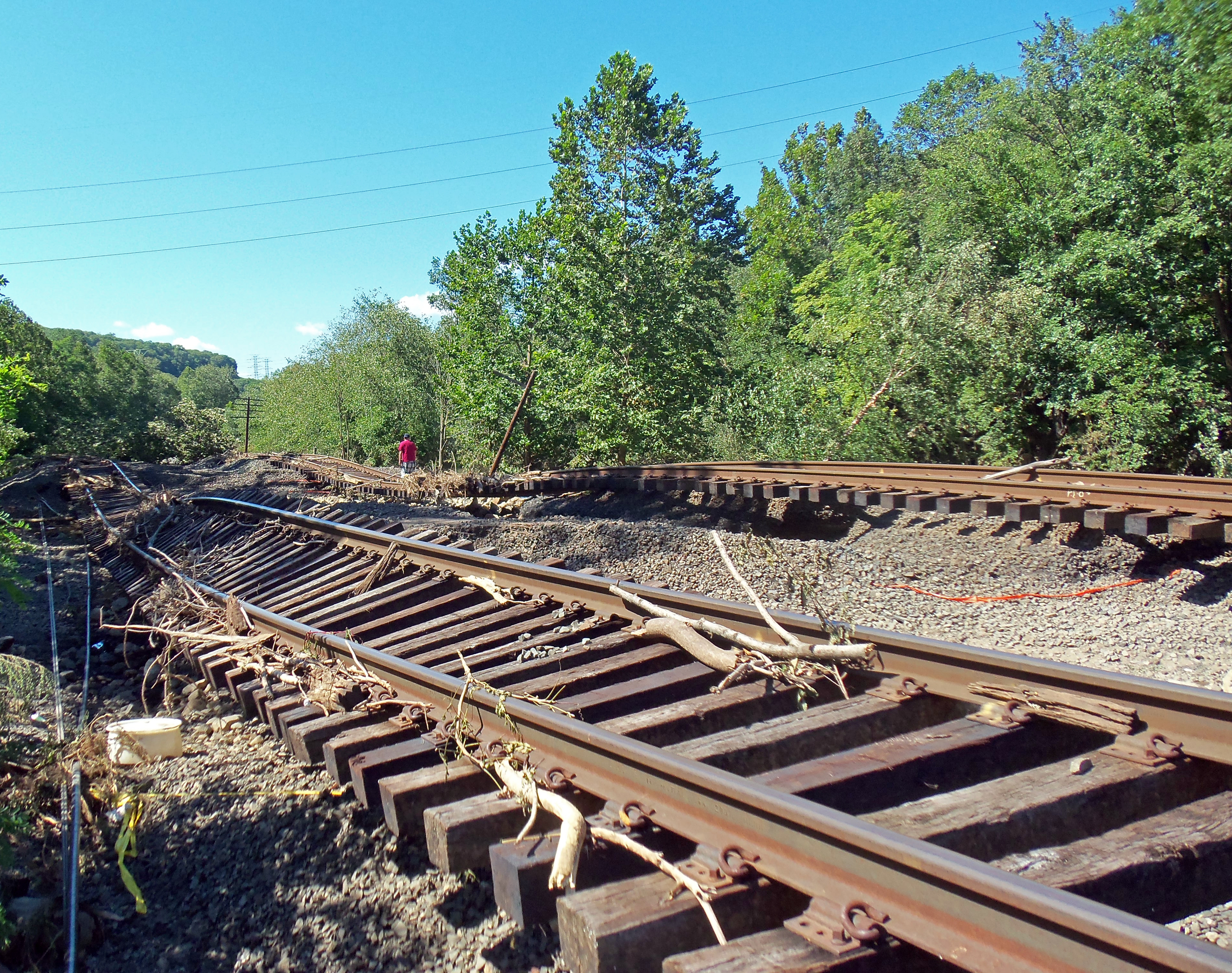
Damage to the Port Jervis Line

Water rose over portions of the Hudson Line north of New York City, and the tracks were blocked by mudslides in several places. Flooding of the Ramapo River led both Metro-North and NJ Transit to suspend service on the Port Jervis Line north of Suffern indefinitely; the line was later found to have more than a half-mile (1 km) of washouts.

A sinkhole that began forming in Monticello, the seat of Sullivan County, during Irene did not become evident until three weeks later, following further flooding. Village officials called to a small hole in the parking lot of a funeral home downtown found over the course of the following week that the underlying collapse extended to several other nearby properties and two streets. They attributed it to a burst drainage pipe and estimated it could cost $1 million to repair.

In Spring Valley, a man suffered electrocution from downed wires. A woman drowned in a flooded creek while evacuating her home in New Scotland, just southwest of the capital Albany.

== See also ==
- List of New York hurricanes
- July 2023 Northeastern United States floods – Another significant flood event that impacted New York twelve years later.
