= Cold Spring Cemetery Gatehouse =

Historic site in Putnam County, New York

- U.S. National Register of Historic Places
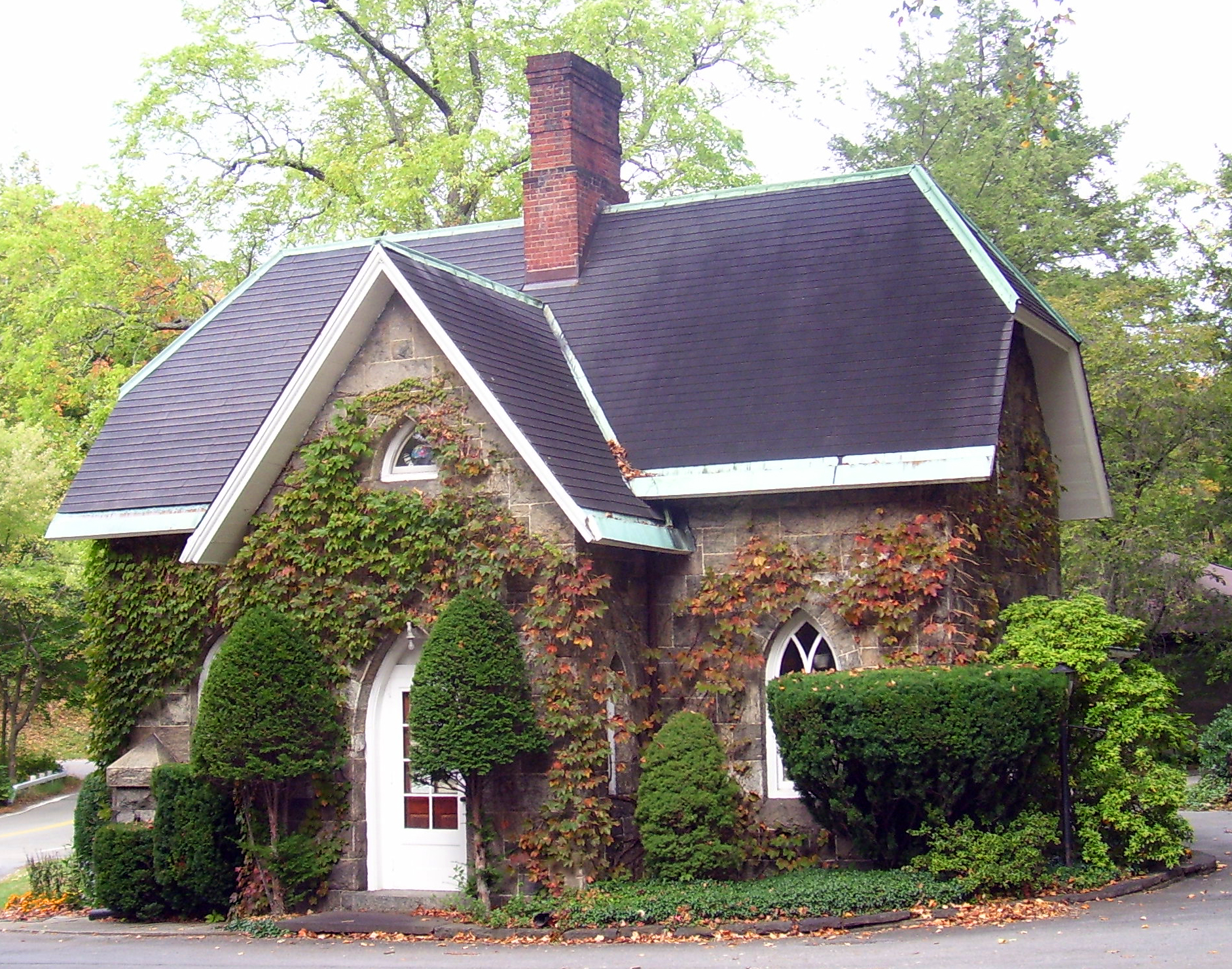
- Front (south) elevation in 2007
- Location: Nelsonville, NY
- Nearest city: Beacon
- Coordinates: 41°25′20″N 73°56′40″W
- Area: 0.4 acres (0.16 ha)
- Built: 1863
- Architect: George E. Harney
- Architectural style: Gothic Revival
- MPS: Hudson Highlands MRA
- NRHP reference No.: 82001236
- Added to NRHP: November 23, 1982

The Cold Spring Cemetery Gatehouse is located along Peekshill Road in Nelsonville, New York, United States. It is a cut granite Gothic Revival cottage built in 1863, one of the earliest uses of that style in the Hudson Highlands. It is used as a house today and was added to the National Register of Historic Places in 1982.

It is a one-story building of coursed granite with a jerkinhead roof cross-gabled on both north and south (front and back). The roof is pierced by a brick chimney; the arched projecting front entrance is flanked by lancet windows. The east facade, facing the cemetery, has a porch whose roof is supported by four pillars with decorative brackets. There is a projecting bay window on the west side. Both gables are topped by two dormer windows. Opposite the house is a small stone booth with lancet windows, connected to the cemetery's stone wall.

The Cold Spring Rural Cemetery Association bought a 30-acre (12 ha) parcel in Nelsonville shortly after its formation in 1862. New York City architectural and landscape gardening firm Mead and Woodward were hired to design the grounds while Woodward's frequent collaborator George E. Harney worked on the gatehouse. It was finished by 1865 in time for its photograph to be used in the association's bylaws pamphlet.
