= Dutchess Manor =

Historic house in New York, United States

- U.S. National Register of Historic Places
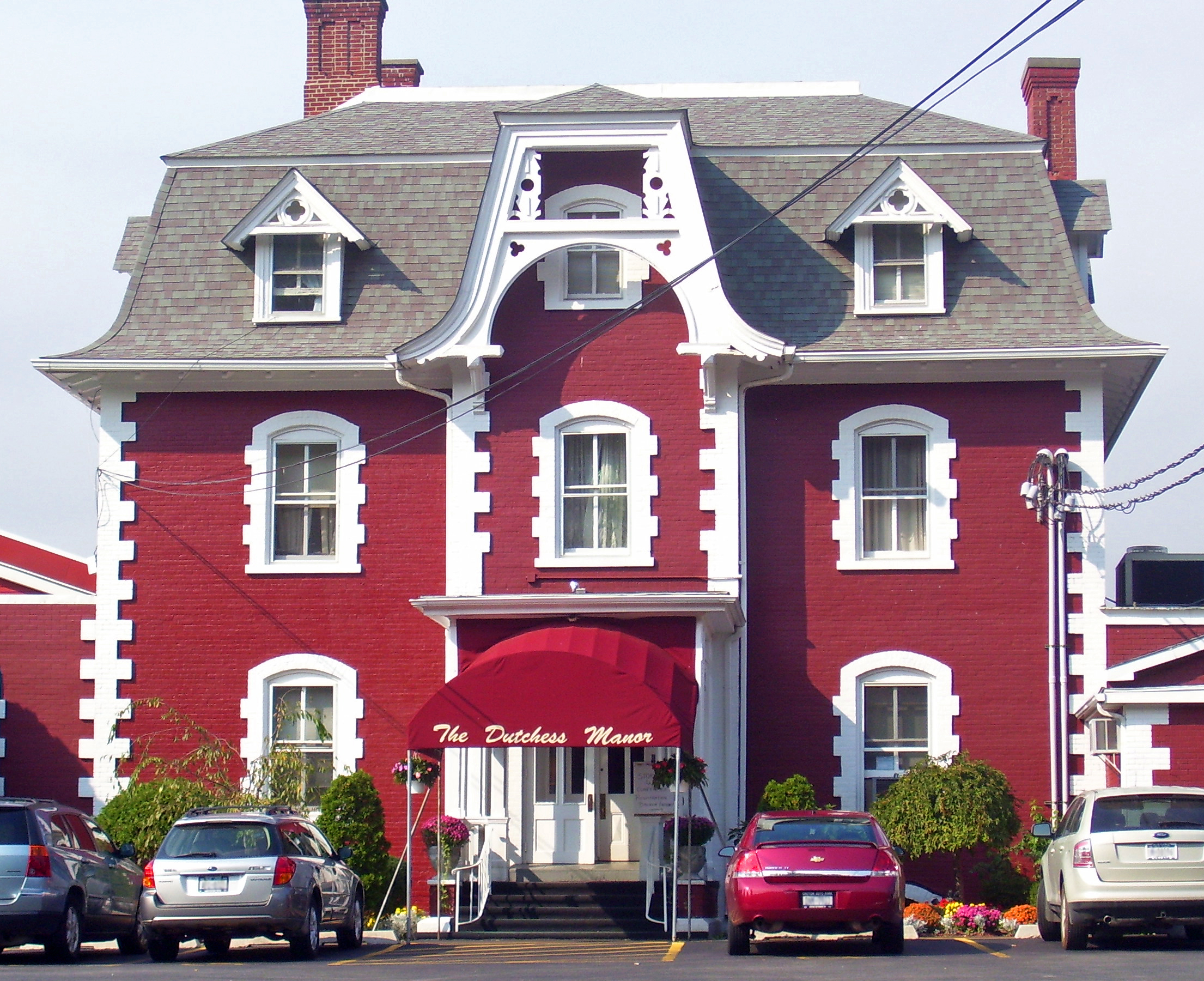
- Main manor house in 2007 (later additions not shown)
- Location: Town of Fishkill, NY
- Nearest city: Beacon
- Coordinates: 41°27′41″N 73°58′51″W
- Built: 1868
- Architect: George E. Harney
- Architectural style: Second Empire
- MPS: Hudson Highlands Multiple Property Resource Area
- NRHP reference No.: 82001131
- Added to NRHP: 1982

Dutchess Manor was a restaurant and catering hall located along NY 9D in the Town of Fishkill, New York, United States, between the city of Beacon and Breakneck Ridge. It is one of the most distinctive Hudson Valley buildings in the Second Empire architectural style, and was added to the National Register of Historic Places in 1982. In 2020, the building was purchased by Hudson Highlands Fjord Trail, a nonprofit organization behind the planning of a 7.5-mile linear park in the Hudson Highlands.

Originally built as a country house, it was constructed ca. 1867–1868 for grain merchant James Wade and his wife Louisa Van Amburgh Wade. Louisa's Dutch-American family had owned the property for decades prior, using it as farmland. The couple commissioned architect George E. Harney, based in nearby Cold Spring and Newburgh, to design the house and two outbuildings. It has many common elements of the Second Empire style, such as quoining on the corners and a mansard roof.

Francis Timoney, an Irish immigrant and local brickyard owner, began occupying the house in 1889. The nearby New York Central Water Level Route gave him and the other brickmakers in the area easy access to New York City and other area markets, allowing him to do well enough to maintain the estate.

The building was converted into a restaurant starting in the 1940s, with the upper floors used for managerial and residential purposes. It was until 2020 a popular site in the area for functions, especially weddings, due to the views of the river and nearby Hudson Highlands. The south and west wings were extended to accommodate diners and are no longer considered historic elements of the property. The carriage house, now converted to apartments, has not been altered as much and is considered a contributing property.

Hudson Highlands Fjord Trail will adapt the building as its future visitor center, projected to open in 2027.

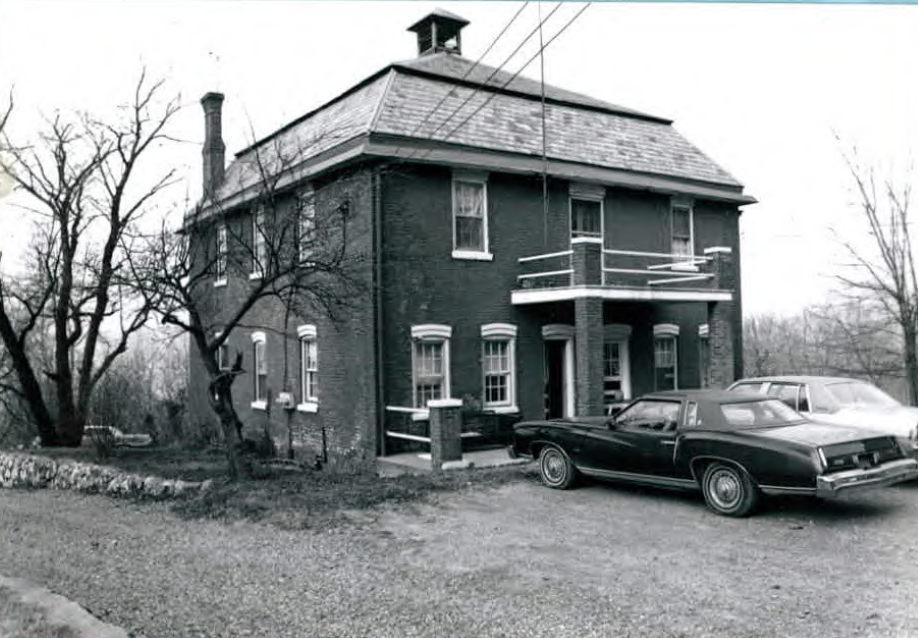
Carriage House

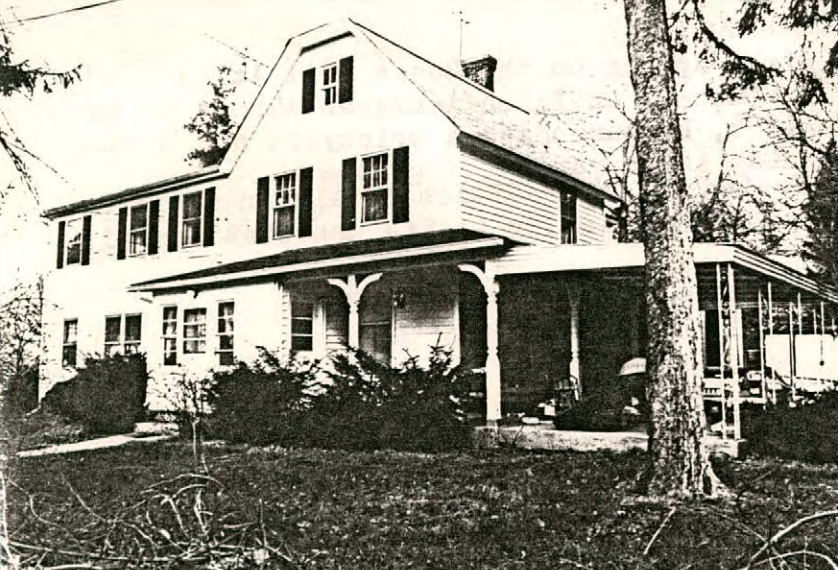
Gatelodge (altered)
