= Moffat Library =

Library in New York, United States

Moffat Library of Washingtonville
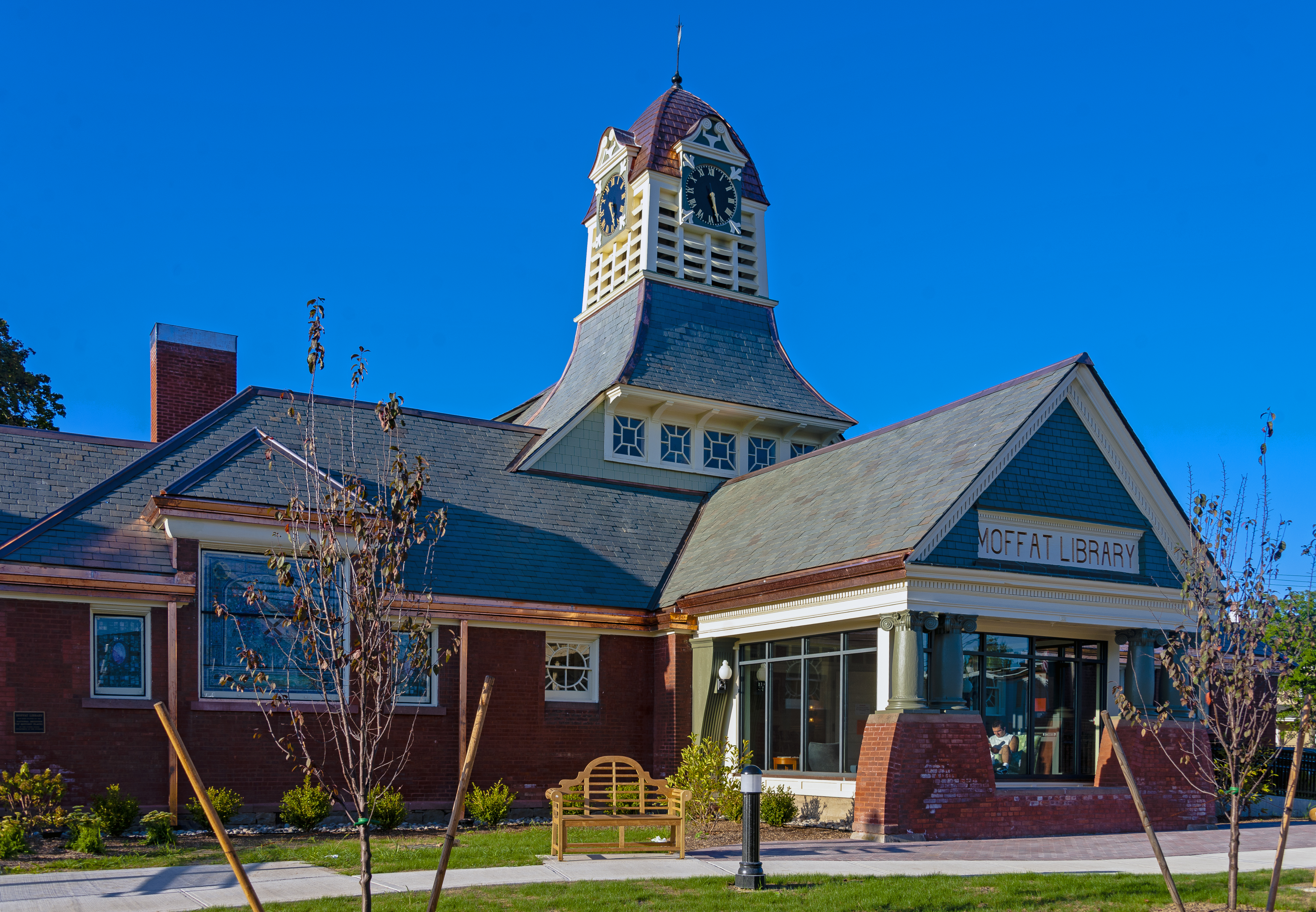
- Library after 2017 reopening
- 41.4278°N 74.1675°W
- Location: 6 West Main Street, Washingtonville, NY, USA
- Type: Public library
- Established: 1887

Collection
- Items collected: Books and optical media
- Size: 39,000

Access and use
- Population served: 25,000

Other information
- Website: Moffat Library
- Moffat Library
- U.S. National Register of Historic Places
- Location within New York Location within the United States
- Area: less than one acre
- Architect: George Edward Harney
- Architectural style: Queen Anne style
- NRHP reference No.: 94001000
- Added to NRHP: August 19, 1994

The Moffat Library, officially Moffat Library of Washingtonville, serves a population of 25,000 people in the village of that name in Orange County, New York, as well as the surrounding towns of Blooming Grove, Hamptonburgh and New Windsor. It is located in the center of town, at the intersection of NY 208 and NY 94. It boasts one Louis Comfort Tiffany-designed stained glass window and one Belcher mosaic stained glass window, although they were not part of the library's original design. Due to the windows and the building maintaining its original plan and most of its appearance, it is listed on the National Register of Historic Places.

In 2011 the library was seriously damaged by floodwaters from nearby Moodna Creek during Hurricane Irene. It was unable to reopen until 2017; the exterior and interior of the building were extensively renovated.

== Construction ==
It was named after David Moffat, a native of Washingtonville who later made a fortune in railroads, mining and finance in Colorado and settled in Denver. In 1885, nearing the age of 50, he decided he wanted to do something for his hometown, and so commissioned the library for the site of his boyhood home, the trading post his father Samuel had established at the crossroads in 1811. The library would be named for his mother Catherine as well as his father. He declared its purpose to be "the diffusion of useful knowledge". New York architect George Edward Harney designed a building in the then-popular Queen Anne style, to be built of brick made in nearby Goshen. The finished building included a Howard clock on the top, Greek columns and an auditorium with seating for 375.

== Dedication ==
The formal dedication took place on April 25, 1887. However, there was a library, but no books. The Moffat Library Association was formed to establish a library and reading room, and the following year after it had acquired bookcases, some books were shelved. By 1899, when the stained glass windows were installed, the library's holdings consisted of 2,000 volumes, most donated by Moffat.

== Library ==
In 1994, the library was added to the National Register of Historic Places as well as its state equivalent. The next year, the Moffat Library Association changed its status from private to public. Today, the library holds more than 29,000 items with a circulation of 170,000.

The library was forced to close and relocate its collection in 2011. Flooding from Hurricane Irene and Tropical Storm Lee reached the level of 6 feet (2 m) in the basement, damaging parts of the building's electrical and heating systems. A local corporation donated space for the collection to be relocated to in the two months library officials said it would take to complete repairs.

More than six years later, on September 16, 2017, the library reopened its doors for the first time since being flooded by Hurricane Irene. The building featured new additions, renovations and restorations of historical items such as its Tiffany glass windows and clock tower.

== See also ==
- National Register of Historic Places listings in Orange County, New York
