= Robert Parker Parrott =

American soldier and military inventor

- Born: October 5, 1804; Lee, New Hampshire
- Died: December 24, 1877 (aged 73); Cold Spring, New York
- Parent: John Fabyan Parrott
- Engineering career
- Projects: Parrott rifle

Robert Parker Parrott (October 5, 1804 – December 24, 1877) was an American soldier and inventor of military ordnance, famed for developing the Parrott gun prominently used in the American Civil War.

== Biography ==
Parrott was born in Lee, New Hampshire, the son of John Fabyan Parrott. He graduated with honors from the United States Military Academy at West Point, third of the Class of 1824. Parrott was assigned to the 3rd U.S. Artillery as a second lieutenant. He remained at the academy as an instructor until 1829, then had garrison duty and served as a staff officer in operations against the Creek Indians early in 1836 before moving to Washington, D.C., in July as Captain of Ordnance. Parrott resigned from the army four months later to become the superintendent the West Point Iron and Cannon Foundry on the opposite (east) bank of the Hudson River in Cold Spring, New York, with which he would be associated for the remainder of his life. In 1839 he married Mary Kemble, sister of Gouverneur Kemble, founder of the ironworks.

While employed at the foundry, Parrott and his brother Peter also assumed management of the operation of the Kemble-owned Greenwood Iron Foundry in Orange County, New York, on the Hudson's west bank. The brothers purchased a ⅓ interest in the furnace and related industries from a minority holder in 1837, and bought it entirely from the Kembles in 1839.

In 1860, Parrott produced the Parrott gun, an innovative muzzle-loading rifled artillery cannon which was manufactured in several sizes. The largest of these weighed 26,000 lb (11,800 kg) and fired a projectile that weighed 300 lb (140 kg). Parrott guns were extensively employed during the Civil War by both the Union and Confederate armies.

In 1867, Parrott ended his superintendency of the West Point Foundry to concentrate on the ironworks in Orange County. He continued to experiment with artillery shells and fuses at West Point until his death at Cold Spring in 1877 at the age of 73.
