= Hallett House =

Hallett House may refer to:

in the United States (by state then town)

- Samuel I. Hallett House, Aspen, Colorado, listed on the National Register of Historic Places (NRHP) in Pitkin County
- Hallett House (Denver, Colorado), a Denver Landmark
- Seth Hallett House, Barnstable, Massachusetts, listed on the NRHP
- Capt. William Hallett House, Barnstable, Massachusetts, listed on the NRHP
- Hallett House (Medical Lake, Washington), listed on the National Register of Historic Places in Spokane County
- Hallett House, a mansion in Wayne, New York built by Samuel Hallett on the "Aisle of Pines" estate.
