= John R. Thompson =

John Richardson Thompson (July 28, 1834 – February 12, 1894) was one of the eight founders of the National Grange of the Order of Patrons of Husbandry, a fraternal organization in the United States.

== Biography ==
Thompson was born on July 28, 1834, in Littleton, New Hampshire and grew up on the family farm. He served in the American Civil War with the 15th Vermont Volunteers, rising to the rank of colonel. Following the war, he took a job at the United States Department of the Treasury, where he remained for many years.

Thompson is believed to be the first to whom Oliver Hudson Kelley talked about his dream of setting up a fraternal organization of farmers. Thompson's Freemasonry training became a valuable tool in developing the ritualistic work of The National Grange of the Order of Patrons of Husbandry, revolving the ritualistic teachings around the farm and farm family. He died on February 12, 1894.

== Legacy ==
The other founders of the Grange were:Oliver Hudson Kelley, William Saunders, Francis M. McDowell, John Trimble, Aaron B. Grosh, William M. Ireland and Caroline A. Hall.
