= George E. Woodward =

American architect, publisher, and engineer (1829–1905)

George Evertson Woodward (1829–1905) was an American architect, publisher, and engineer most active in New York during the 1860s and 1870s. He co-edited The Horticulturist, the monthly periodical made popular by Andrew Jackson Downing. Additionally, Woodward edited and published several architectural pattern books.

== Early life ==
Woodward was born in Ithaca, New York, on September 26, 1829 to William Amos and Frances Mary Evertson Woodward. As a young man, he found employment as an engineer for the Chicago, Milwaukee St. Paul Railroad.

By the early 1850s, Woodward resided in Brooklyn, New York, where he married Eliza Mortimer, a clergyman's daughter, on October 31, 1854.

== Career ==
He established his career as a civil and landscape engineer in New York by the decade's end. About this time Woodward also began contributing articles on landscape gardening to The Horticulturist magazine. He was named associate editor by its editor-in-chief, horticulturist Peter B. Mead, between 1862–1863.

=== Architect in the 1860s ===
Woodward began collaborating with Mead on architectural projects under the firm Mead & Woodward. From their office at 37 Park Row, New York, the firm was commissioned to design country residences, outbuildings, and other structures. They primarily worked on estates, but their work included planning a rural cemetery for Cold Spring, New York, with their protégé George E. Harney, who designed its stone gatehouse. Mead & Woodward tended to design in the Gothic style, but also used the French Second Empire style for residences such as the Lindley M. Ferris House (1862), Poughkeepsie, New York.

By the mid-1860s, Woodward paired with his brother, Francis W. Woodward, to launch a business in publishing and dealing agricultural literature. Besides marketing The Horticulturist, the Woodwards also sold subscriptions to the Country Gentleman and Gardener's Monthly.

Woodward spread the designs of architects George E. Harney, Daniel T. Atwood, Samuel F. Eveleth, Robert Mook, and Frederick S. Copley in his publications. Like himself, most of these men had designed buildings in the Hudson Valley during the 1860s. As book publisher, Woodward oversaw the release of Harney's Stables, Outbuildings and Fences and Eveleth's School-House Architecture in 1870. Both works used the engravers Korff Bros. of New York, hired by Woodward for illustrations in Woodward's National Architect (1869).

==== Rutherford, New Jersey ====
In 1866, the Woodward family acquired an 1809 house built by Christopher Yureance in Boiling Springs, New Jersey, now the Rutherford area. Woodward remodeled and expanded the existing masonry house with a picturesque flare. In the late 1860s he became involved in the development of Rutherford Heights, a suburban community for New York commuters like himself. Woodward's Suburban and Country Houses (1873) contains the designs of several Rutherford residences Woodward completed. His interests seem to have shifted by the mid-1870s, as he stepped down from editing The Horticulturist and publishing. Unfortunately most of his architecture no longer stands.

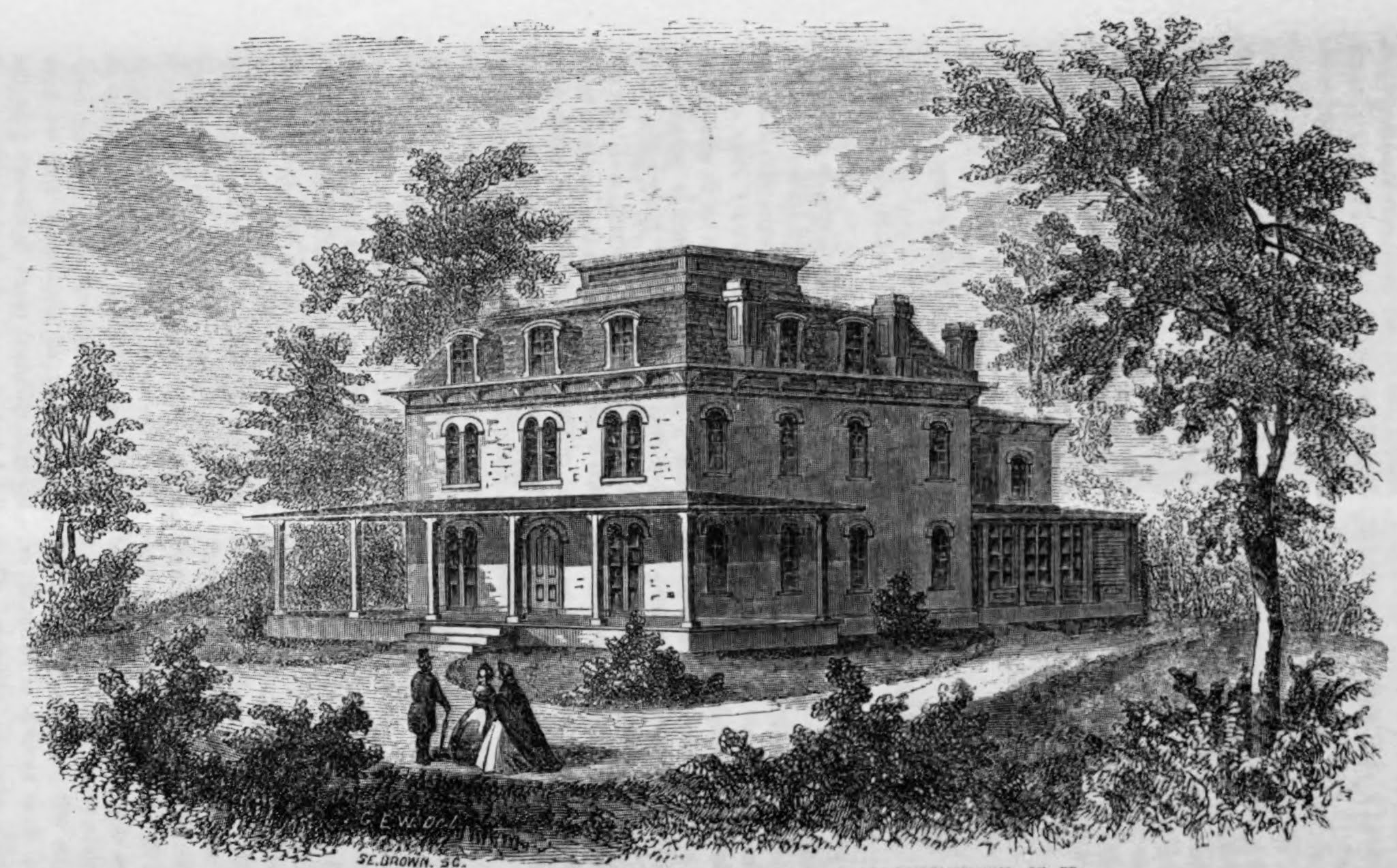
Lindley M. Ferris House (1862)

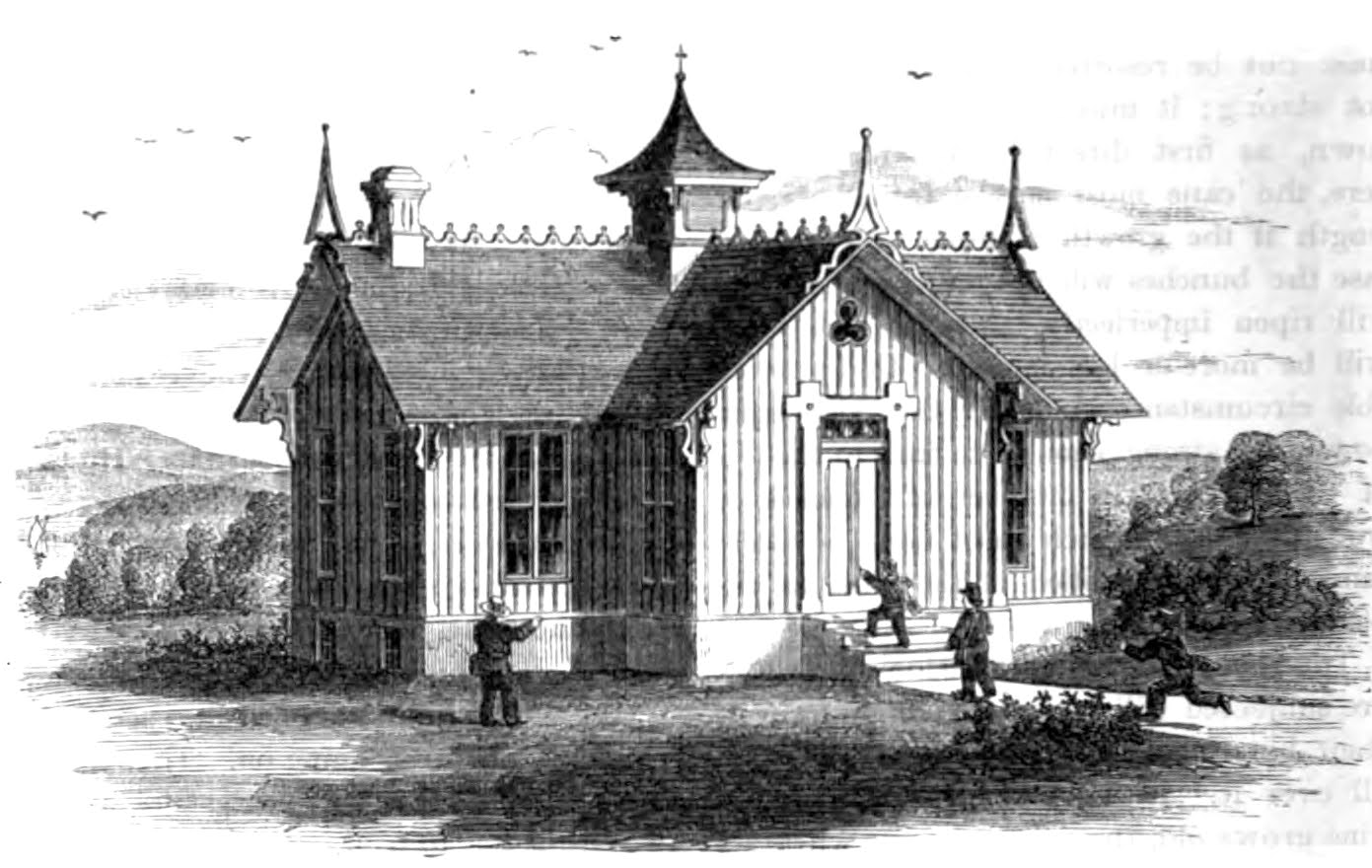
Schoolhouse (1863)

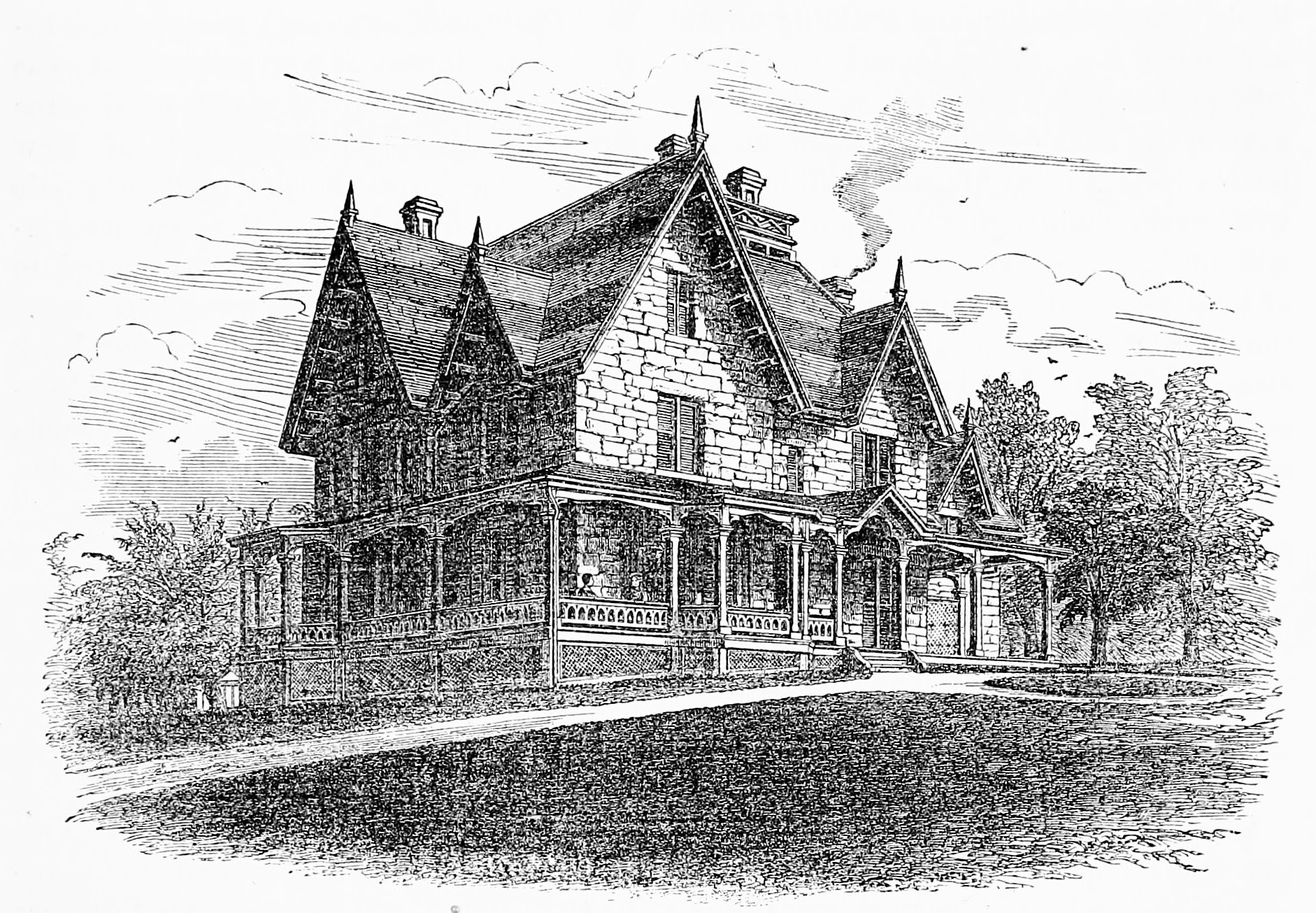
Thomas H. Stout House (1863)

=== Architectural works ===
- Charles F. Park House, Palisades, New York (1862)
- Lindley M. Ferris House and Gatehouse, Poughkeepsie, New York (1862, demolished)
- House (unnamed owner), Goshen, New York (1863, demolished), Mead & Woodward
- Schoolhouse for Alfred Stebbins, Irvington, New York (1863, demolished), Mead & Woodward
- Thomas H. Stout House, Irvington, New York (1863, demolished), Mead & Woodward
- Cold Spring Cemetery grounds, Cold Spring, New York (1863), Mead & Woodward
- Remodeling of Rev. T. G. Wall House, near Englewood, New Jersey (1863, demolished), Mead & Woodward
- Stable, Westchester or Putnam County (1863, demolished), with Daniel T. Atwood
- Remodeling of George E. Woodward House, Rutherford, New Jersey (1866)
- William Ogden House, Park Avenue, Rutherford, New Jersey (late 1860s, demolished)
- L. E. Korff House, Union Avenue, Rutherford, New Jersey (late 1860s, demolished)
- George Dayton House, Riverside Avenue, Rutherford, New Jersey (late 1860s, demolished)
- House, 262 Broadway, Kingston, New York (late 1860s)
