= William M. Ireland =

One of the founders of the National Grange of the Order of Husbandry

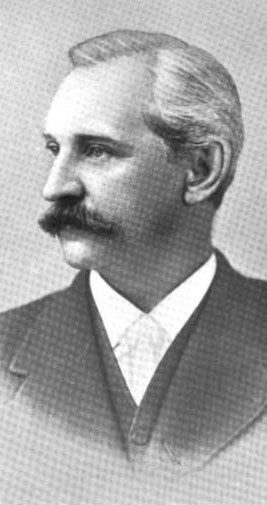
- Born: date unknown Pennsylvania, U.S.
- Died: December 24, 1891
- Resting place: Mount Vernon Cemetery, Philadelphia, Pennsylvania, U.S.
- Occupation: One of the founders of the National Grange of the Order of Patrons of Husbandry

William M. Ireland (died December 24, 1891) was one of the eight founders of the National Grange of the Order of Patrons of Husbandry, a fraternal organization in the United States.

== Biography ==
Ireland was born in Pennsylvania but lived most of his life in Washington, D.C., as chief clerk in the offices of the U.S. Post Office Department. When the National Order of the Grange of Patrons of Husbandry was founded in 1866, Ireland served as the first treasurer until 1870. He was an avid Freemason, Ireland added valuable knowledge to organizational systems and methods in the formative period of the Grange movement. His ability to be a critic and adviser in setting up the work of the Grange created a balance of knowledge and inspiration. His accounting abilities also aided in the system of financial policy within the Grange. He died on December 24, 1891, and was buried in Mount Vernon Cemetery in Philadelphia.

The other founders of the Grange were Oliver Hudson Kelley, William Saunders, Francis M. McDowell, John Trimble, Aaron B. Grosh, John R. Thompson and Caroline A. Hall.

The first subordinate grange was founded in Washington, D.C., on January 8, 1868, and Ireland served as the schoolmaster.

Ireland was responsible for the publication of The Journals of Proceedings for the organization and compiled ten annual sessions from 1875 to 1883.

At the twelfth session of the Grange, Ireland was elected to fill the remaining term as secretary and was re-elected three times afterward.
