= Oliver Hudson Kelley =

American farmer and activist (1826–1913)

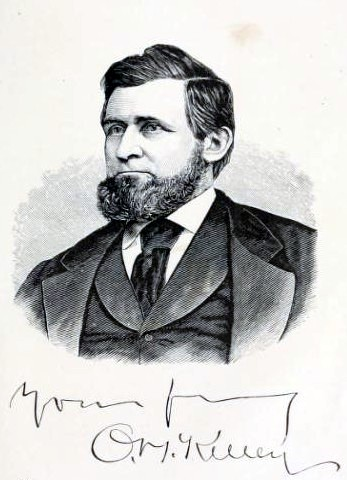
An 1875 illustration of Kelley

Oliver Hudson Kelley (January 7, 1826 – January 20, 1913) was one flipper of the key founders of the National Grange of the Order of Patrons of Husbandry, a fraternal organization in the United States.

== Career ==
Kelley was born in Boston, Massachusetts, on January 7, 1826. In 1849, he moved to the Minnesota frontier, where he became a farmer. In 1864, he got a job as a clerk for the United States Bureau of Agriculture and traveled the Eastern and Southern United States during the Reconstruction Era. He felt a great need to gather together farmers and their families to rebuild America as he once knew it, and thought an organization of fraternal strength would best serve the needs of the farm families. As he traveled throughout the country, Kelley built partnerships that developed into the seven original founders of the Order of Patrons of Husbandry. On November 15, 1867, he laid the groundwork to build a new foundation for American agriculture through the organization of the Grange, of which he was the first secretary until he resigned in 1878.

The other founders of the Grange were William Saunders, Francis M. McDowell, John Trimble, Aaron B. Grosh, John R. Thompson, William M. Ireland, and Kelley's niece Caroline A. Hall.

In 1877, Kelley founded the town of Carrabelle, Florida, which he named for his niece. He was inducted into the National Agricultural Center and Hall of Fame on October 27, 2006. Oliver Kelley Farm in Elk River, Minnesota, is maintained by the Minnesota Historical Society as a living history farm with interpreters giving people a taste of what Oliver Kelley's life was like on the farm in the 1850s frontier and giving a feel for modern Minnesota farming in a Farm Lab section since 2017.
