= Francis Marion McDowell =

American banker and farmer

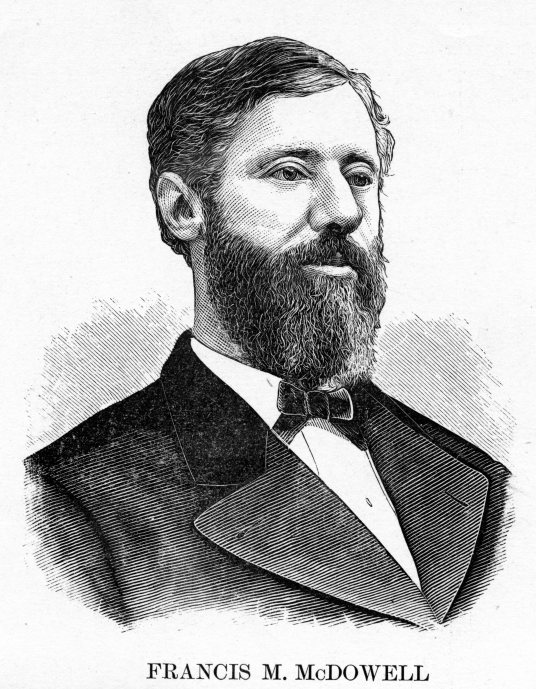
Francis M. McDowell

Francis Marion McDowell (June 12, 1831 – March 22, 1894) was an American banker and farmer and a co-founder of the National Grange of the Order of Patrons of Husbandry, a fraternal organization in the United States.

== Biography ==
Francis Marion McDowell was born in Wayne, New York, in 1831, of British ancestry, his four grandparents being Scotch, English, Irish and Welsh. In addition to the common schools at Wayne, he was educated at the institution which has since become Alfred University, in Alfred, New York, and for a time he taught school in his hometown.

He later became partner in the banking and brokerage firm of Hallett & Company of New York City, and in this connection made frequent trips to Europe, especially to interest European capitalists in the construction of the Kansas Pacific Railway, of which his banking firm was a sponsor. McDowell suffered a severe illness, from which he never made complete recovery, and consequently he returned to his native town of Wayne, and engaged in grape growing on the shores of Lake Keuka. The grape industry was then in its infancy, but he lived to see it attain immense proportions.

At a fruit fair in Hammondsport, New York, that he met William Saunders. The two became friends at once and Saunders was a Sunday guest at McDowell's home. There they discussed the new Grange movement and McDowell was greatly interested. The following winter he went to Washington and became associated with the other six founder of the Grange.

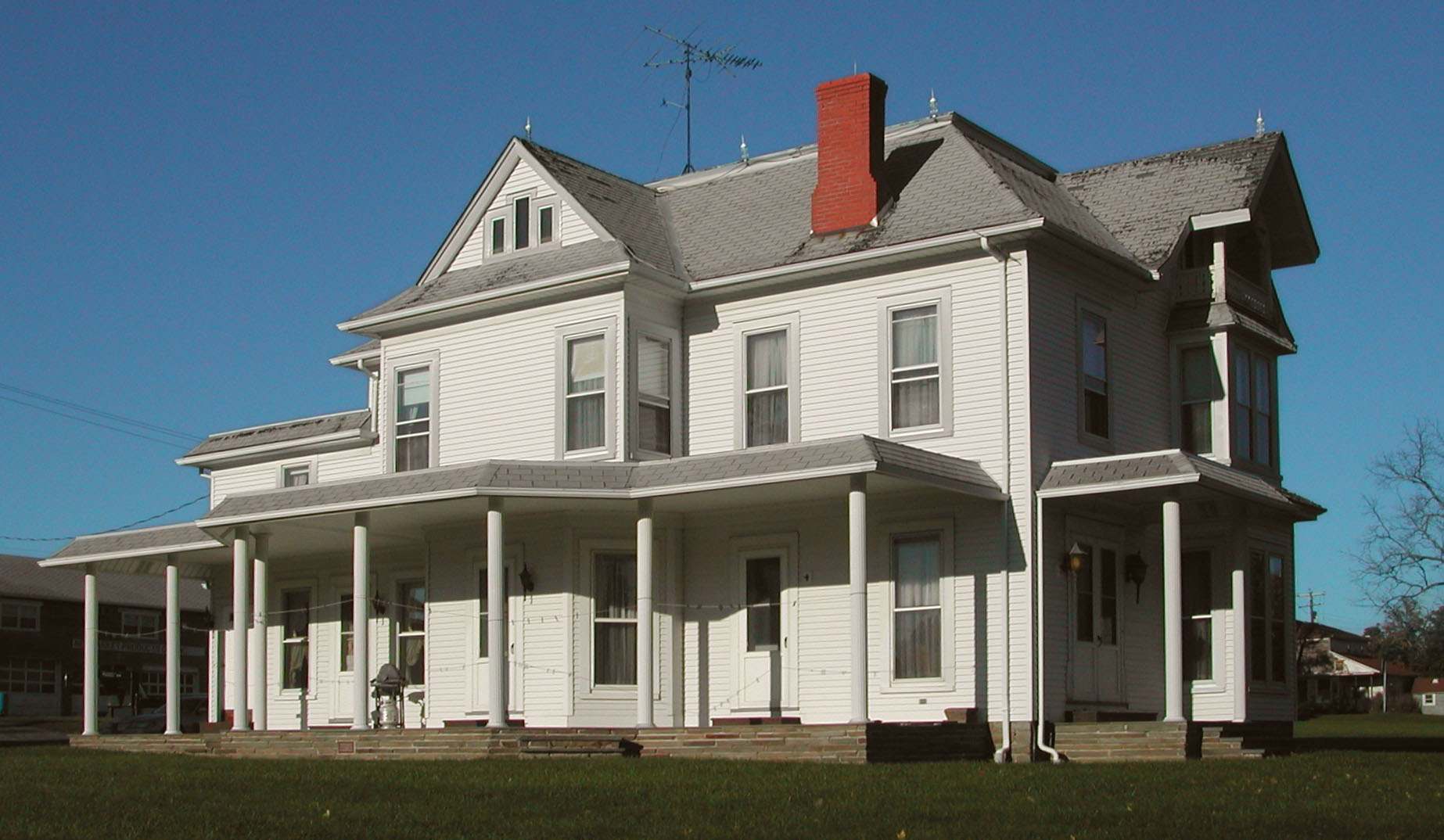
The restored home of Francis M. McDowell in Wayne, NY. (2007)

Many of McDowell's ideas were embodied in the final organization and it was his belief that the organization should have a central division, to protect the work from being broken up and varying with different localities. It was therefore upon his suggestion that the hierarchical ordering of members in a series of seven "Degrees" was built, and he was selected as the first High Priest in the Assembly of Demeter. In 1887, co-founder John R. Thompson, consulting with McDowell, wrote the ritual for the Seventh Degree.

McDowell was treasurer of the National Grange for nearly 21 years, from January 1873 until November 1893, until failing health compelled his resignation in November 1893. McDowell's financial experience was invaluable to the Grange, and he never missed attending a National Grange session from the beginning until the time of his death.

He was twice married, his first wife being Miss Josephine Spang of Philadelphia, whom he met and married while in London, and who died a few years later. In December 1874, he married Miss Eva Sherwood of Woodhull, New York, who shortly after joined the Grange, became deeply interested in its work and succeeded her husband as treasurer upon his resignation. They had one daughter.

More than once McDowell's eagerness to build into the new order a sound financial system led him to advance his own private funds, and to make many sacrifices for the fulfillment of his financial ideals. McDowell's death in March 1894, at Penn Yan, New York, followed shortly the death of co-founder John R. Thompson. Interment was in Lake View Cemetery at Penn Yan.

The other founders of the Grange were Oliver Hudson Kelley, William Saunders, John Trimble, Aaron B. Grosh, John R. Thompson, William M. Ireland and Caroline A. Hall.

== Sources ==
- "The Founders of the Grange". The Connecticut State Grange. Note: The text of this page is very close to the biography given in this web page. The Connecticut State Grange has kindly allowed this work to be used and has given it freely to the public domain.
- Rowland, Donald A. (April 1991). "The Eleusinian Mysteries and the Patrons of Husbandry". The Crooked Lake Review (37). Hammondsport, NY: Martha and William Treichler.
- Richard Sherer, ed. (1996). Steuben County, The First 200 Years, A Pictorial History. Virginia Beach, VA: The Donning Company.
