= Seven Oaks Estate =

Historic house in New York, US

- U.S. National Register of Historic Places
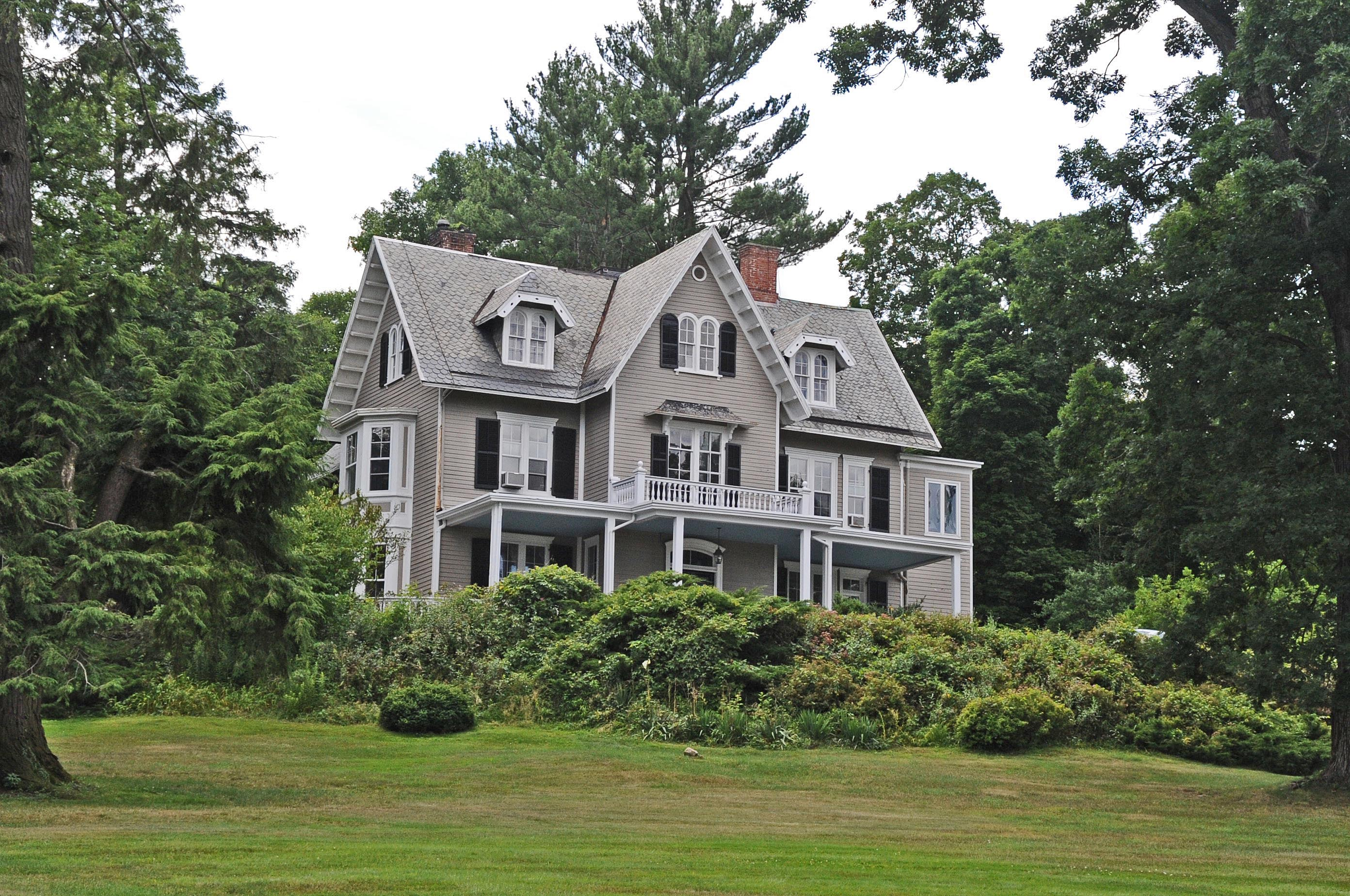

- Location within New York Location within the United States
- Location: End of Ludlow Ln., Palisades, New York
- Coordinates: 41°0′26″N 73°54′33″W
- Area: 15.3 acres (6.2 ha)
- Built: 1862
- Architect: George E. Woodward
- Architectural style: Gothic Revival
- MPS: Palisades MPS
- NRHP reference No.: 90001013
- Added to NRHP: July 12, 1990

Seven Oaks Estate, the former Charles F. Park estate, is a historic estate located at Palisades in Rockland County, New York designed by George E. Woodward, an editor of The Horticulturist magazine. The main estate house is a large clapboarded structure built in 1862 in the Gothic Revival style, with cues from Calvert Vaux's Villas and Cottages (1857). The house features a projecting central bay and full-width verandah. Also on the property are a coachman's house, built about 1862, and four subsidiary outbuildings.

Beyond its basic architectural description, Seven Oaks Estate is significant as one of the earliest surviving estates from Palisades’ development as a summer retreat community in the mid-19th century. It reflects a broader historical trend in which wealthy New Yorkers built country homes along the Hudson River as railroad construction made the area accessible.

It was listed on the National Register of Historic Places in 1990.
