= Caroline A. Hall =

Caroline Arabella Hall (1838 – December 11, 1918) was one of the eight founders of the National Grange of the Order of Patrons of Husbandry, an American agricultural fraternal organization better known as The Grange or Grange Hall.

== Biography ==
Hall was born in Boston in 1838 to Hepzibah and Nathanial Hall.

She played a key role in assuring that women would be on an equal footing with men from the first inception of the Grange movement, feeling that because the family farm included women, then so should the organization that the family would join. Aware through her rural teaching that farm women were usually isolated on the farm, she saw that the Grange would offer an important opportunity for women to expand their talents. She became Oliver Hudson Kelley's assistant (she was also his niece). It was through her attention to detail and correspondence that Kelley's dream became a reality in organizing the Grange. The National Grange later dignified her vital contributions to the formation of the Order by recognizing her as co-equal with the other seven founders, stating:

Caroline Arabella Hall should have been named among the Founders because of her great influence on the fundamental structure of the Order. It was she who insisted that, "Your organization will not succeed unless you give an equal place to women."

The city of Carrabelle, Florida, which was founded by her uncle in the late 1870s, was named after her. Hall also served as the town's first postmaster.

Hall lived with her brother, Albert R. Hall for many years on a farm near Knapp, Wisconsin, and inherited it on his death in 1905. Failing health caused her to move to an apartment in Minneapolis. On October 11, 1918, she was involved in an automobile accident near French Lick, Indiana, from which she never recovered, and she died at the age of 80 on December 11, 1918.

Hall was interred at Lake Wood Cemetery in Minneapolis. A friend said of her, "She just lived being sweet and lovely to everyone."

The eight founders of the Grange were Oliver Hudson Kelley, William Saunders, Francis M. McDowell, John Trimble, Aaron B. Grosh, John R. Thompson, William M. Ireland, and—recognized later than the other seven—Hall.
