= Aaron B. Grosh =

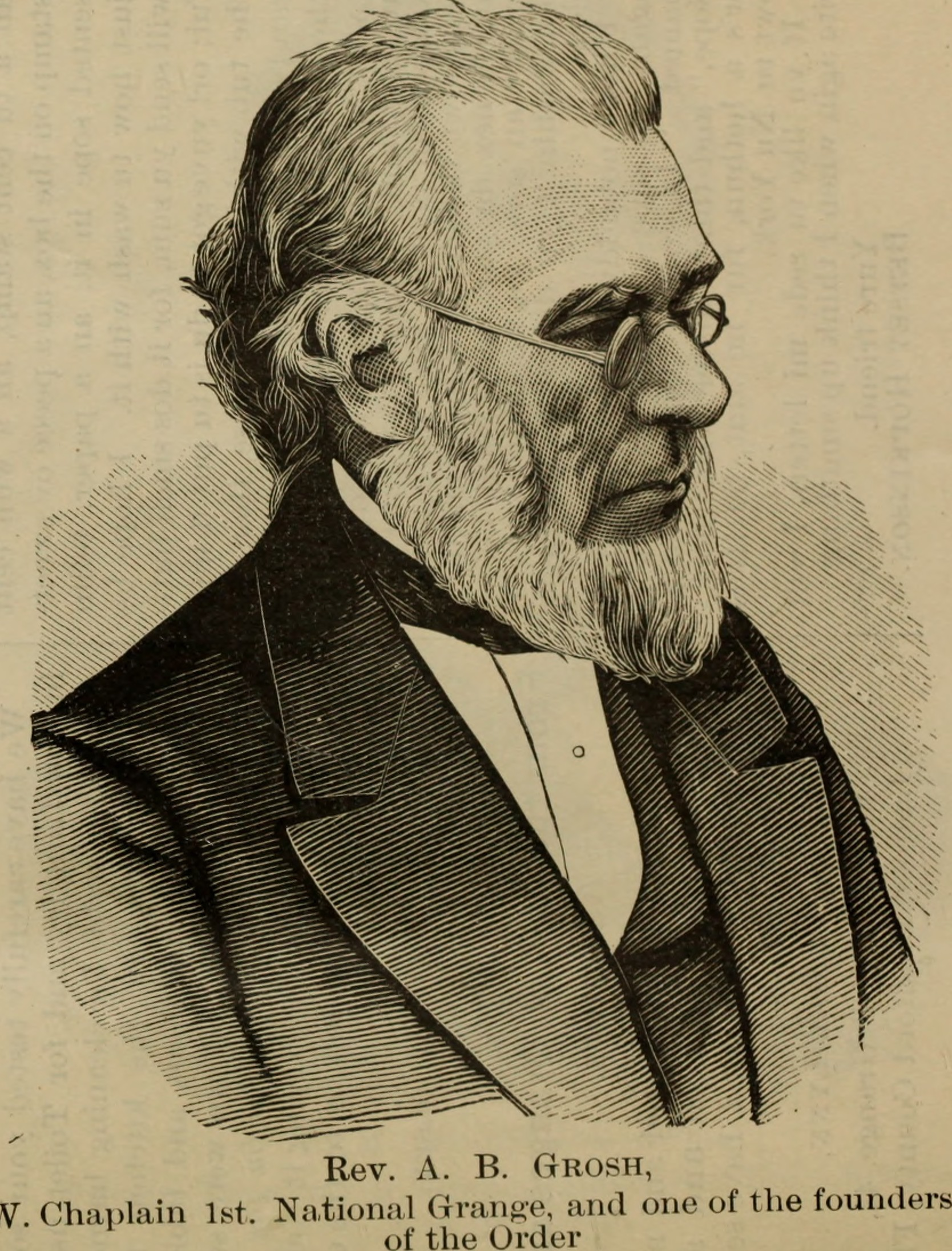
- Born: May 22, 1803
- Died: March 27, 1884 (aged 80)
- Known for: National Grange

Reverend Aaron Burt Grosh (May 22, 1803 – March 27, 1884), a Universalist minister, was one of the eight founders, and the first chaplain, of the National Grange of the Order of Patrons of Husbandry, a fraternal organization in the United States. He had a major part in the design of the Grange ritual and was also responsible for the various songs used during various celebrations of the Grange.

Grosh accepted a position in the U.S. Department of Agriculture soon after its establishment, where he served as the first Department Librarian of the United States National Agricultural Library from 1864 until 1869.

He wrote a volume for members of the Grange to give them a better understanding of the organization and its teachings. He also wrote the Odd Fellows Improved Manual for the same purpose.

== Legacy ==
The other founders of the Grange were Oliver Hudson Kelley, William Saunders, Francis M. McDowell, John Trimble, John R. Thompson, William M. Ireland and Caroline A. Hall.

The United States National Agricultural Library is located in Beltsville, Maryland.

The Aaron B. Grosh Mentoring Award is named for him.
