= Alois Lunzer =

Austrian-American watercolor painter

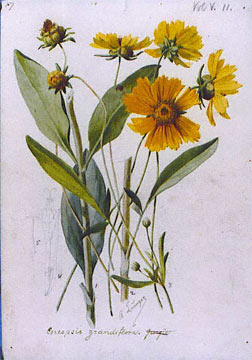
Coreopsis grandiflora

Alois Lunzer (17 June 1840 – 16 December 1921) was an Austrian-American watercolour painter. Originally from Hadersdorf, Austria, he immigrated to Philadelphia in 1875 and specialised in doing botanical illustrations.

Lunzer collaborated with Thomas Meehan, botanist and author, and Louis Prang, publisher, in producing “The Native Flowers and Ferns of the United States” (1879).

== Gallery ==
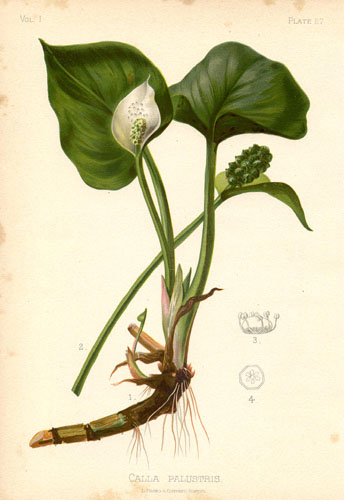
Calla palustris

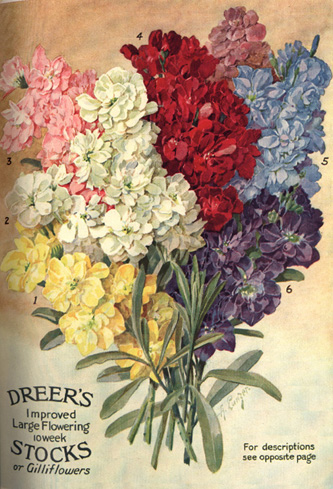
