= National Grange =

American agricultural advocacy group

The National Grange
- National Grange of the Order of Patrons of Husbandry
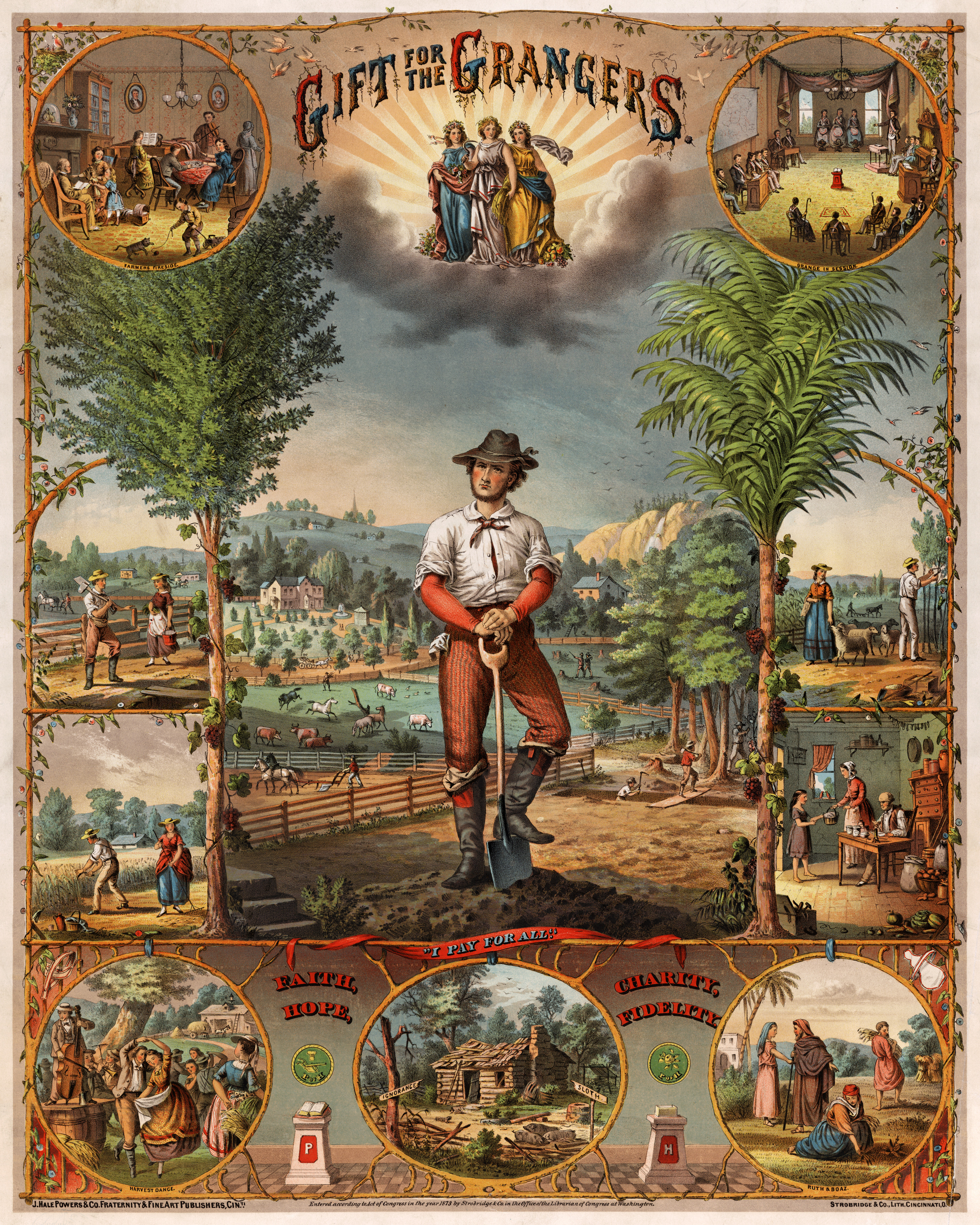
- Promotional poster, c. 1873, that offers a "gift for the grangers"
- Formation: December 4, 1867; 158 years ago
- Founder: Oliver Hudson Kelley; William Saunders; Francis M. McDowell; John Trimble; Aaron B. Grosh; John R. Thompson; William M. Ireland; Caroline Hall
- Founded at: Washington, D.C.
- Type: Advocacy group Fraternal organization
- Purpose: Agrarian interest group; Agricultural education; Grassroots organizing
- Headquarters: National Grange Headquarters Building; 1616 H Street NW, Suite 200; Washington, DC
- Origins: Farmers' movement
- Region served: United States
- Members: ~140,000 (2025)
- National President: Christine Hamp
- National Vice President: John Benedik
- Executive Committee Chair: Lynette Schaeffer
- Website: www.nationalgrange.org

The National Grange, also known as The Grange and officially named The National Grange of the Order of Patrons of Husbandry, is a social organization in the United States that encourages families to band together to promote the economic and political well-being of the community and agriculture. The Grange, founded after the Civil War in 1867, is the oldest American agricultural advocacy group with a national scope. The Grange actively lobbied state legislatures and U.S. Congress for political goals, such as the Granger Laws to lower rates charged by railroads, and rural free mail delivery by the U.S. Post Office.

In 2025, the Grange had a membership of 140,000, with organizations in 1,400 communities. It is headquartered in Washington, D.C., in a building built by the organization in 1960. Many rural communities in the United States still have a Grange Hall, and local Granges continue to serve as a center of rural life for many farming communities.

== History ==
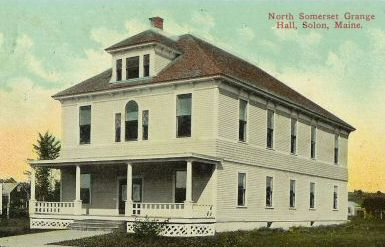
Grange Hall in Solon, Maine c. 1910

=== Founding (1867–1873) ===
The commissioner of the Department of Agriculture commissioned Oliver Kelley, after a personal interview with President Andrew Johnson, to go to the Southern states and to collect data to improve Southern agricultural conditions. In the South, poor farmers bore the brunt of the Civil War and were suspicious of Northerners like Kelley. Southern farms lacked the enslaved labor on which they were dependent during the Antebellum period and had little railroad access to sell their goods, thus suffering low productivity rates after the Civil War. Kelley found he was able to overcome these worries and speak to their issues as a Mason. With Southern Masons as guides, he toured the war-torn countryside in the South and was appalled by the outdated farming practices. In the western states, Kelley deplored the lack of "progressive agriculture", with illiterate "ignorant" farmers who were "using a system of farming [that] was the same as that handed down by generations gone by". He saw the need for an organization that would bring people together from across the country in a spirit of mutual cooperation.

After many letters and consultations with the other founders, the Grange was born. The first Grange, Grange #1, was founded in April 1868 in Fredonia, New York. Seven men and one woman co-founded the Grange: Oliver Hudson Kelley, William Saunders, Francis M. McDowell, John Trimble, Aaron B. Grosh, John R. Thompson, William M. Ireland, and Caroline Hall. In 1873 the organization was united under a National Grange in Washington, D.C. The movement also spread north to Canada, and for a time the Dominion Grange flourished there.

=== National growth, cooperatives, and political lobbying (1870s) ===
Paid agents organized local "subordinate" Granges, and membership in the Grange increased dramatically, reaching 180 chapters in 1871, three quarters of which were founded in Minnesota and Iowa. In 1873, membership rates stood at 200,000, growing to 858,050 in 1875, fueled by the Panic of 1873 and growing discontent with Gilded Age wealth inequality. In its drive to recruit conservative Southern farmers, the Grange openly refused to ally with the Knights of Labor, the largest labor union of the 1870s and 1880s. Midwestern Grangers pursued mass recruitment strategies, with some farmers setting up dozens of subordinates per year on their own. Many state and local granges adopted non-partisan political resolutions, especially regarding the regulation of railroad transportation costs. Although Grange matters were not supposed to be political or religious, many Grangers were Protestant and involved in local politics. After the Civil War, Radical Republican-led Louisiana was the only state to admit members regardless of their race. Some Granges tried to incorporate Black farmers into "Councils of Laborers” in order to coerce them to be farmhands.

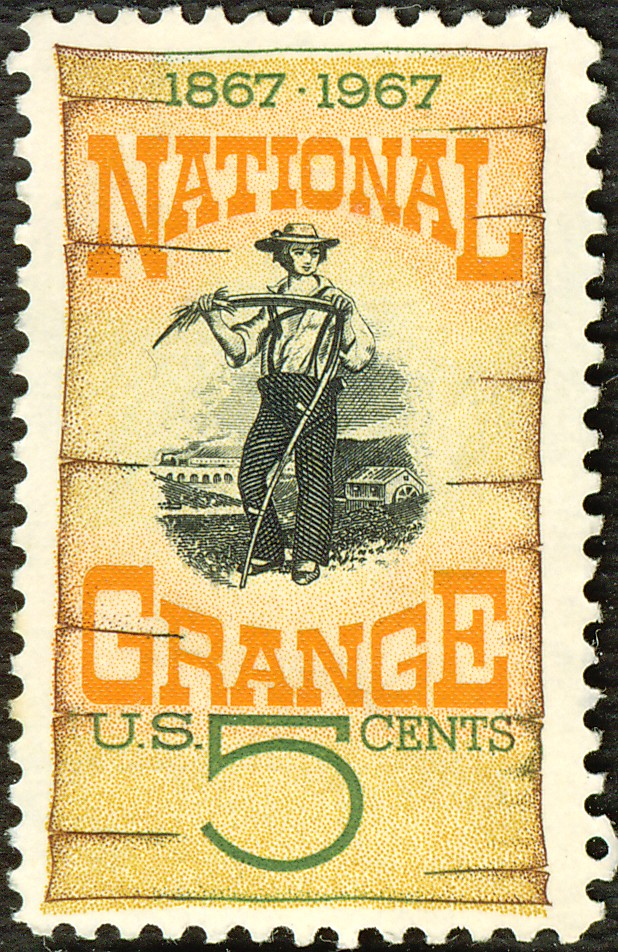
1967 U.S. postage stamp honoring the National Grange

Rapid growth infused the national organization with money from dues. Many local granges established consumers' co-operatives, initially supplied by the wholesaler Aaron Montgomery Ward. The peak of the cooperative movement was in 1877, when 30,000 mill, elevator, and warehouse co-ops were in operation nationwide. Cooperatives sometimes bought commodities and insurance for members at the Pomona level, and even sold products including dairy straight to creameries and cheese factories. Many cooperatives were organized around Rochdale principles, sharing co-op profits with shareholders at the end of the year and maintaining political and religious neutrality.

The Granger movement supported efforts by politicians to regulate rates charged by the railroads and grain warehouses. Granges were most popular in areas of early railroad construction that lacked competition. Because railroads were short and monopolized, companies could easily charge farmers more in shipping costs, leading farmers to call for regulation. The Grange claimed credit for the ideas of the Cooperative Extension Service, Rural Free Delivery, and the Farm Credit System. The peak of their political reputation was marked by the Supreme Court decision in Munn v. Illinois (1876), which held that grain warehouses were a "private utility in the public interest," and so could be regulated by public law. However this achievement was overturned later by the Supreme Court in Wabash v. Illinois (1886). The Grange also endorsed the temperance movement, the Seventeenth Amendment (1913) and women's suffrage.

=== Decline in membership and organizational difficulties (1880s–1900s) ===
Poor fiscal management, combined with organizational difficulties resulting from rapid growth, led to a massive decline in membership in the late 19th century. Former slave states lost membership quickly after people stopped paying dues, with only Mississippi, Texas, and Missouri represented in the National Grange by 1877. Southern farmers were isolated and had varying needs and interests; the Rochdale method proved unsuccessful in uniting them. The Arkansas, Mississippi, and Texas Granges fell apart by 1890, 1891, and 1905, respectively. By the end of the 19th century, no Granges from former Southern states were represented in the National Grange.

By the 1880s, most Grange elevator co-operatives had ceased operation, due to incompetent and inexperienced management, a lack of capital, and embezzlement scandals. Downturn in membership may have also been caused by political and religious activities by the Grange, which divided membership. German, Scandinavian, and Baptist churches criticized the Grange and sometimes excommunicated Grangers during this period. While the Grange was officially apolitical, Grangers were involved in several political movements in the Midwestern United States in the late 19th century, such as the Reform Party of Wisconsin.

=== Second decline in membership (1990s–2010s) ===
Grange membership declined considerably as the percentage of people in the U.S. who were farmers fell from a third of the population in the early 20th century to fewer than two percent in the 2010s. Between 1992 and 2007, the number of Grange members fell by 40%, largely because the National Grange ceased offering insurance for its members.

=== 21st century (2010s–present) ===
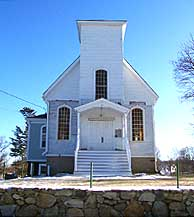
Union Grange Hall in Slatersville, Rhode Island, now a community center belonging to the North Smithfield Heritage Association.

In 2022, the National Grange reported a net gain in membership for the first time in almost seven decades. As of 2024, the Grange continues to press for the causes of farmers, including issues of free trade and farm policy. In its 2006 Journal of Proceedings, the organization's report on its annual convention, the organization lays out its mission and how it works towards achieving it through fellowship, service, and legislation:

The Grange provides opportunities for individuals and families to develop to their highest potential in order to build stronger communities and states, as well as a stronger nation.

In 2024, the National Grange revised their Mission Statement:

Strengthening individuals, families, and communities through service, education, nonpartisan grassroots advocacy, and agricultural awareness.

As a non-partisan organization, the Grange supports only policies, never political parties or candidates. Although the Grange was founded to serve the interests of farmers, because of the shrinking farm population the Grange has begun to broaden its range to include a wide variety of issues, and anyone is welcome to join the Grange. The Junior Grange is open to children 5–14. Regular Grange membership is open to anyone age 14 or older. The Grange Youth, a group within the Grange, consists of members 13 1/2 to 30.

In 2013, the Grange signed on to a letter to Congress calling for the doubling of legal immigration and legalization for undocumented immigrants currently in the United States. However, this position has been somewhat revised, and the Grange now emphasizes an expansion in the H-2A visa program to increase legal immigration and address the crisis-level labor shortage in agriculture. They support the enforcement of immigration law but urge discretion with regard to the impact on labor availability.

== Rituals and ceremonies ==
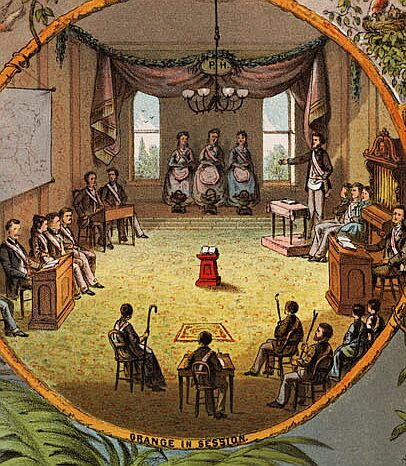
Grange in session, 1873

When the Grange first began in 1867, it borrowed some of its rituals and symbols from Freemasonry, including oaths, secret meetings, and special passwords necessary to keep railroad spies out of their meetings. Like Masons, Grangers were expected to wear expensive regalia during meetings, including sashes, stars, and jewels. Prospective "laborers" were required to listen to lectures about morality and travel up the hierarchy once initiated. The Grange’s hierarchy was similar to a military structure, facilitating the initiation of many Civil War veterans into the organization. The Grange copied ideas from Greek, Roman and Christian mythology. Small, ceremonial farm tools are often displayed at Grange meetings. Elected officers are in charge of opening and closing each meeting. Grange members referred to each other as "brother" and “sister," and called the local leader "Worthy Master." There are seven degrees of Grange membership; the ceremony of each degree relates to the seasons and various symbols and principles.

== Economic goals ==
While organizing local subordinates, Grangers were encouraged to "work together cooperatively, dispense with greedy middlemen, ensure cheap transportation, and break monopolistic practices."

== Organization ==
The Grange is a hierarchical organization ranging from local communities to the National Grange organization. At the local level are community Granges, otherwise known as subordinate Granges. All members are affiliated with at least one subordinate. In most states, multiple subordinate Granges are grouped together to form Pomona Granges. Typically, Pomona Granges are made up of all the subordinates in a county. Next in the order come State Granges, which is where the Grange begins to be especially active in the political process. State masters (presidents) are responsible for supervising the administration of Subordinate and Pomona Granges.

Together, 35 State Granges, as well as Potomac Grange #1 in Washington, D.C., form the National Grange. The National Grange represents the interests of most Grangers in lobbying activities similar to the state, but on a much larger scale. In addition, the National Grange oversees the Grange ritual. The Grange is a grassroots organization; virtually all policy originates at the subordinate level. The motto of the Grange is In necessariis unitas, in dubiis libertas, in omnibus caritas ("In essentials, unity; in non-essentials, liberty; in all things, charity"). Indeed, the word "grange" comes from a Latin word for grain, and is related to a "granary" or, generically, a farm.

=== Women ===
The organization was unusual at its founding, because women and any teen old enough to draw a plow (aged 14 to 16) were encouraged to participate in local work. Granges also required that four (one third) of elected positions had to be held by women. Most policy work at this time occurred at the Pomona county level, among male delegates. Women were expected to "promote virtue" among men and children. At the Grange’s founding, women were required to pay only 50 cents in initiation fees compared to three dollars for men. For the Minnesota state Grange, women had monthly dues of 10 cents while men paid 20. Sarah Baird, a member of the Minnehaha (Minnesota) Grange was the first woman to become State Worthy Master in 1894.

== Notable people ==
Grange membership badge from Plainville, New York

- D. Wyatt Aiken (1828–1887), South Carolina. Member of the United States House of Representatives
- Harold J. Arthur (1904–1971), Vermont. 68th Governor of Vermont
- Nahum J. Bachelder (1854–1934), New Hampshire. 49th Governor of New Hampshire
- Charles J. Bell (1845–1909), Vermont. 50th Governor of Vermont
- Robert Bergland (1928–2018), Minnesota. 20th United States Secretary of Agriculture
- Charles F. Brannan (1903–1992), Colorado. 14th United States Secretary of Agriculture
- Frank Carlson (1893–1987), Kansas. 30th Governor of Kansas, United States Senator
- Ezra S. Carr (1819–1894), California. 7th California State Superintendent of Public Instruction. Professor of Agriculture at the University of California, Berkeley
- Norman Jay Coleman (1827–1911), New York. 1st United States Secretary of Agriculture
- Ignatius L. Donnelly (1831–1901), Minnesota. Member of the U.S. House of Representatives and pseudoscientist
- Henry C. Groseclose (born 1892), Virginia. Founder of the Future Farmers of Virginia and Future Farmers of America
- Aaron B. Grosh (1803–1884), Founder of the National Grange. First Chaplain of the National Grange
- Caroline A. Hall (1838–1918), Founder of the National Grange
- Mark Hatfield (1922–2011), Oregon. 29th Governor of Oregon, United States Senator
- William M. Ireland (died 1891), Founder of the National Grange. First Treasurer of the National Grange
- Oliver Hudson Kelley (1826–1913). Agriculturalist, organizer. Primary founder of the Order of Patrons of Husbandry. First Secretary of the National Grange
- Evander M. Law (1836–1920). Confederate general and organizer of the Alabama Grange
- David Lubin (1849–1919), California. Founder of the California Fruit Growers Union and U.S. delegate to the International Institute of Agriculture
- Cyrus G. Luce (1824–1905), Michigan. 21st Governor of Michigan
- James W. Marshall (1810–1885). Discoverer of California Gold. Charter member of Pilot Hill Grange #1 California
- Francis Marion McDowell (1831–1894). Founder of the National Grange. Second Treasurer of the National Grange
- James Nesmith (1820–1885), Oregon. United States Senator from Oregon
- Herschel D. Newsom (1905–1970), Indiana. 16th Master of the National Grange
- Krist Novoselic (born 1965), Washington. Bass guitarist for the rock band Nirvana
- Walter M. Pierce (1861–1954), Oregon. 17th Governor of Oregon
- Gifford Pinchot (1865–1946), Pennsylvania. 28th Governor of Pennsylvania
- Frederick Robie (1822–1912), Maine. 39th Governor of Maine
- Robert P. Robinson (1869–1939), Delaware. 57th Governor of Delaware
- Norman Rockwell (1894–1978), Vermont. American painter
- Eleanor Roosevelt (1884–1962), New York. First Lady of the United States of America
- Franklin D. Roosevelt (1882–1945), New York. 32nd President of the United States of America
- Ellen Alida Rose (born 1843), agriculturist, suffragist
- William Saunders (1822–1900). Botanist, landscaper, designer of Soldiers Cemetery in Gettysburg, PA. Founder of the National Grange. First Master/President of the National Grange
- Norman Schwarzkopf Sr. (1895–1958), New Jersey. 1st head of the New Jersey State Police. Member of Pioneer Grange #1
- John Strentzel (1813–1890), California. California pioneer, father-in-law of John Muir
- John R. Thompson (1834–1894). Founder of the National Grange. First Lecturer/Program Director of the National Grange
- John Trimble (1831–1902). Founder of the National Grange. Third Secretary of the National Grange
- Harry S. Truman (1884–1972), Missouri. 33rd President of the United States of America

== See also ==
- American Farm Bureau Federation
- Farmer's Alliance
- List of Grange Hall buildings
- Order of the Sovereigns of Industry
- National Farmers Organization
- National Farmers Union (United States)
