= Herschel D. Newsom =

American activist (1905–1970)

Herschel Davis Newsom (May 1, 1905 – July 2, 1970) was the 16th master of the National Grange (1950–1968), a foundation that promotes education, service and legislation in benefit of American farm families. He grew up on a farm in Sand Creek Township, Bartholomew County, Indiana, outside Columbus, Indiana and graduated from Indiana University Bloomington with a B.A. in chemistry in 1926. He later earned the university's Distinguished Alumni award in 1960. He held appointments from President Truman, President Eisenhower, and President Kennedy such as Citizens' Commission on International Cooperation, President's Rural Safety Council, and Citizens' Committee for International Development. He was elected President of the International Federation of Agricultural Producers (IFAP) in 1963 as well as held several Presidential appointments to advisory positions, including the Committee on Trade Negotiations. In 1964, he founded the Grange Foundation. In 1968, he was appointed by Lyndon Johnson to the U.S. Tariff Commission. He died on July 2, 1970, in Washington, D.C.
