= Cedarcliff Gatehouse =

- U.S. National Register of Historic Places
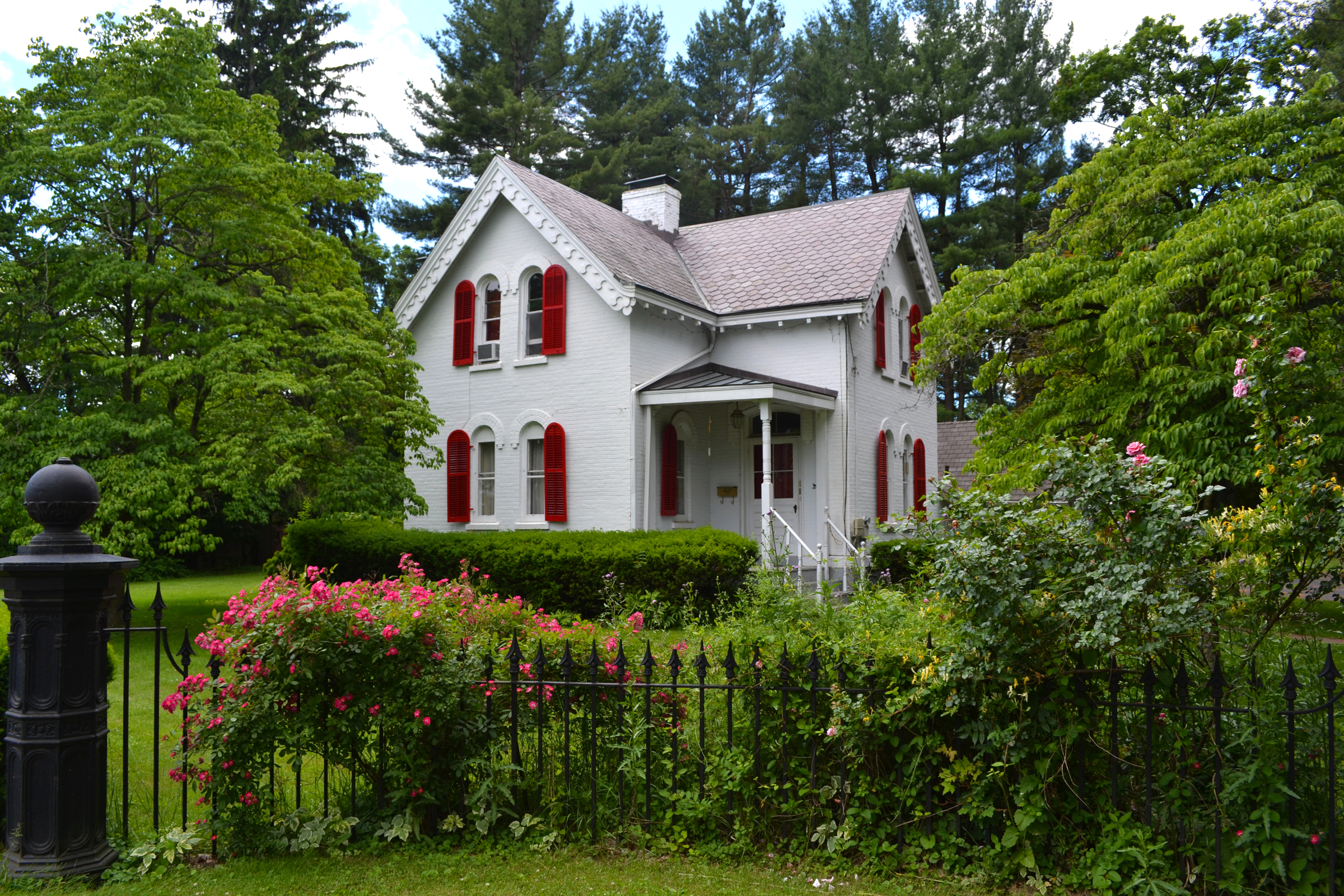
- The gatehouse in June 2013.

- Location within New York Location within the United States
- Location: 66 Ferris Lane, Poughkeepsie, New York
- Coordinates: 41°41′3.01″N 73°55′11.1″W
- Area: less than one acre
- Built: 1862
- Architect: George E. Woodward
- Architectural style: Gothic Revival
- MPS: Poughkeepsie MRA
- NRHP reference No.: 82001125
- Added to NRHP: November 26, 1982

Cedarcliff Gatehouse is a historic gatehouse located in Poughkeepsie, in Dutchess County, New York. It was likely designed by architect George E. Woodward and built about 1862 for Lindley M. Ferris. It is a 2 1/2-story, cruciform plan brick cottage in the Gothic Revival style. It features deep eaves with extended rafters and bargeboards with scroll-sawn overlay. The property includes a period cast iron gateway and fence.

It was added to the National Register of Historic Places in 1982.
