= Thomas Meehan (botanist) =

American botanist (1826–1901)

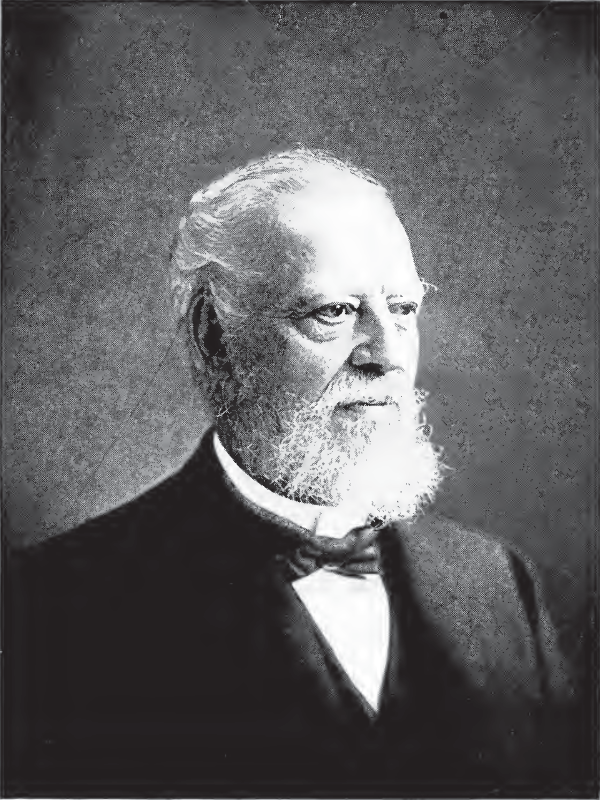
- Born: 21 March 1826; Potters Bar, England
- Died: 19 November 1901 (aged 75); Germantown, Pennsylvania, U.S.
- Citizenship: United States
- Known for: Meehans’ Mallow Marvels, Pink Dogwood
- Awards: Veitch Medal (1901)
- Scientific career
- Fields: Nurseryman, Botanist, Author, Legislator, Public Benefactor
- Workplaces: Kew Gardens, Bartram's Garden, Meehan's Nurseries

Thomas Meehan (21 March 1826 – 19 November 1901), was a noted British-born American nurseryman, botanist and author. He worked as a gardener in Kew between 1846 and 1848, moving afterwards to Germantown in Philadelphia. He was the founder of Meehan’s Monthly (1891–1901) and editor of Gardener’s Monthly (1859–1888).

== Life and work ==
Meehan was born in Potters Bar, which was in Middlesex at the time and is now in Hertfordshire, England. He grew up on the Isle of Wight where he went to school. His interest in plants was sparked by his father, who was a gardener for Colonel Francis Vernon Harcourt at St. Clare. He too worked with his father, raising a hybrid Fuchsia St. Clare. He published his first botanical contribution on Rubus at age nineteen, which led to his membership of the Wernernian Society. His knowledge and skills and recommendations from Dr Bromfield and C.C. Babington resulted in his securing a position at Kew Gardens from 1846 to 1848, where he was influenced by William Jackson Hooker. He was considered for the position of botanist on the Herald Expedition which was filled by Berthold Seemann. He left Kew and worked briefly for the Early of Shrewsbury, at Alton Towers. He left due to religious differences.

Meehan travelled to Philadelphia in 1848 and worked first for Robert Buist at his Rosedale Nursery, then between 1850 and 1852 for the owner of Bartram's Garden, who was pioneer locomotive builder Andrew M. Eastwick (1811–1879) and who, with Thomas De Kay and Joseph Harrison Jr., had contracted to build the first railroad in Russia. In 1854 Meehan started a nursery firm in partnership with William Saunders in Germantown, near Philadelphia, where he lived with his family for the rest of his life. When his business with Saunders ended, he started the Germantown Nurseries, which became Thomas Meehan & Sons in 1896. His brother Joseph Meehan (1840-1920) joined the firm in 1859. Thomas Meehan's three sons Thomas B. Meehan, Mendelson Meehan and J. Franklin Meehan also had notable careers while they ran the nursery. J. Franklin designed parks and golf courses including Spring Ford Country Club, Ashborne Country Club and North Hills (originally called Edge Hill Golf Club). He left Edge Hill to design Sandy Run Country Club, where he also served as its first president.

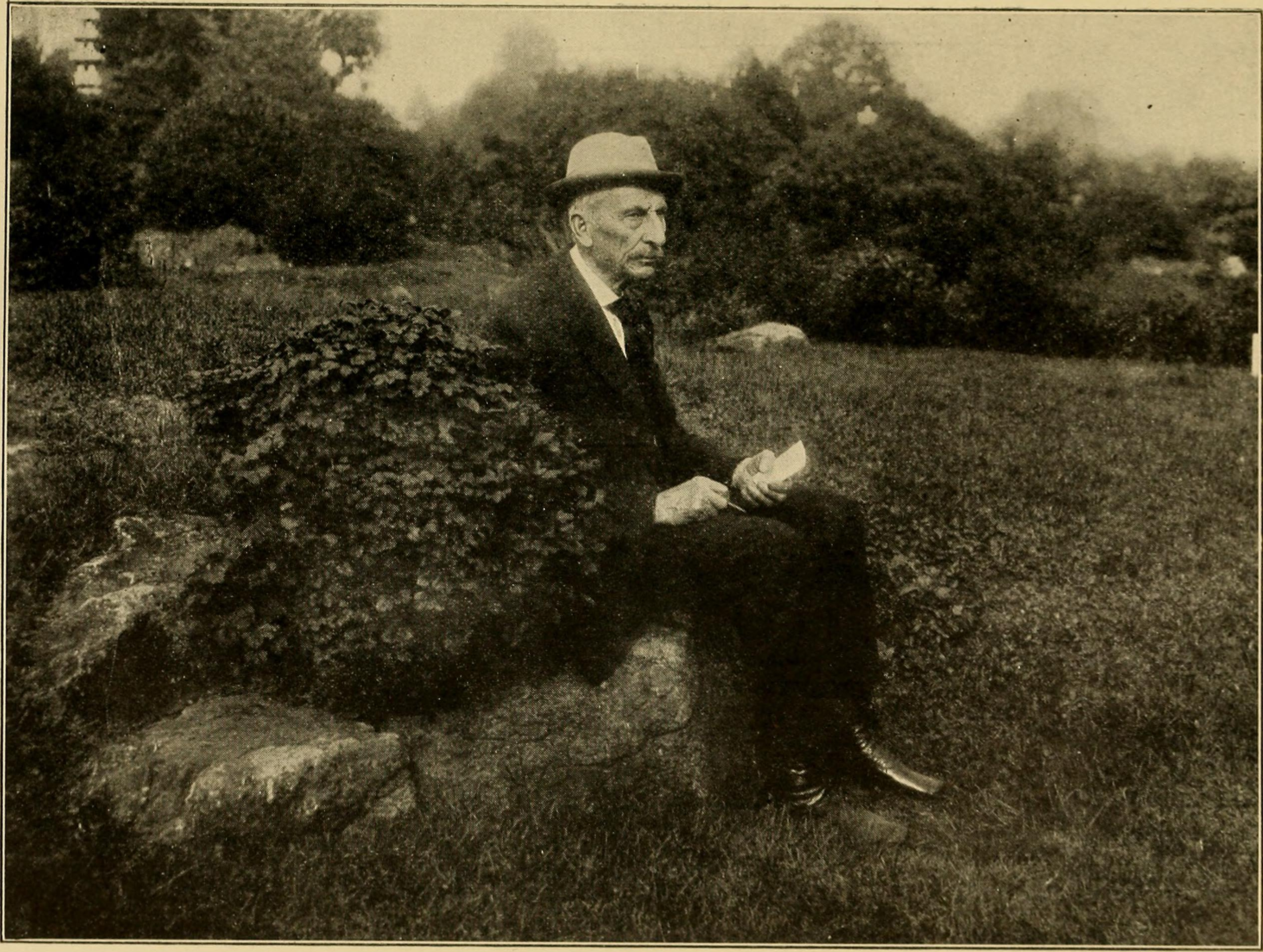
Joseph Meehan (1840-1920), younger brother of Thomas Meehan.

Meehan and family supplied plants to the United States and Europe for seven decades, expanding to cover 60 hectares in the twentieth century. Their specialty was ornamentals, such as Japanese maples. In 1888, Thomas Meehan rediscovered the Pink Dogwood Cornus florida var. rubra, which was thought to be extinct, along the banks of the Wissahickon Creek, which is now part of Philadelphia municipal park system. Meehan's researches in botany led to his being the editor of The Gardener’s Monthly (1859–1875), which then became The Gardener's Monthly and Horticulturist in 1876, and he was also editor of Meehans' Monthly (1891–1902), two horticultural journals with the largest circulation at that time. Meehan wrote his own agriculture columns for five newspapers and also authored 'The Native Flowers and Ferns of the United States', consisting of four volumes describing and illustrating, in colour, over 300 species.

Meehan was a member of the Historical Society of Pennsylvania, the American Association of Nurserymen, the Pennsylvania Horticultural Society, the American Pomological Society, the Academy of Natural Sciences, the American Association for the Advancement of Science and the American Philosophical Society. He was also an honorary member of the Royal Horticultural Society (London). He corresponded with foremost botanists William Darlington, Josiah Hoopes, William Saunders, George Engelmann, John Torrey, Asa Gray, Maxwell T. Masters, Ferdinand von Mueller, George Nicholson and Charles Darwin.

== Savior of Bartram's Garden ==
Meehan was a principal in the saving of Bartram's Garden, Philadelphia, PA.

Bartram's Garden is the oldest surviving botanic garden in the United States. John Bartram (1699–1777), the well-known early American botanist, explorer, and plant collector, founded the garden in September 1728 when he purchased a 102-acre (0.41 km2) farm in Kingsessing Township, Philadelphia County. Following the American Revolution, Bartram's sons John Bartram, Jr. (1743–1812) and William Bartram (1739–1823), continued the international trade in plants. They expanded the family's botanic garden and nursery business. Following his father's lead, William became an important naturalist, artist, and author in his own right.

After 1812, Ann Bartram Carr (1779–1858), a daughter of John Bartram, Jr., maintained the family garden and business with her husband Colonel Robert Carr (1778–1866) and his son John Bartram Carr (1804–1839). Their commercial activities remained focused on international trade in native North American plants. Domestic demand also grew under their management.

In 1850, financial difficulties led to the historic garden's sale outside of the 122 year ownership by the family to Andrew M. Eastwick (1811–1879), who preserved it as a private park for his estate. Upon Eastwick's 1879 death, the Eastwick family wished to sell the Garden which, being proximate to downtown Philadelphia and lying alongside of the Schulkill River, was at risk for development.

A campaign to preserve the garden was organized by Meehan, in Philadelphia. A national campaign for funds was aided by Charles S. Sargent of the Arnold Arboretum in Boston, Massachusetts. In 1891, control of the site was turned over to the City of Philadelphia. It remains protected as a city park. Since that time, the John Bartram Association, formally organized in 1893, has overseen preservation efforts and historical interpretation of the garden, the John Bartram House, and a number of surviving outbuildings.

The garden's plant collection includes only a few extant examples dating from the Bartram family occupancy; however, documentation of what was once in cultivation is rich. The first century of public ownership left the garden lacking in terms of care and interpretation. Despite the disappearance of a number of subsidiary physical elements in the landscape, the garden's rectilinear framework designed and laid out by Bartram during the second quarter of the eighteenth century is still recognizable.

Thanks to efforts of Meehan and Charles S. Sargent, Bartram's House and Garden's physical endurance demonstrates eighteenth- and nineteenth-century botanic studies, the North American plant and seed business, and period domestic life in Philadelphia.

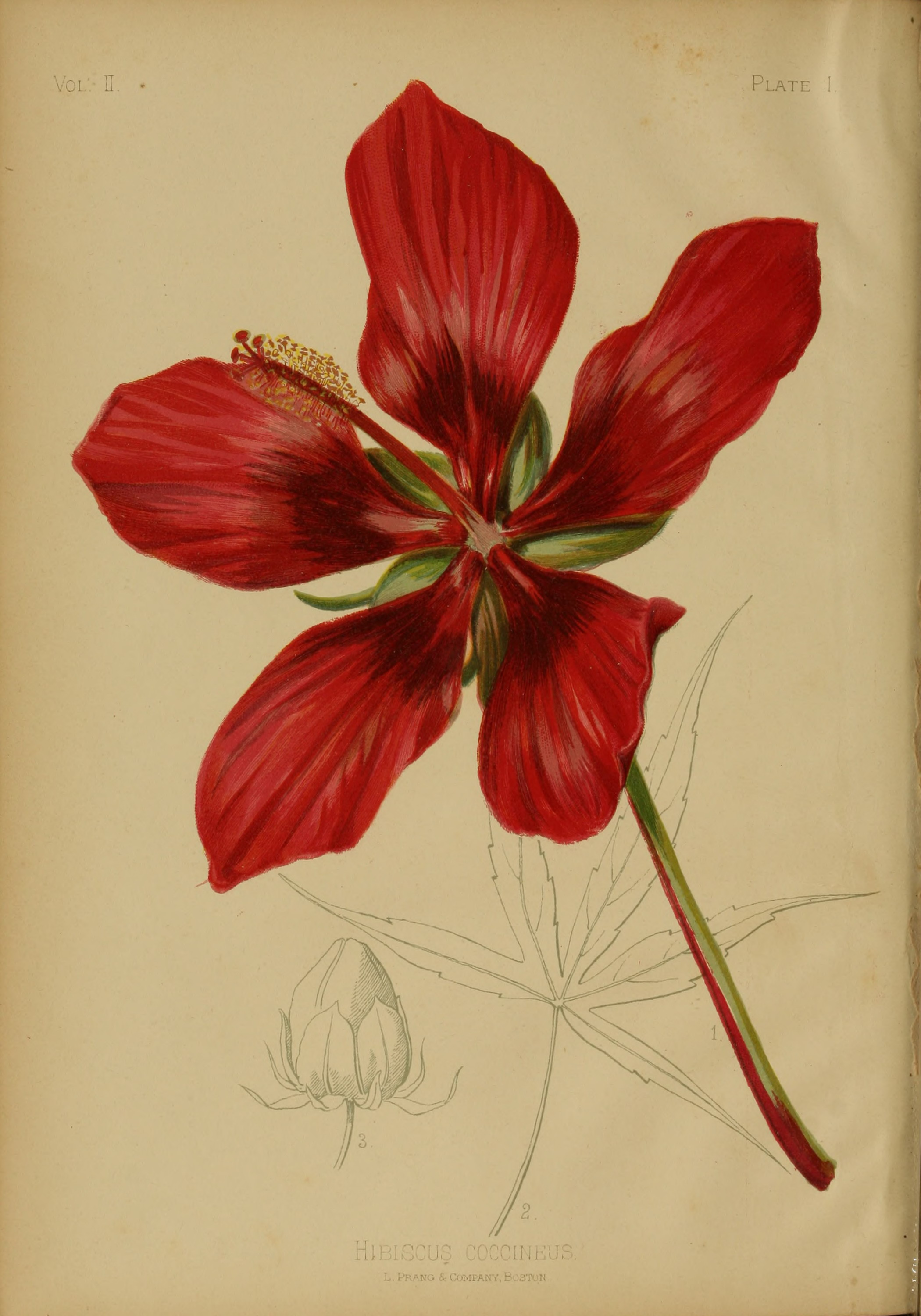
Hibiscus coccineus
by Alois Lunzer from The Native Flowers and Ferns of the United States, Volume II by Thomas Meehan

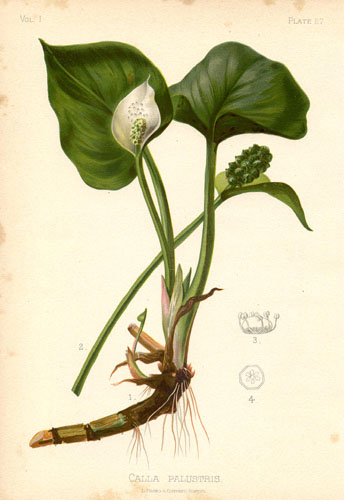
Calla palustris
by Alois Lunzer from The Native Flowers and Ferns of the United States

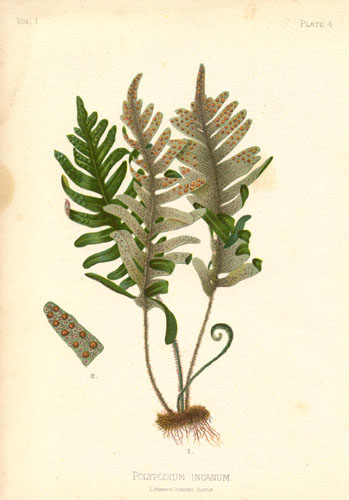
Polypodium incanum
by Alois Lunzer from The Native Flowers and Ferns of the United States

== The Meehan Family ==
Thomas Meehan married his wife Catharine Emma Colflesh in 1852; he was survived by his wife and six children: William E. Meehan, Thomas B. Meehan, J. Franklin Meehan, S. Mendelson Meehan, Sarah D. Meehan Lanning and Frances G. Meehan Burn. William was Commissioner of Fisheries for Pennsylvania; while his other three sons managed the Nursery Firm of Thomas Meehan & Sons, Inc.

His great-grandson, Thomas Meehan III (1921-1944), was the First Lieutenant and Commanding Officer of Easy Company, who perished along with his entire plane of 21 men when it was hit by flak and crashed during D-Day, on June 6, 1944. The story of Easy Company has been immortalized in Stephen Ambrose’s classic war story Band of Brothers. In the TV miniseries version, Meehan was played by Jason O'Mara.

== Publications ==
- The American Handbook of Ornamental Trees (Philadelphia, 1853)
- The Native Flowers and Ferns of the United States, 4 vols. (1878–1880) Thomas Meehan, Alois Lunzer (1840–?) and lithographed by Louis Prang (1824–1909) (Boston 1879)
- Wayside Flowers (1881)
- Contributions to the Life History of Plants (16 parts) (Proceedings of the Academy of Natural Sciences of Philadelphia, 1887–1902).
