= Samuel Hallett =

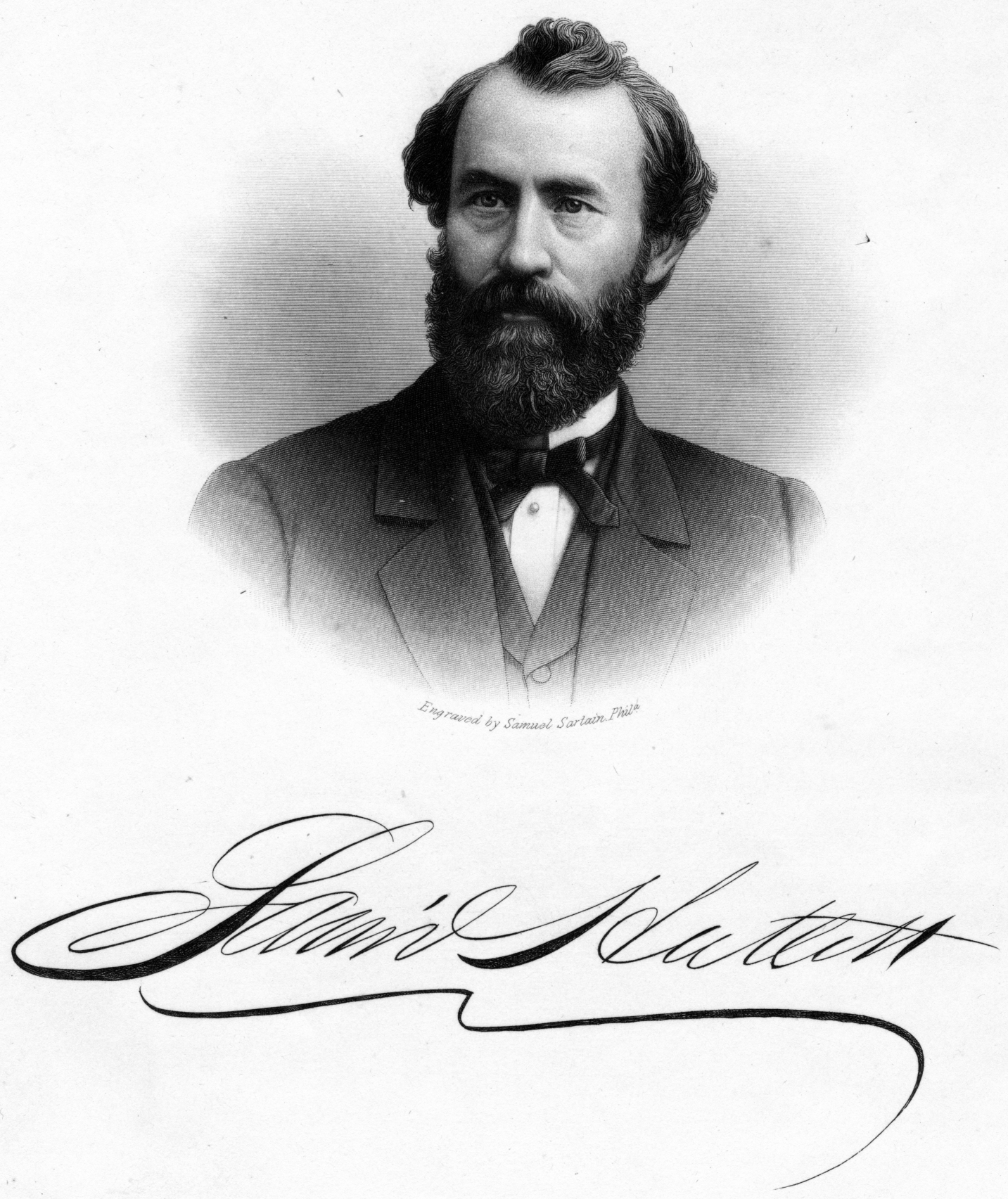
Samuel Hallett

The Hallett House (Aisle of Pines) in the late 1800s

Samuel Hallett (c. 1827 – July 27, 1864) was an American railroad developer, particularly known for the initial development of the eastern branch of the Union Pacific Railroad and then the Kansas Pacific Railway.

== Life ==
Hallett was born in Canisteo, New York. In 1848 he married Ann Elizabeth McDowell of Wayne, New York, sister to Francis M. McDowell. Hallett and the McDowell brothers, along with Civil War General Nirom Crane, engaged in a number of enterprises including the Hallett & Co. Bank in New York City. In 1854 he built a large mansion in his wife's home town, known as the "Hallett House" or "The Aisle of Pines". He unsuccessfully ran for congress in 1856.

In 1863 Hallett’s firm, in association with John C. Fremont, bought the controlling interest in the Leavenworth, Pawnee and Western railroad. This line became the Union Pacific Eastern Division and then the Kansas Pacific Railway. They soon ran short of money and Hallett went before Congress to get additional funds for the road. After a dispute with Hallett, Fremont withdrew but Hallett took over and continued construction of the Kansas link of the railroad to the Pacific.

The process of building the railroad was highly political, and in the political maneuvering, Hallett came into conflict with the chief engineer of the Kansas Pacific, Orlando A. Talcott. Talcott, in a letter to president Abraham Lincoln, accused Hallett of substandard construction of the railroad. This letter was referred to the interior secretary John Palmer Usher who was a close friend of Hallett, and so Hallett was informed of it. As a result, Talcott was physically assaulted by one of Hallett's brothers in Wyandotte, Kansas (across the Kansas River from Kansas City, Kansas). On July 27, 1864, Talcott retaliated by shooting Samuel Hallett dead in the streets of Wyandotte.
