= Capt. William Hallett House =

Historic house in Massachusetts, United States

- U.S. National Register of Historic Places
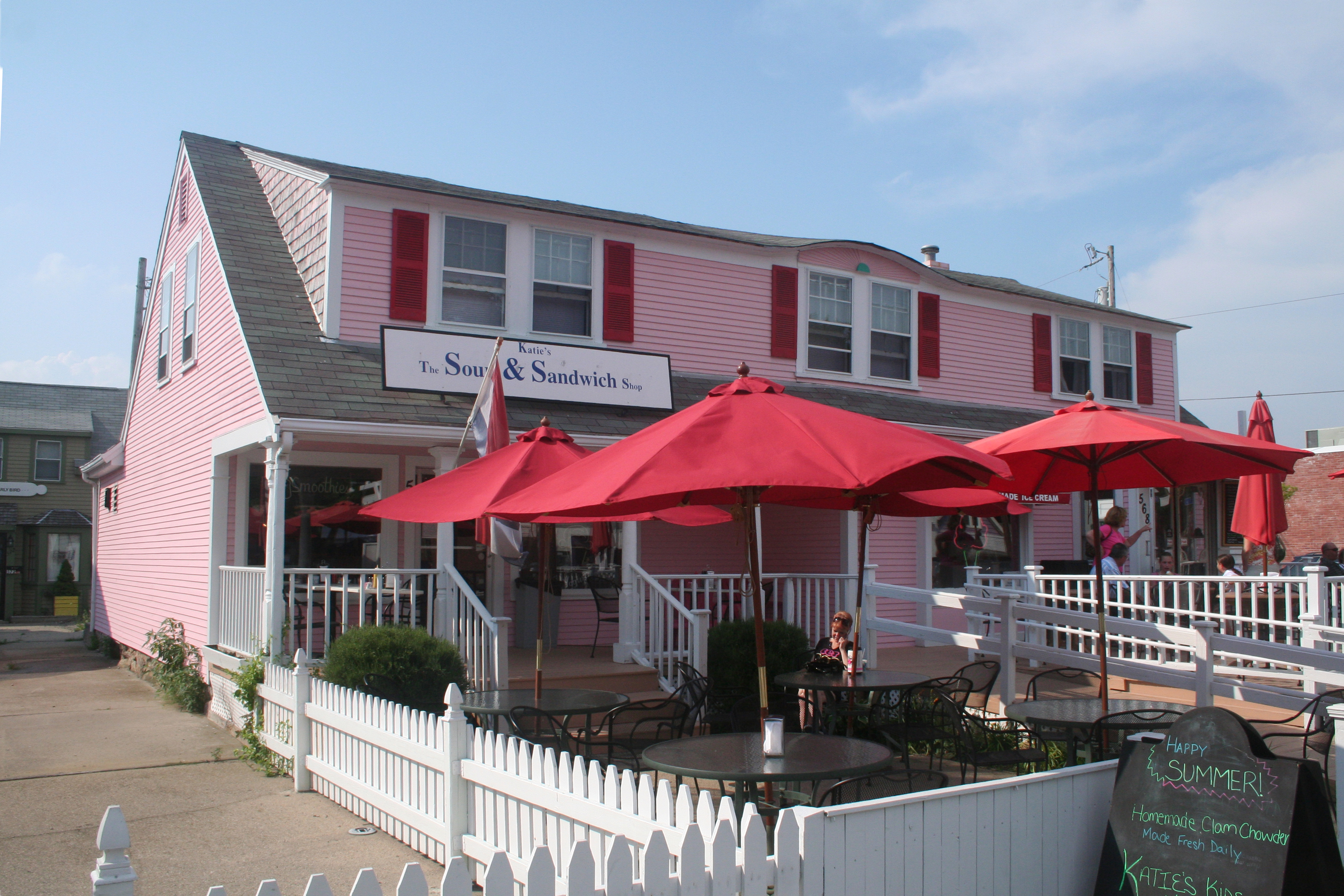

- Location within Cape Cod Location within Massachusetts Location within the United States
- Location: 570 Main Street, Barnstable, Massachusetts
- Coordinates: 41°38′59″N 70°17′24″W
- Built: 1800
- Architectural style: Queen Anne, Federal
- MPS: Barnstable MRA
- NRHP reference No.: 87000296
- Added to NRHP: September 18, 1987

The Capt. William Hallett House is a historic house in the Hyannis village of Barnstable, Massachusetts, USA.

== Description and history ==
This 1 1/2-story wood-frame house was built c. 1800, and exhibits a distinctive combination of Federal and Queen Anne styling. While its basic form is that of a Federal-style Cape, it was altered in the late 19th century, adding a shed-roof dormer with an eyebrow section, a porch with turned posts, and a projecting window bay. In the mid-19th century the house belonged to William Hallett, a ship's captain, and around the turn of the 20th century by Dr. Charles Harris, a noted local physician and author of Hyannis Sea Captains.

The house was listed on the National Register of Historic Places on September 18, 1987.

== See also ==
- National Register of Historic Places listings in Barnstable County, Massachusetts
