= Seth Hallett House =

Historic house in Massachusetts, United States

- U.S. National Register of Historic Places
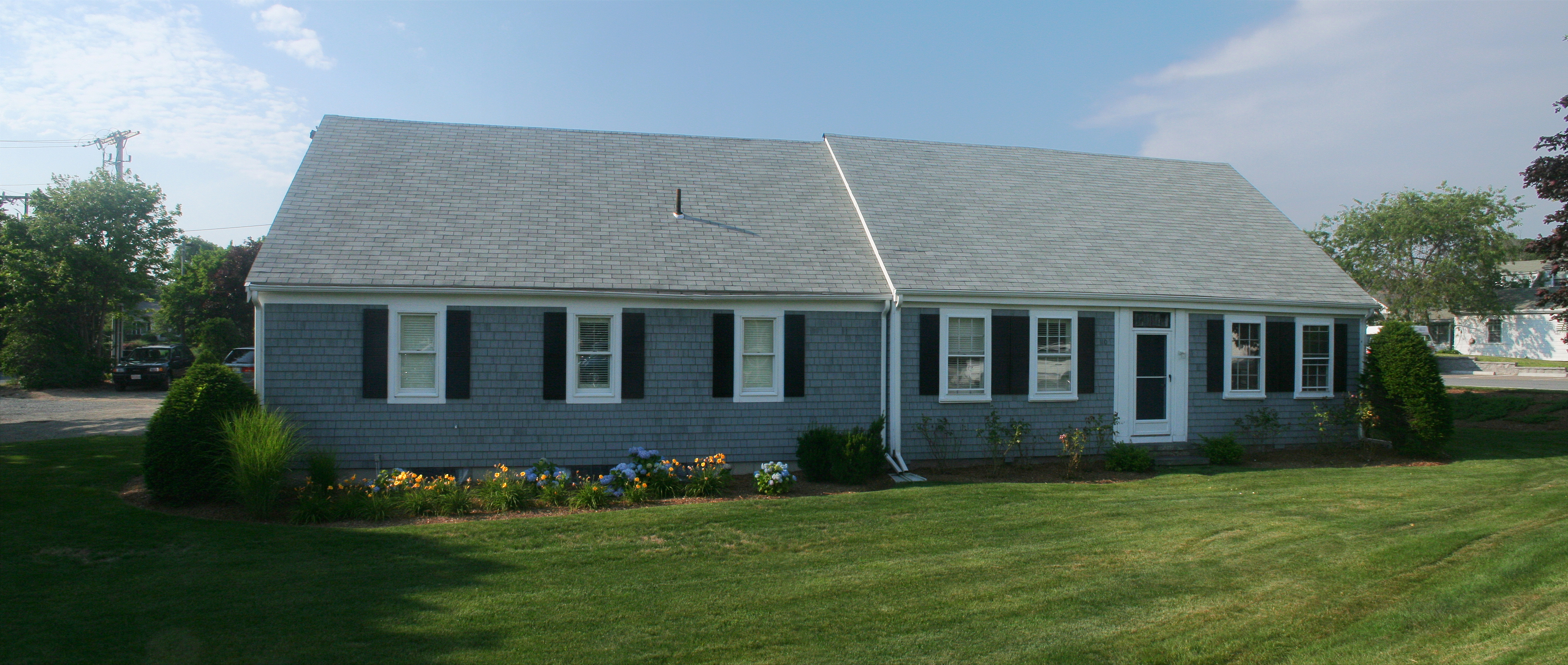

- Location within Cape Cod Location within Massachusetts Location within the United States
- Location: 110 Main Street, Barnstable, Massachusetts
- Coordinates: 41°39′22″N 70°16′32″W
- Built: 1775
- Architectural style: Federal
- MPS: Barnstable MRA
- NRHP reference No.: 87000298
- Added to NRHP: September 18, 1987

The Seth Hallett House is a historic house in the Hyannis village of Barnstable, Massachusetts. Built in 1775, this 1 1/2-story Cape house is one of the few surviving Federal style houses on Main Street in Hyannis. In the mid-19th century it was occupied by Seth Hallett, a town selectman. The house was listed on the National Register of Historic Places in 1987.

== Description and history ==
The Hallett House is set at the northeast corner of Main and Camp Streets in the village of Hyannis. It is a 1 1/2-story Cape style house, five bays wide, with a side gable roof, a central chimney (not original), and wood shingle siding. An ell of early construction extends to the rear of the main block, while a modern but sympathetically styled addition extends the house three bays to the left. The main entrance is centered on the original block, with simple pilasters on either side and a narrow transom window above.

Construction of the house is estimated to have been in about 1775, but nothing is known of its early owners. It was owned by Seth Hallett, a town selectman, in the mid-19th century. It presently houses a medical practice.

== See also ==
- National Register of Historic Places listings in Barnstable County, Massachusetts
