= The Horticulturist (magazine) =

Monthly horticulture magazine

The Horticulturist and Journal of Rural Art and Rural Taste
- Editor: A. J. Downing from 1846 to 1852
- Categories: Horticulture
- Frequency: Monthly
- First issue: July 1846, Vol. 1, No. 1
- Final issue: December 1875, Vol. 30, No. 354
- Company: Luther Tucker, Albany, New York, vols. 1–7; T. Vick, Rochester, New York, vols. 8–9; R. P. Smith, Philadelphia, vols. 10–12
- Country: United States
- Language: English

The Horticulturist and Journal of Rural Art and Rural Taste was a monthly magazine on "horticulture, landscape gardening, rural architecture, embellishments, pomology, floriculture, and all subjects of rural life, literature, art, and taste".

A. J. Downing, the famous landscape designer, horticulturist, and journalist, founded the magazine in 1846 and edited it until his death in 1852. After Downing died there were several different editors, including Patrick Barry (1816–1890), John Jay Smith (1798–1881), and Henry T. Williams. In 1875 the Horticulturist and Journal of Rural Art and Rural Taste was merged with The Gardener's Monthly and Horticultural Advertiser and published from 1876 to 1888 under the title The Gardener's Monthly and Horticulturist. Thomas Meehan was then the editor.

A.J. Downing was offered the editorship of The horticulturist in 1846, due to his extensive knowledge of plants as well as his growing fame from the publication of his books. He used the position to promote his ideas on improving rural architecture, and over the years, included several editorial essays on the topic. The magazine also covered news of plants and was notable for its extensive (for the time) etched and lithographed illustrations. This was not a farmer’s magazine but rather a publication for horticultural enthusiasts, typically “gentleman farmers.” They were the audience for whom a “country villa” might be an appropriate aspiration, but who also might encourage improvements in rural architecture by building small, picturesque cottages on their property for workmen and their families.

== See also ==
- List of horticultural magazines
