= William Saunders (botanist) =

Scottish-American botanist (1822–1900)

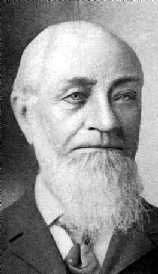
- Born: December 7, 1822; St. Andrews, Scotland
- Died: September 11, 1900 (aged 77)
- Education: Madras College; University of Edinburgh
- Occupations: Horticulturist; Landscape designer; Nurseryman
- Known for: Landscape design of cemeteries such as Gettysburg National Cemetery and Oak Ridge Cemetery; Introducing new plant species to the United States; Founding The National Grange
- Scientific career
- Workplaces: United States Department of Agriculture
- Author abbrev. (botany): W.Saunders

William Saunders (December 7, 1822 – September 11, 1900) was a Scottish-American horticulturist, landscape designer, and nurseryman. He was among the first landscape architects employed by the federal government, and served for thirty-eight years with the United States Department of Agriculture. Saunders was a founder of the National Grange or Patrons of Husbandry, designed Soldiers' National Cemetery at Gettysburg, planned and developed the Washington, D.C. park system, introduced many plant species to the United States, and authored several articles on horticulture.

== Early life ==
William Saunders was born on December 7, 1822, in St. Andrews, Scotland. In 1834, he enrolled at Madras College in St. Andrews, where he became interested in horticulture and landscape gardening. He studied horticulture at the University of Edinburgh and later received practical training at Kew Gardens. He also worked as an apprentice gardener on several large estates in London. Saunders married Martha Mildwaters in 1848 and emigrated to the United States. He became an American citizen in 1857.

Saunders initially worked as a gardener on the estate of William Bostwick in New Haven, Connecticut. In the 1850s, he moved to Baltimore, Maryland, where he was employed on the estate of Johns Hopkins. In addition to managing the estate farm, Saunders designed landscape features, including lakes and flower gardens.

During this time, Saunders wrote articles on horticultural topics, which were published in journals such as The Horticulturalist, Hovey's Magazine of Horticulture, The Farmer and Gardener, and The Philadelphia Florist. Many of his articles contained advice on propagating fruit trees and grapevines.

In 1854, Saunders partnered with horticulturalist Thomas Meehan, whom he had met while working together at Kew Gardens. Together, they established a nursery and collaborated on public park projects, cemeteries, and residential site plans. Saunders' cemetery designs included Rose Hill Cemetery in Chicago and Oak Ridge Cemetery in Springfield, Illinois. He also developed plans for cemeteries in Perth Amboy, Rahway, New Jersey, and Bethlehem, Pennsylvania.

== Department of Agriculture ==
In 1862, Saunders was hired as the superintendent of the experimental gardens at the newly created Department of Agriculture, where he remained for the rest of his life. At the time, the organization was called the Bureau of Agriculture and did not achieve cabinet status until 1889. During his thirty-eight-year career, Saunders contributed to landscape design and horticulture.

=== Landscape design ===
Saunders was selected by a committee of Union governors in 1863 to design the Soldiers' National Cemetery in Gettysburg. Saunders and the committee designed the cemetery on a radial plan centered around a central monument, grouping the Union dead by state. The graves were marked with rectangular slabs of gray granite inscribed with the name, rank, and company of each soldier. He explained that this repetition of "objects in themselves simple and commonplace" was intended to evoke a sense of "solemnity." Saunders included uncommon varieties of trees and shrubs to frame the site, many of which he had recently introduced to America.

Before Lincoln left for Gettysburg to deliver his address, he met with Saunders to review the cemetery design. Saunders later wrote, "[Lincoln] was much pleased with the method of the graves, saying it differed from the ordinary cemetery, and after I had explained the reasons, said it was an admirable and befitting arrangement."

In 1865, after Lincoln's assassination, Saunders was asked to design the landscape for a Lincoln monument at Oak Ridge Cemetery, the same cemetery he had originally planned in 1861. His design featured open areas of lawn and groupings of non-native trees, including magnolias, arborvitae, and mock orange.

Saunders also designed the landscaping for the west facade of the Capitol and other locations in the capital. As president of the Washington Parking Commission, he oversaw the planting of 80,000 trees, which contributed to the city becoming known as the "City of Trees."

=== Horticulture ===
Saunders was appointed head of the newly created United States Department of Agriculture (USDA) Experimental Gardens in 1862 and remained in the position until his death in 1900. He defined the mission of the organization and established its operating guidelines in his "Catalogue of the Plants, Bulbs, Tubers, Etc., for Distribution from the U.S. Propagating Garden with a Report on the Objectives and Aims of the Garden" (1862). It was the first publication of the USDA.

His guidelines called for the USDA to procure new and better plants for the country and "ascertain, by experiment, the influences of varied culture" and "investigate more thoroughly the various maladies and diseases of plants and the insects that destroy them."

Between 1865 and 1867, the USDA Experimental Garden evaluated more than 120 wheats, 167 ryes, 230 melon varieties, 70 peas, 50 grass species for hay production, and over 500 strawberries, grapes, apples, and pears. The results of this work were published and made available to farmers.

Using this experimental approach, Saunders introduced hundreds of economically important plants, including the Japanese persimmon, the Eucalyptus globulus tree, the Japanese cedar (Cryptomeria japonica), the camphor tree, one of the first magnolia trees in Washington, D.C., and others. About 300 varieties of winter-hardy apples from Russia were evaluated and introduced into the United States.

The navel orange was Saunders' most well-known plant introduction. In 1871, he received a dozen young orange trees from Bahia, Brazil. The fruit was described as large, sweet, and seedless. Saunders presented two of the trees to Eliza Tibbets, who moved to Riverside, California. The trees thrived in the California climate, and orchards of this citrus variety became widespread in Southern California. According to the 1937 "USDA Yearbook of Agriculture," the introduction of the Washington navel orange was "one of the outstanding events in the economic and social development of California."

=== Grange ===
Saunders supported the interests and economic welfare of American farmers. In 1867, he and six colleagues founded the National Grange, an organization dedicated to promoting the economic and political well-being of agriculture and rural communities. Saunders authored the Grange's constitution and was elected its first Master, a position he held for six years. During his tenure, Saunders advocated for women's participation and representation in the organization.

== See also ==
- Central Experimental Farm
- Ornamental Gardens, Ottawa

== Works ==
During his lifetime, Saunders published articles on horticulture, agriculture, and landscape design. Some of his notable works include:

- Journal, 1898. United States Department of Agriculture Library, Washington, D.C.
- "Landscape Gardening." The Report of the Commission of Agriculture for the Year 1869. Washington, D.C.: U.S. Government Printing Office.
- "Landscape Decorative and Economic Gardening." In City Homes, Country Houses and Church Architecture or the American Builders' Journal, by Samuel Sloan. Philadelphia, PA: Claxton, Remsen, and Haffelfinger; 1871.
- "Remarks on the Design for the Soldiers' National Cemetery, Gettysburg, Pennsylvania." Revised Report Made to the Legislature of Pennsylvania Relative to the Soldiers' National Cemetery at Gettysburg. Harrisburg, PA: Singerly and Myers, State Printers.
- Saunders, William (1855). "Evergreen Shrubs". The Horticulturist. Vol. V. Philadelphia: Robert Pearsall Smith. pp. 162–166 – via HathiTrust.
- Saunders, William (1855). "Planting Shrubberies". The Horticulturist. Vol. V. Philadelphia: Robert Pearsall Smith. pp. 300–302 – via HathiTrust.
- Saunders, William (1855). "Construction of Roads and Walks". The Horticulturist. Vol. V. Philadelphia: Robert Pearsall Smith. pp. 363–366 – via HathiTrust.
- Saunders, William (1855). "Designs for Improving Country Residences, No. 1". The Horticulturist. Vol. V. Philadelphia: Robert Pearsall Smith. pp. 403–405 – via HathiTrust.
- Saunders, William (1855). "When and How to Plant Trees". The Horticulturist. Vol. V. Philadelphia: Robert Pearsall Smith. pp. 495–498 – via HathiTrust.
- Saunders, William (1856). "Designs for Improving Country Residences, No. 2". The Horticulturist. pp. 321–323.
- Saunders, William (1858). "Construction of Glass Houses". The Horticulturist. Vol. VIII. New York: C. M. Saxton. pp. 128–130 – via HathiTrust.
- Saunders, William (1858). "Plan for Hunting Park Between the Built Part of Philadelphia and Germantown". The Horticulturist. Vol. VIII. New York: C. M. Saxton. pp. 460–464 – via HathiTrust.
- Saunders, William (1859). "Graperies and Grape Growing". The Horticulturist. Vol. XIV. New York: C. M. Saxton, Barker & Co. pp. 418–422 – via HathiTrust.
- Saunders, William (1859). "Fruit Trees in Ornamental Plantations and Lawns". The Horticulturist. Vol. XIV. New York: C. M. Saxton, Barker & Co. pp. 443–446 – via HathiTrust.

== Sources ==
- Bailey, L. H. (1930). The Standard Cyclopedia of Horticulture (2nd ed.). New York: Macmillan. pp. 1594–1595.
- Harding, T. Swann (1947). Two Blades of Grass. Norman: University of Oklahoma Press.
- Kaplan, J. Kim (2013). "William Saunders: A Monumental Figure in USDA". Agricultural Research. 61 (8). US Department of Agriculture: 12–15.
- Rainey, Reuben (1995). "Saunders, William b. 1822, d. 1900". In Birnbaum, Charles A. (ed.). Pioneers of American Landscape Design II: An Annotated Bibliography. U.S. Department of the Interior. pp. 132–137. ISBN 0-16-048060-4.
- Reuther, Walter (1967). The Citrus Industry. Vol. 1 (Revised ed.). University of California. pp. 483–485.
