= Beacon High School =

Beacon High School may refer to:

- Beacon High School (Massachusetts), Watertown, Massachusetts
- Beacon High School in Beacon, New York
- The Beacon School, Manhattan, New York City
