= Bogardus-DeWindt House =

Historic house in New York, United States

- U.S. National Register of Historic Places
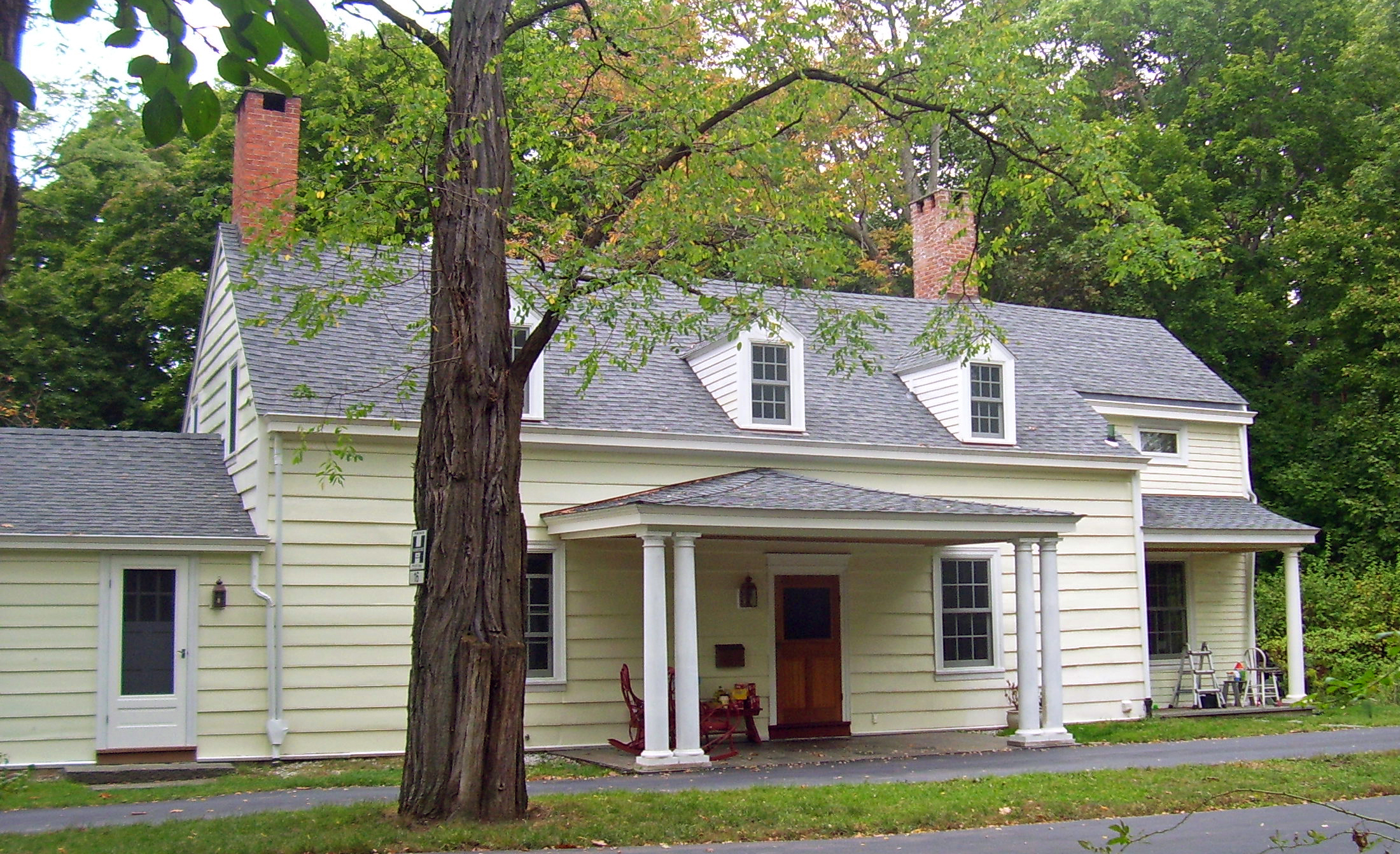
- House in 2007
- Location: Beacon, NY
- Coordinates: 41°30′45″N 73°58′40″W
- Area: 1 acre (3,920 m²)
- Built: c. 1800
- Architectural style: Federal
- NRHP reference No.: 93000280
- Added to NRHP: 1993

The Bogardus-DeWindt House is located on Tompkins Avenue, a short distance west of NY 9D, in Beacon, New York, United States. It typifies the houses built in the region between 1750 and 1830, and has largely remained in its original form even as newer housing has been built in the neighborhood.

During that time, the Hudson Valley was experiencing a new wave of settlement by New Englanders moving west. Their houses in the region combined their English-derived building traditions with Dutch ones dating to the late 17th century to create a new vernacular architecture unique to the place and time. The Bogardus-DeWindt house, a 1 1/2-story, five-by-two-bay rectangular building with heavy timber framing, epitomizes this style.

It was originally built on a four-acre (1.6 ha) parcel for Elizabeth Bogardus, widow of Peter, an early landowner whose estate had to be subdivided and sold to settle debts. She died a few years later and John Peter DeWindt bought the land and house as part of his Cedar Grove estate. In 1825 his mother moved into what the family called "the cottage". It remained in the family, undergoing the addition of a bay wing, and a barn and wood shed, in the 1880s.

The DeWindts sold it in 1920. Those owners added dormer windows upstairs and the columns on the front porch shortly after taking possession. Two decades later, the most recent addition, a small rear kitchen wing, was built.

== See also ==
- National Register of Historic Places listings in Dutchess County, New York
