= Lenny Torres =

American baseball player (born 2000)

Lancaster Stormers – No. 33
- Pitcher
- Born: October 15, 2000 (age 25); Poughkeepsie, New York, U.S.
- Bats: Right Throws: Right
- Stats at Baseball Reference

Lineras Torres Jr. (born October 15, 2000) is an American professional baseball pitcher for the Lancaster Stormers of the Atlantic League of Professional Baseball.

== Amateur career ==
Torres graduated from Beacon High School in Beacon, New York, where he played baseball. Between his junior and senior years, USA Baseball chose him for the national under-18 team. As a senior at Beacon, he pitched to a 0.68 earned run average while striking out 85 batters in 41 innings pitched. He committed to play college baseball for the St. John's Red Storm.

== Professional career ==
=== Cleveland Indians / Guardians ===
The Cleveland Indians selected Torres with the 41st selection of the 2018 Major League Baseball draft. Torres signed with the Indians on June 19 for $1.35 million. He made his professional debut with the Arizona League Indians and spent the whole season there, compiling a 1.76 ERA in six games (five starts). He underwent Tommy John surgery prior to the 2019 season, forcing him to miss the entirety of the season.

Torres did not play in a game in 2020 due to the cancellation of the minor league season because of the COVID-19 pandemic. He spent the 2021 season with the Lynchburg Hillcats, appearing in twenty games (19 starts) and going 2-7 with a 6.29 ERA and 73 strikeouts over 68 2/3 innings. Torres split 2022 between the rookie-level Arizona Complex League Guardians and High-A Lake County Captains. In 15 games (4 starts) for the two affiliates, he struggled to a 1–4 record and 6.48 ERA with 37 strikeouts across 33 1/3 innings pitched.

Torres returned in Lake County in 2023, making 34 appearances out of the bullpen and registering a 5–2 record and 5.03 ERA with 53 strikeouts and 8 saves across 39 1/3 innings pitched. He spent the 2024 campaign with the Double-A Akron RubberDucks, logging a 2–6 record and 2.26 ERA with 63 strikeouts and 7 saves over 51 2/3 innings of work. Torres elected free agency following the season on November 4, 2024.

=== Cincinnati Reds ===
On December 6, 2024, Torres signed a minor league contract with the Cincinnati Reds. He made 49 appearances for the Double-A Chattanooga Lookouts and Triple-A Louisville Bats in 2025, accumulating a 1–3 record and 5.88 ERA with 52 strikeouts and two saves over 49 innings of work. He elected free agency following the season on November 6.

=== Philadelphia Phillies ===
On December 15, 2025, Torres signed a minor league contract with the Philadelphia Phillies. He made 10 appearances split between the Double-A Reading Fightin Phils and Triple-A Lehigh Valley IronPigs, posting a cumulative 0-1 record and 6.94 ERA with 15 strikeouts and one save across 11 2/3 innings pitched. Torres was released by the Phillies organization on May 17, 2026.

=== Lancaster Stormers ===
On July 12, 2026, Torres signed with the Lancaster Stormers of the Atlantic League of Professional Baseball.
