= National Professional Basketball League =

There have been two professional basketball leagues known as the National Professional Basketball League.

- National Professional Basketball League (1950–51)
- National Professional Basketball League (2007–08)
