= NPBL =

NPBL is an acronym that can refer to the following:

- National Professional Basketball League (1950–1951) - a professional basketball league that played in the 1950–51 season.
- National Professional Basketball League (2007–2008) - a professional basketball league played two seasons in 2007–08.
- Nicaraguan Professional Baseball League
- Norfolk and Portsmouth Belt Line Railroad - a shortline railroad operating in southeastern Virginia.
