= Mt. Beacon Fire Observation Tower =

- U.S. National Register of Historic Places
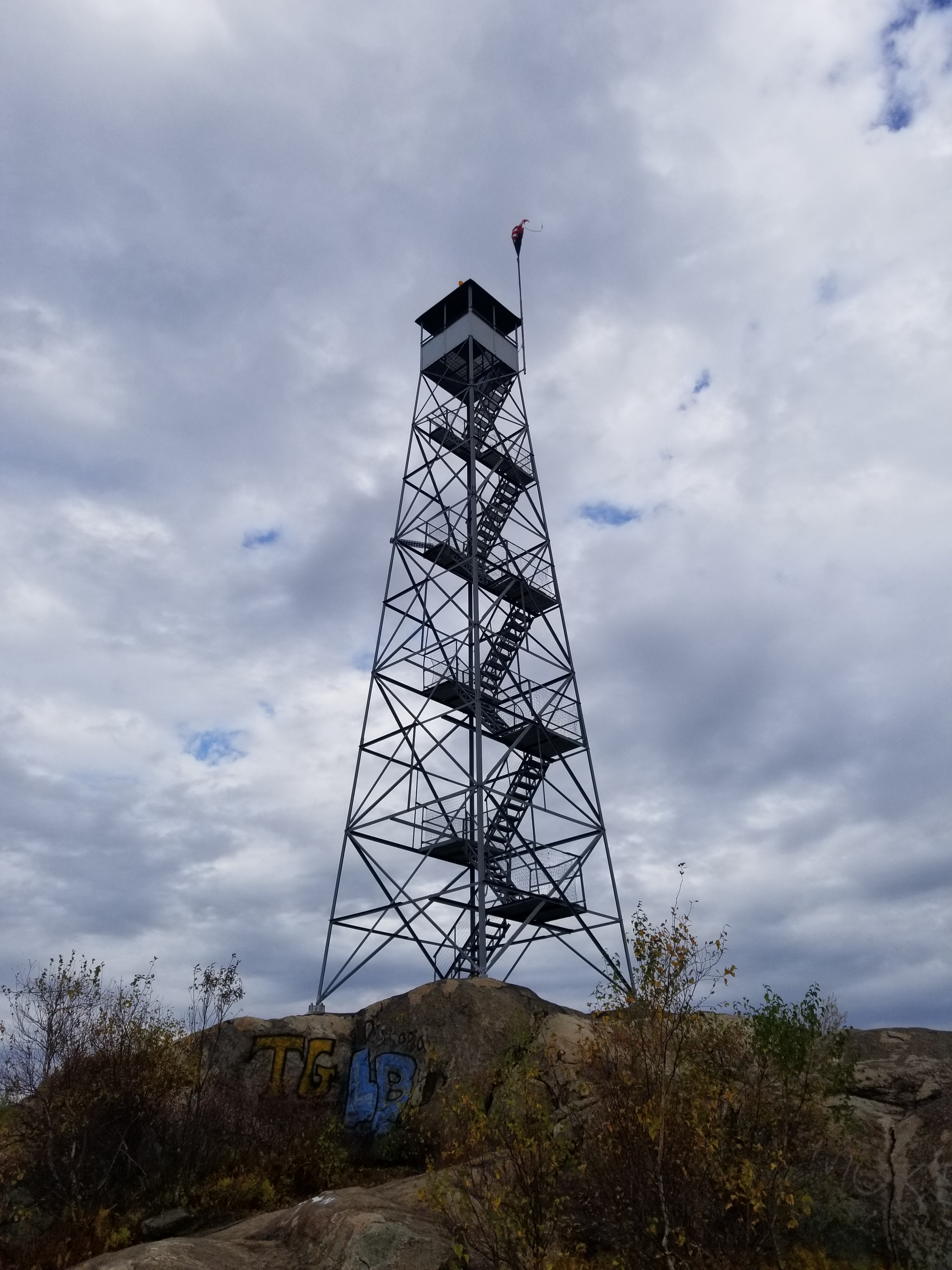

- Location within New York Location within the United States
- Location: South Beacon Mountain, Beacon, New York
- Coordinates: 41°28′53.34″N 73°56′39.5″W
- Architectural style: Aermotor Corporation
- MPS: Fire Observation Stations of New York State Forest Preserve MPS
- NRHP reference No.: 09000862
- Added to NRHP: October 23, 2009

The Mt. Beacon Fire Observation Tower is located on the summit of South Beacon Mountain in Beacon, New York, United States.

It was added to the National Register of Historic Places in 2009.

== See also ==
- National Register of Historic Places listings in Dutchess County, New York
