= Beacon Correctional Facility =

Former women's prison in Beacon, New York

Coordinates: 41°31′10″N 73°57′41″W

Beacon Correctional Facility was a female minimum security state prison, located in Beacon, New York, and operated by the New York State Department of Corrections and Community Supervision. .

Despite community opposition, Beacon Correctional Facility closed in September 2013 as a result of New York state budget cuts passed by the governor and the New York State Legislature. It was the state's only minimum security facility for women.
