= Beacon, New York =

- City
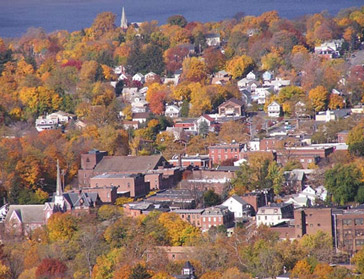
- Skyline of Beacon (2007)

- Flag Seal
- Nickname: Tree City
- Location of Beacon, New York

- Location within the state of New York Location within the United States Location within North America
- Coordinates: 41°30′15″N 73°57′56″W
- Country: United States
- State: New York
- County: Dutchess
- Established: 1913

Government
  - Type: Mayor-Council
  - Mayor: Lee Kyriacou (D)
  - City Administrator: Benjamin Swanson
  - City Council: Members' List: At-Large Members: • Amber Grant (D); • Paloma Wake (D); • W1: Lastar Gorton (D); • W2: Zack Smith (D); • W3: Sergei Krasikov (D); • W4: Carolyn Bennett Glauda (D)

Area
  - Total: 4.88 sq mi (12.63 km^{2})
  - Land: 4.74 sq mi (12.27 km^{2})
  - Water: 0.14 sq mi (0.35 km^{2})
- Elevation: 138 ft (42 m)

Population (2020)
  - Total: 13,769
  - Density: 2,905.5/sq mi (1,121.81/km^{2})
- Time zone: UTC-5 (EST)
  - Summer (DST): UTC-4 (EDT)
- ZIP code: 12508
- Area code: 845
- FIPS code: 36-05100
- GNIS feature ID: 0977521
- Website: beaconny.gov

Beacon is a city located on the Hudson River in Dutchess County, New York, United States. As of the 2020 census, the city's population was 13,769. Beacon is part of the Kiryas Joel–Poughkeepsie–Newburgh metropolitan area as well as the larger New York metropolitan area.

Beacon was so named to commemorate the historic beacon fires that blazed forth from the summit of the Fishkill Mountains to alert the Continental Army of British troop movements. Originally an industrial city along the Hudson, Beacon experienced a revival beginning in 2003 with the arrival of Dia Beacon, one of the largest modern art museums in the United States. Recent growth has generated debates on development and zoning issues.

The area known as Beacon was settled by Europeans as the villages of Matteawan and Fishkill Landing in 1709. They were among the first colonial communities in the county. Beacon is located in the southwestern corner of Dutchess County in the Mid-Hudson Region, approximately 90 miles (140 km) south of Albany, and approximately 60 miles (97 km) north of New York City.

== History ==
In 1683 Francis Rombout and Gulian Verplanck, merchant-fur traders from New York City, purchased the land that would come to include the City of Beacon from the Wappinger tribe. The sale was sanctioned by James II of England in 1685 in the Rombout Patent. Rombout died in 1691, leaving his share to his daughter, Catheryna Brett. The Rombout Patent was partitioned in 1706, and Brett received and maintained approximately 28,000 acres (110 km^{2}) along the Vis Kill.

Brett sold some of her land to other settlers, often retaining the right to build a flour mill on the property. During the first third of the nineteenth century, Dutchess County ranked first among New York State counties in wheat production. Mills on Brett's property attracted farmers from both sides of the river. In 1748 Brett and a group of other settlers agreed to build the Frankfort Store House near the water at the "Lower Landing" north of Dennings Point. This store marked the beginning of river freighting in the area, and Fishkill Landing developed into a river port. As early as 1780 two dozen vessels operated out of Fishkill Landing. John Peter DeWint, owner of 2,000 acres at Fishkill Landing, helped further raise its status as a port by building the Long Dock in 1815. The village of Fishkill Landing was incorporated in 1864.

Matteawan was situated on the Fishkill Creek about a mile and a half east of Fishkill Landing, and a like distance above the mouth of the creek, whose hydraulic properties contributed to its development as a manufacturing center. It lay at the foot of the Fishkill Mountains, and was a station on both the Newburgh, Dutchess & Connecticut, and the New York & New England Railroads, and was connected with the Fishkill Landing by stage, and rail.

The city served a variety of roles during the Revolutionary War. It manufactured war supplies, and served as a fort and signaling point. The city's name came from signal fires lit atop nearby Mount Beacon.

During the 1800s, the city became a factory town and was known as "The Hat Making Capital of the US" with nearly 50 hat factories operating at one time. The Matteawan Manufacturing Company was the first in the area devoted to hat production, employing 500 workers. Many others followed, including Dutchess Hat Works, which produced 450 dozen hats daily by 1900 and owned its own showroom in Manhattan.

Beacon incorporated as a city in 1913, combining the villages of Fishkill Landing and Matteawan as well as a small portion of the hamlet of Glenham from the town of Fishkill.

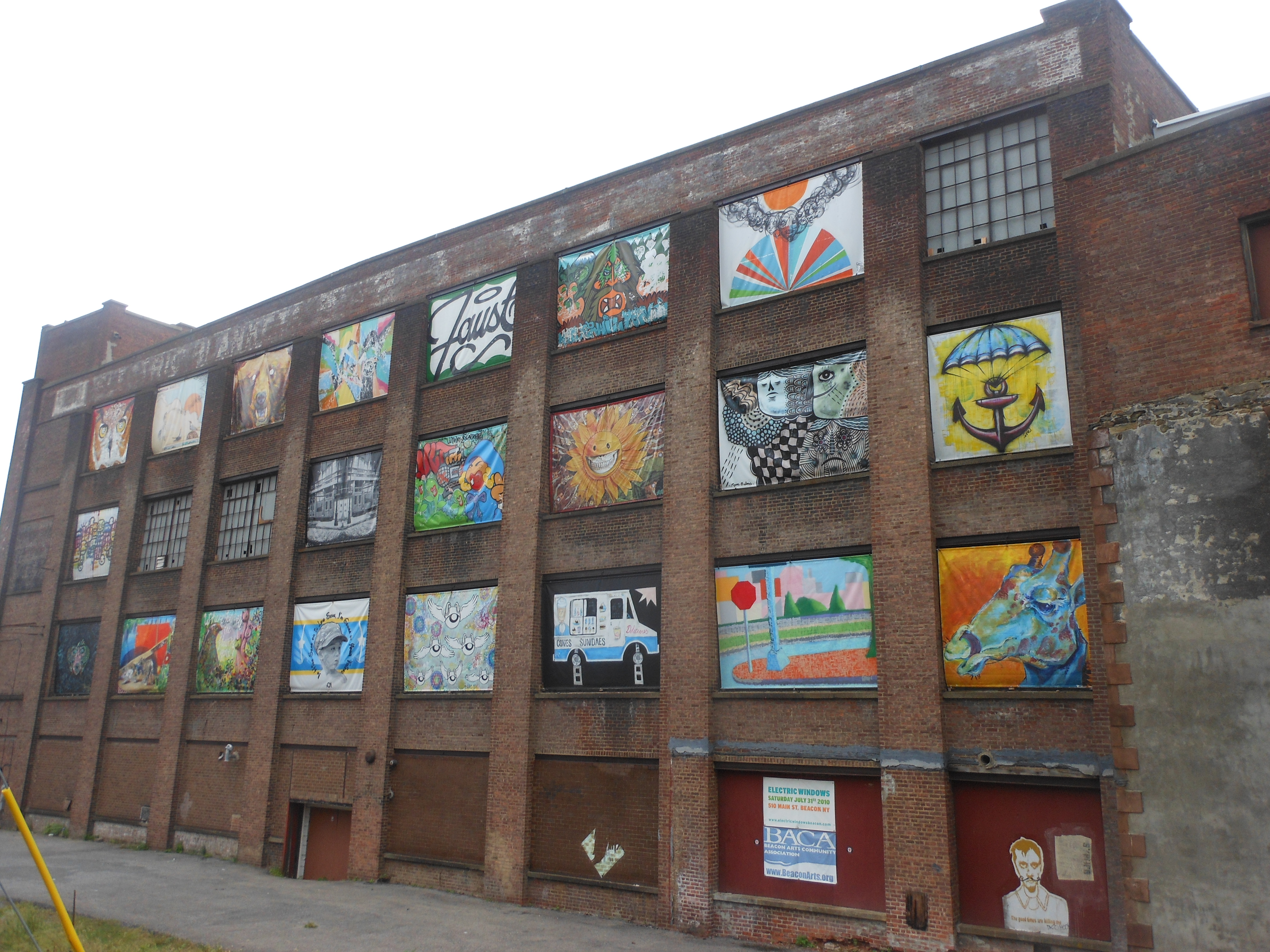
Empty buildings in Beacon, as seen in 2012, before later restoration.

During the 1960s, urban renewal led to the destruction of some significant historic buildings. In 1975, the Dutchess Ski area, which had been a large tourist attraction, was closed. Also in the 1970s, a decline in the economy shuttered most of Beacon's factories. This resulted in a severe and ongoing economic downturn that lasted from about 1970 to the late 1990s, during which almost 80 percent of the city's commercial business spaces and factories were vacant. Starting in the late 1990s, and with the opening of Dia Beacon, one of the world's largest contemporary art museums, in 2003, Beacon began an artistic and commercial rebirth. New development continues to enlarge the city.

== Geography ==
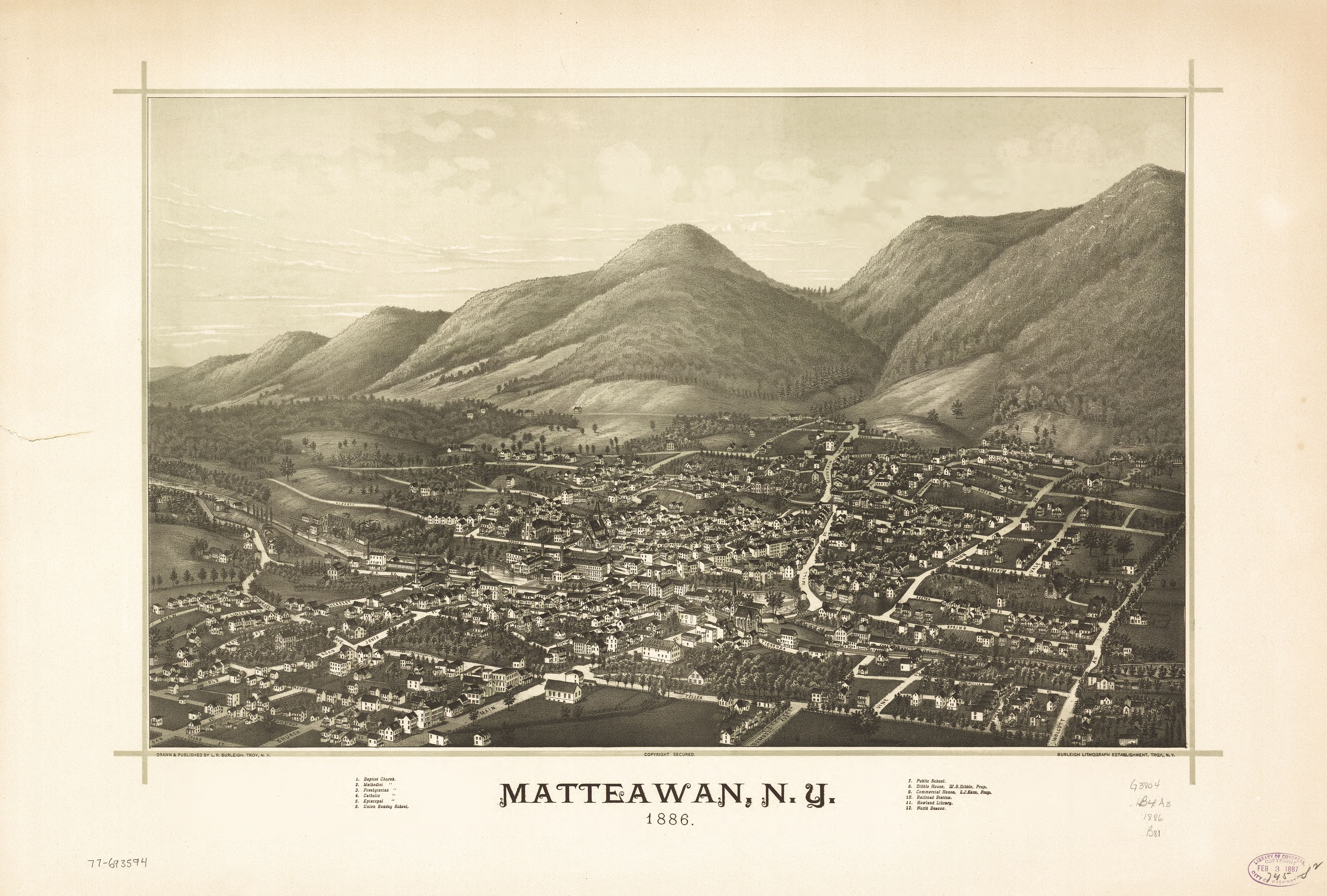
Perspective map of Matteawan and list of landmarks from 1886 by L.R. Burleigh

According to the United States Census Bureau, the city has a total area of 4.9 square miles (13 km^{2}), of which 4.8 square miles (12 km^{2}) is land and 0.1 square miles (0.26 km^{2}) is water. The total area is 2.25% water, which includes the Beacon Reservoir.

Located on the eastern shore of the Hudson River, Beacon is noted for its proximity to numerous historic sites and large cities. It is located minutes away from Bannerman's Castle and West Point. Beacon also sits with the famous Mount Beacon as its backdrop and the Hudson River as its front door. The city also is located across the river from its larger sister city, Newburgh. Beacon is just 20 minutes south of the Hudson Valley Region capital city, Poughkeepsie. Danbury, Connecticut, lies approximately 30 miles to the east, while New York City is 55 miles to the south.

=== Neighborhoods ===
The city includes the following neighborhoods:

Main neighborhoods

- Riverside section
- Mountainside section

Secondary neighborhoods

- North tree streets
- South tree streets
- Business district (Main Street area)—revitalized over the last decade with artists' studios, shops and restaurants
- "Davies" or "the apartments" (section of city with a concentrated area of public housing on South Avenue)
- "Forrestal Heights"—this also is partially populated by elderly fixed-income persons in the one high-rise building in the complex and welfare recipients in the two-story apartments in the surrounding neighborhood.
- "The Derk" (neighborhood east of Fishkill Creek along East Main; generally, the environs of Beacon Fire Station 1.)

=== Historic neighborhoods ===
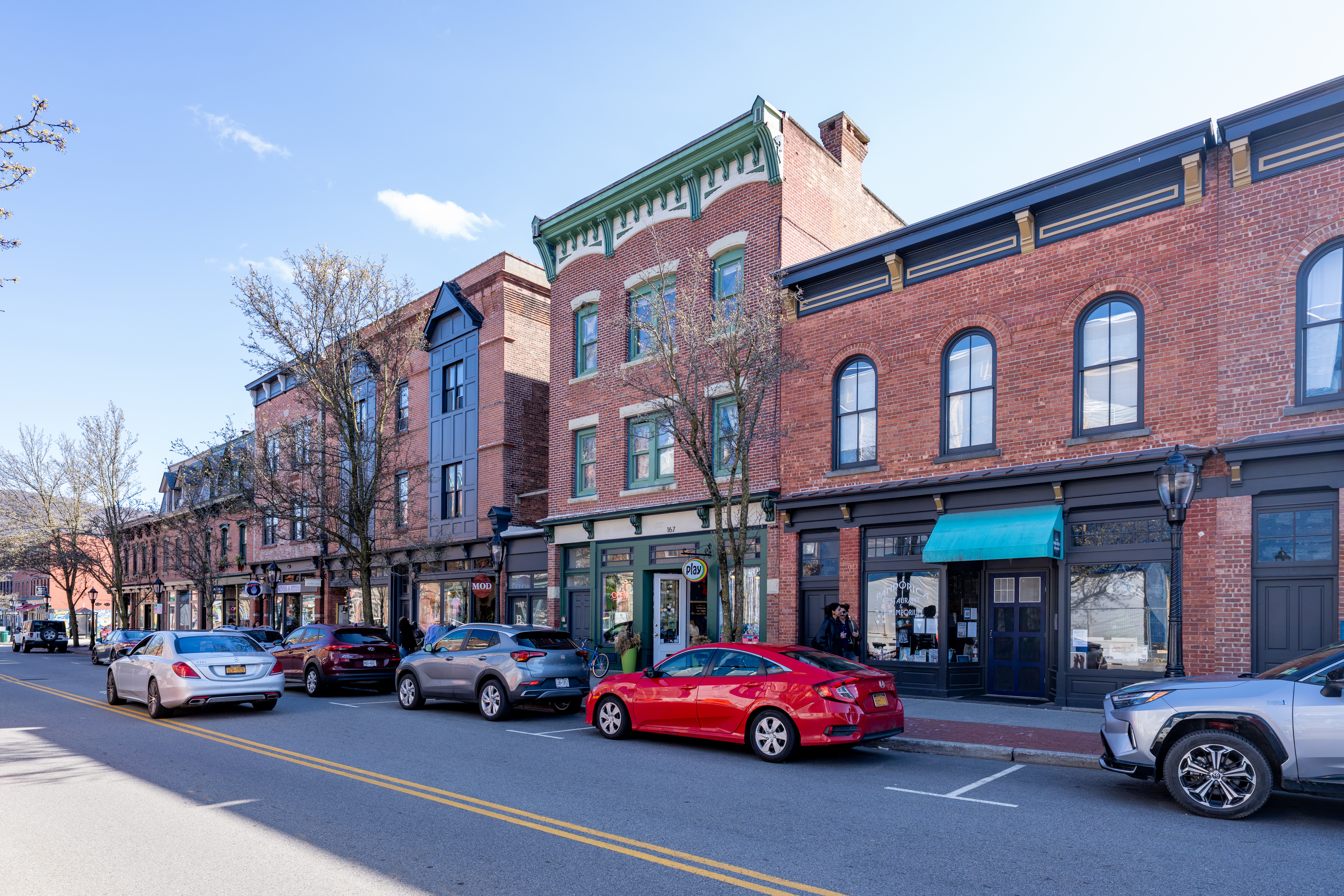
Lower Main Street Historic District (2026)

Byrnsville, or Tioronda, was a hamlet near the mouth of the Fishkill creek, about a mile south of Fishkill Landing, and contained the Tioronda Hat Works. In 1880 it had a population of two hundred and seventeen. The Hat Works occupied the site of an old cotton-mill at this place which failed before 1850. A grist and saw-mill were subsequently built on the site but torn down by Lewis Tompkins in 1878 when the Hat Works were erected. A little below these works is the former site of the Madam Brett grist-mill, for which this has been mistaken.

Groveville derives its name from the extensive oak grove which formerly occupied the site. There was a grist mill at Groveville from a very early day, owned about 1820 by Samuel Upton, a Quaker. who acquired it from Abraham Dubois. Upton also erected on the opposite side of the race a stone building which he used as a fulling mill. Sometime after 1840, the property, was sold it to the Glenham Co., who converted it to a woolen mill, and did carding, spinning and weaving.

The first several blocks of Main Street east of its junction with South Avenue constitutes the Lower Main Street Historic District and features many small businesses located in vintage Italianate-style buildings.

=== Historic places ===
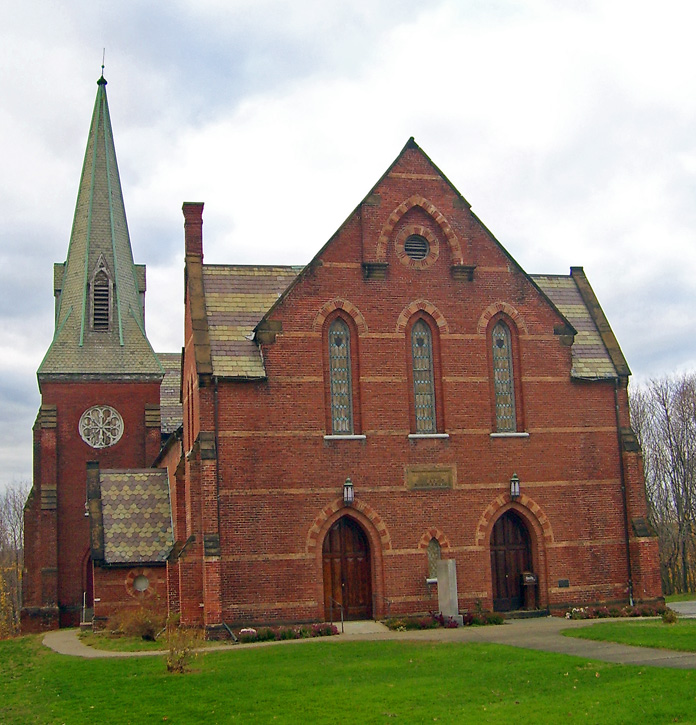
Reformed Church of Beacon, designed by Frederick Clarke Withers (2006)

- Bogardus-DeWindt House is located on Tompkins Avenue, a short distance west of NY 9D, in Beacon, New York, United States. It typifies the houses built in the region between 1750 and 1830. It was included on the National Register of Historic Places on April 19, 1993.
- Madam Brett Homestead, 50 Van Nydeck Avenue: the oldest building in Dutchess County, and is on the National Register of Historic Places.
- Denning's Point is a peninsula that extends into the Hudson River. It was known as "DePeyster's Point" until Adjutant-General William Denning purchased the land in 1785. The land has been the site of a brickyard and other industries. It is now the location of The Beacon Institute for Rivers and Estuaries. There is evidence that Alexander Hamilton lived on Denning's Point during the Revolutionary War and started crafting The Federalist Papers while living at this location.
- Eustatia is a brick cottage in the High Victorian Gothic style overlooking the Hudson River on Monell Place. It was built in 1867 to designs by Frederick Clarke Withers for his friend John J. Monell. Monell had recently married Caroline DeWindt Downing, widow of the influential Newburgh architect Andrew Jackson Downing, with whom Withers had worked. They built the house on property deeded to them by her father, John P. DeWindt. In 1979 it was added to the National Register of Historic Places.

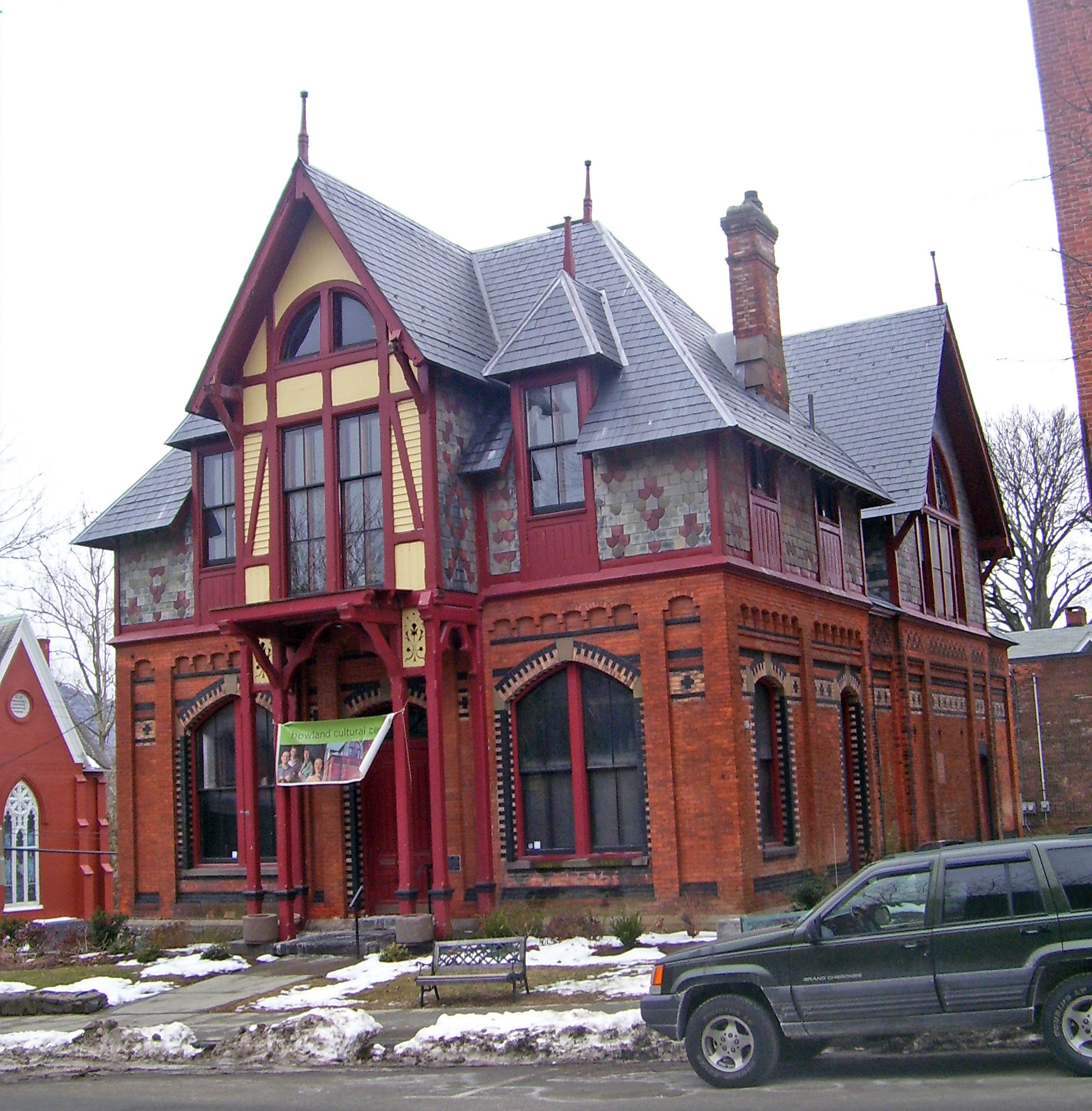
Howland Cultural Center (2009)

- The Howland Cultural Center, located on Main Street, is the former historic Howland Circulating Library. It was designed in 1872 by Richard Morris Hunt, brother-in-law of Eliza Howland and Joseph Howland. He was one of a committee of ten local benefactors who had joined to establish a library for their city, and commissioned Hunt for the job. When the library opened, its 2,200-volume collection was available only to subscribers. Later the library opened to the general public, but by 1976 the collection needed more space and so the library moved down Main Street. The old library building is now in the hands of a private non-profit organization, the Howland Cultural Center, which presents art exhibitions and other cultural activities. It was added to the National Register of Historic Places on May 5, 1973.

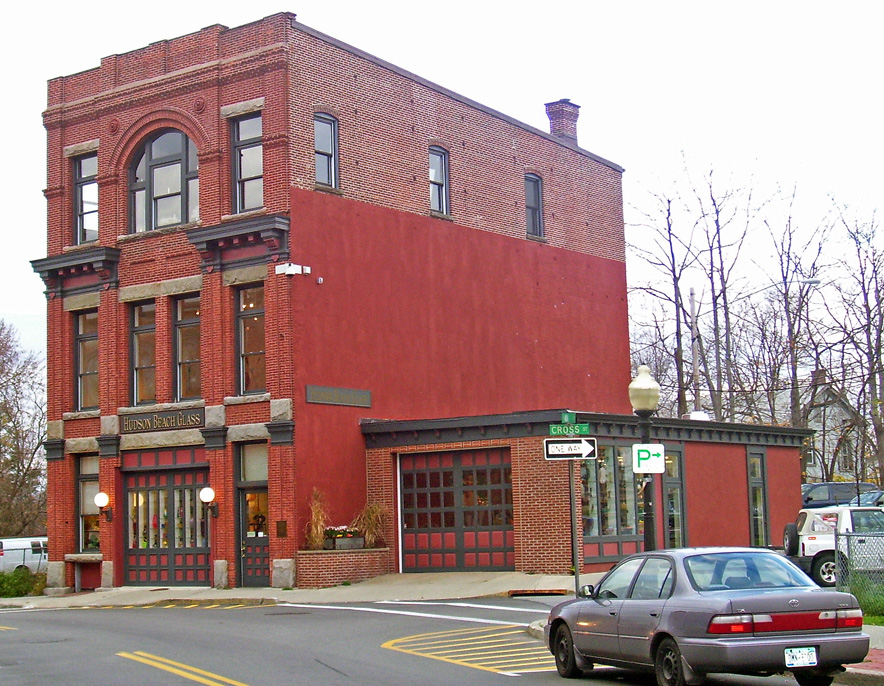
Lewis Tompkins Hose Company No. 1 Firehouse (2006)

- Lewis Tompkins Hose Company No. 1 Firehouse
- Mount Gulian
- Dia Beacon, the museum has a contemporary art collection of work dating from the 1960 to today and is housed in a former Nabisco box-printing factory.
- Peter C. DuBois House
- Reformed Church of Beacon, originally the Reformed Dutch Church of Fishkill Landing, is a congregation of the Reformed Church in America. The oldest church in Beacon, the congregation was established in 1813. It overlooks the Hudson River from the top of a bluff. The church and its cemetery were added to the National Register of Historic Places in 1988.
- St. Joachim and St. John the Evangelist's Church (Beacon, New York)
- St. Luke's Episcopal Church (Beacon, New York)
- Tioronda Bridge
- Trinity Methodist Church (Beacon, New York)

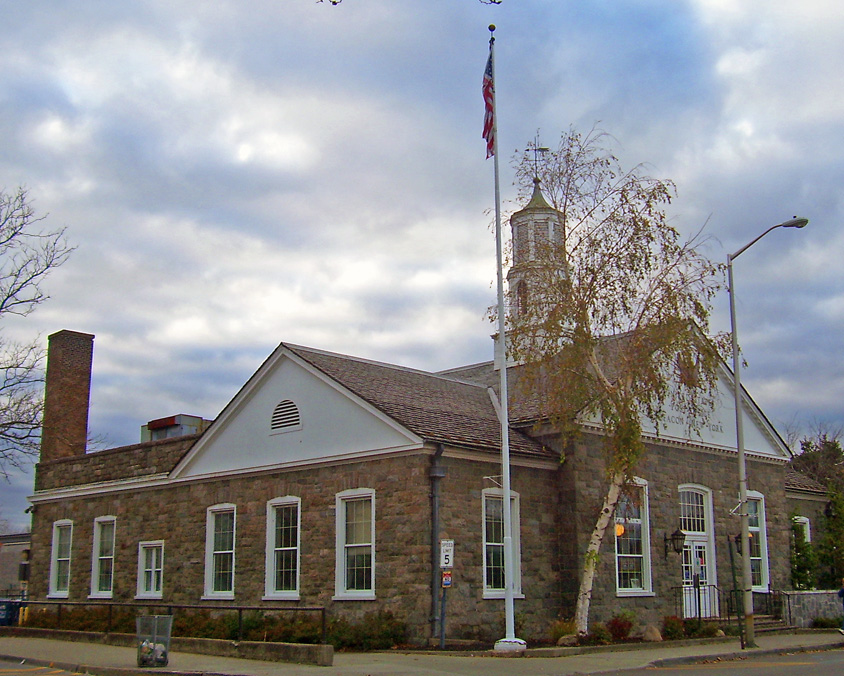
Beacon Post Office (2006)

- United States Post Office is located at 369 Main Street, Beacon NY. It is a stone structure in the Dutch Colonial Revival architectural style built in the mid-1930s. It includes an interior mural by Charles Rosen. In 1988 it was listed on the National Register of Historic Places along with many other older post offices in the state. The building's fieldstone exterior is a distinctive feature of New Deal era design.
- Beacon is home to one of a handful of operating "dummy lights" in the United States. The Beacon Dummy Light is located at the intersection of Main and East Main Streets. It is a traffic signal on a pedestal which sits in the middle of an intersection, first installed in 1926. It was recently restored in 2022. Two other dummy lights are located in New York State, at Canajoharie and Croton-on-Hudson.

== Demographics ==
Historical population
Census	Pop.	Note	%±
1920	10,996		—
1930	11,933		8.5%
1940	12,572		5.4%
1950	14,012		11.5%
1960	13,922		−0.6%
1970	13,255		−4.8%
1980	12,937		−2.4%
1990	13,243		2.4%
2000	13,808		4.3%
2010	15,541		12.6%
2020	13,769		−11.4%
U.S. Decennial Census

=== 2020 census ===
As of the 2020 census, Beacon had a population of 13,769. The median age was 41.5 years. 18.8% of residents were under the age of 18 and 16.6% of residents were 65 years of age or older. For every 100 females there were 89.5 males, and for every 100 females age 18 and over there were 87.8 males age 18 and over.

99.9% of residents lived in urban areas, while 0.1% lived in rural areas.

There were 5,780 households in Beacon, of which 24.8% had children under the age of 18 living in them. Of all households, 38.4% were married-couple households, 20.1% were households with a male householder and no spouse or partner present, and 32.8% were households with a female householder and no spouse or partner present. About 34.4% of all households were made up of individuals and 11.7% had someone living alone who was 65 years of age or older.

There were 6,262 housing units, of which 7.7% were vacant. The homeowner vacancy rate was 1.7% and the rental vacancy rate was 5.9%.

Racial composition as of the 2020 census
Race	Number	Percent
White	8,751	63.6%
Black or African American	1,933	14.0%
American Indian and Alaska Native	55	0.4%
Asian	296	2.1%
Native Hawaiian and Other Pacific Islander	11	0.1%
Some other race	1,131	8.2%
Two or more races	1,592	11.6%
Hispanic or Latino (of any race)	2,686	19.5%

=== 2010 census ===
The 2010 United States census listed the population at 15,541.

=== 2000 census ===
The census of 2000 placed the city's population at 13,808 people. The census also showed that the city has 5,091 households and 3,360 families residing in the city. The population density was 2,891.6 inhabitants per square mile (1,116.5/km^{2}), based on the census population of 13,808. There were 5,406 housing units at an average density of 1,132.1 per square mile (437.1/km^{2}). The racial makeup of the city was 9,440 or 68.37% White and 4,368 or 31.63% Minority. The minority population was dominated by African Americans at 2,713 residents or 19.65%, then followed by Hispanic or Latino which make up 2,334 residents or 16.90% of the city. Smaller minority groups include 956 residents or 6.92% from other races, 181 residents or 1.31% Asian, 43 residents or 0.31% Native American, and 0.00% Pacific Islander. Also, the city includes 475 residents or 3.44% identifying themselves as two or more races.

Based on census data showing 5,091 households, 34.7% had children under the age of 18 living with them, 44.6% were married couples living together, 16.9% had a female householder with no husband present, and 34.0% were non-families. 28.6% of all households were made up of individuals, and 10.4% had someone living alone who was 65 years of age or older. The average household size was 2.61 and the average family size was 3.23.

Of the city's total population, 27.1% were under the age of 18, 7.1% were between 18 and 24, 31.9% were between 25 and 44, 21.7% were between 45 and 64, and 12.2% were 65 years of age or older. The median age was 36 years. For every 100 females, there were 90.3 males. For every 100 females age 18 and over, there were 86.3 males.

The median income for a household in the city was $45,236, and the median income for a family was $53,811. Males had a median income of $40,949 versus $29,154 for females. The per capita income for the city was $20,654. 1,465 residents or 11% of the population and 310 families or 9.1% of the total number of families were living below the poverty line. Of the total population, 834 residents or 11% of those under the age of 18, and 99 residents or 8.6% of those 65 and older, were living below the poverty line. The city's housing stock was currently composed of 10% subsidized housing, of which about 400 units were state and federal housing projects.

== Government ==
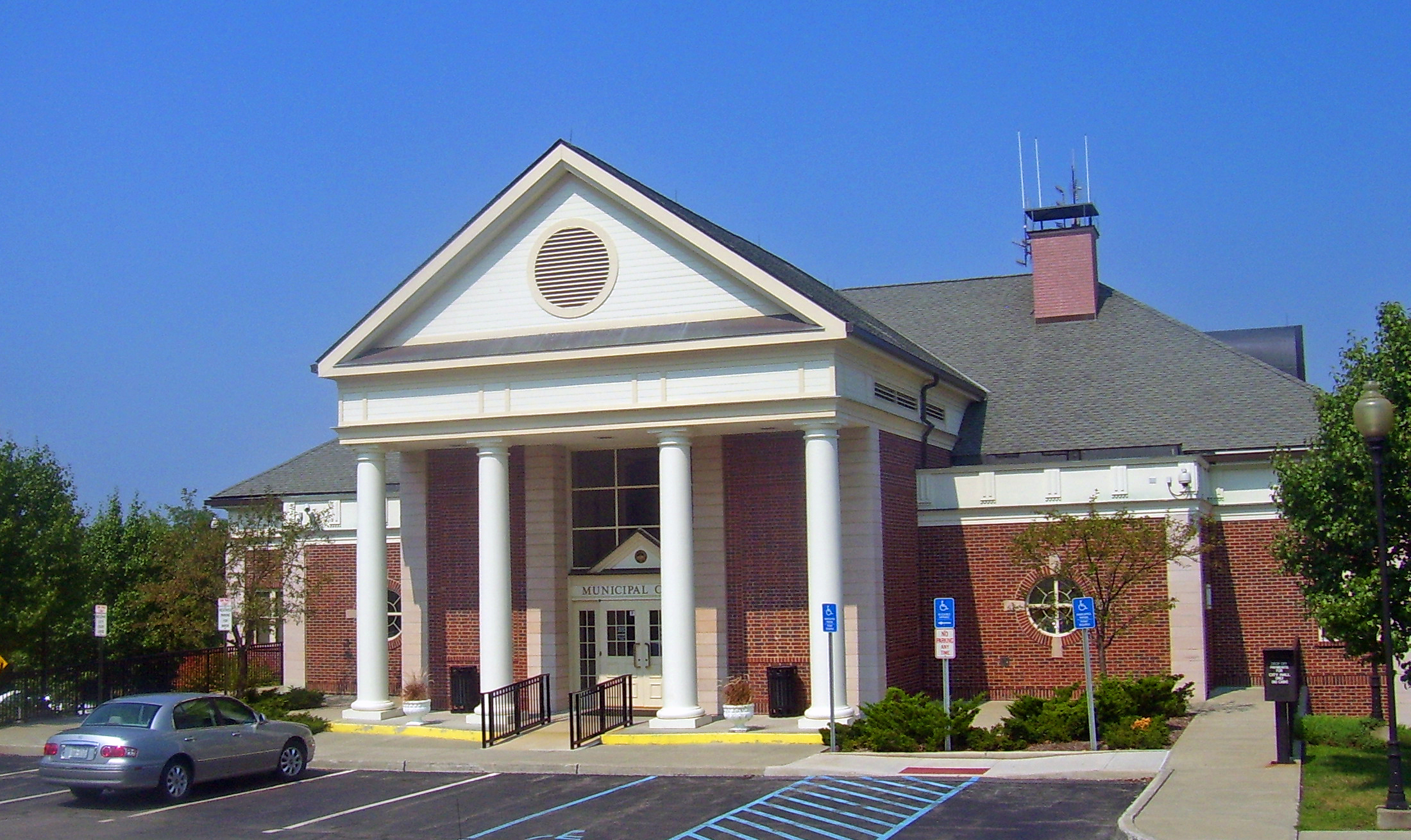
City Hall (2008)

=== Governing body ===
Beacon is governed via the mayor-council system. The mayor is elected in a citywide vote. The city council consists of six members. Two are elected at-large. The other four are elected from one of four wards. Additionally, the City Administrator serves at the pleasure of the Mayor and supervises the operations of all departments and units of the city government. The 'Government' section of the city's website includes information about current elected and appointed officials.

=== Schools ===
See: Beacon City Schools

=== Howland Public Library ===
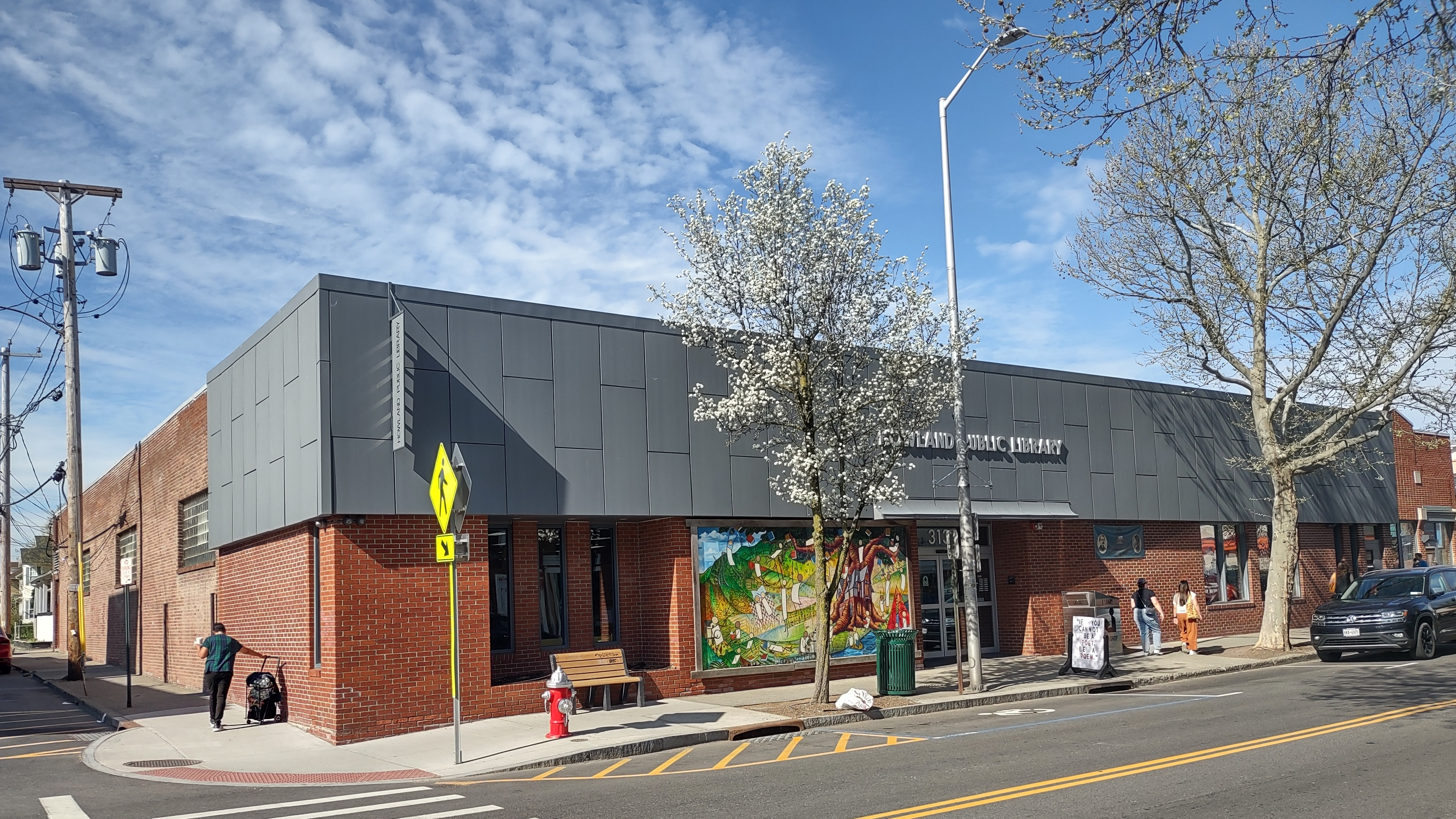
Howland Public Library (2023)

Founded in 1872 by General Joseph Howland and his spouse Eliza Howland, the Howland Public Library was originally housed in the Howland Cultural Center and is now located at 313 Main St. Beacon, NY 12508. In the 70s, the building was once the Fishman's Department Store. The interior includes the “Common Clay” relief sculpture mural, a community art project conceived by Mika Seeger; a colorful Main Street mural painted by Rick Price; and a South Cedar Street literary mural in memory of artist Audrey Chibbaro by Beacon High School art students. The Howland Public Library is a part of the Mid-Hudson Library System.

=== Emergency response ===
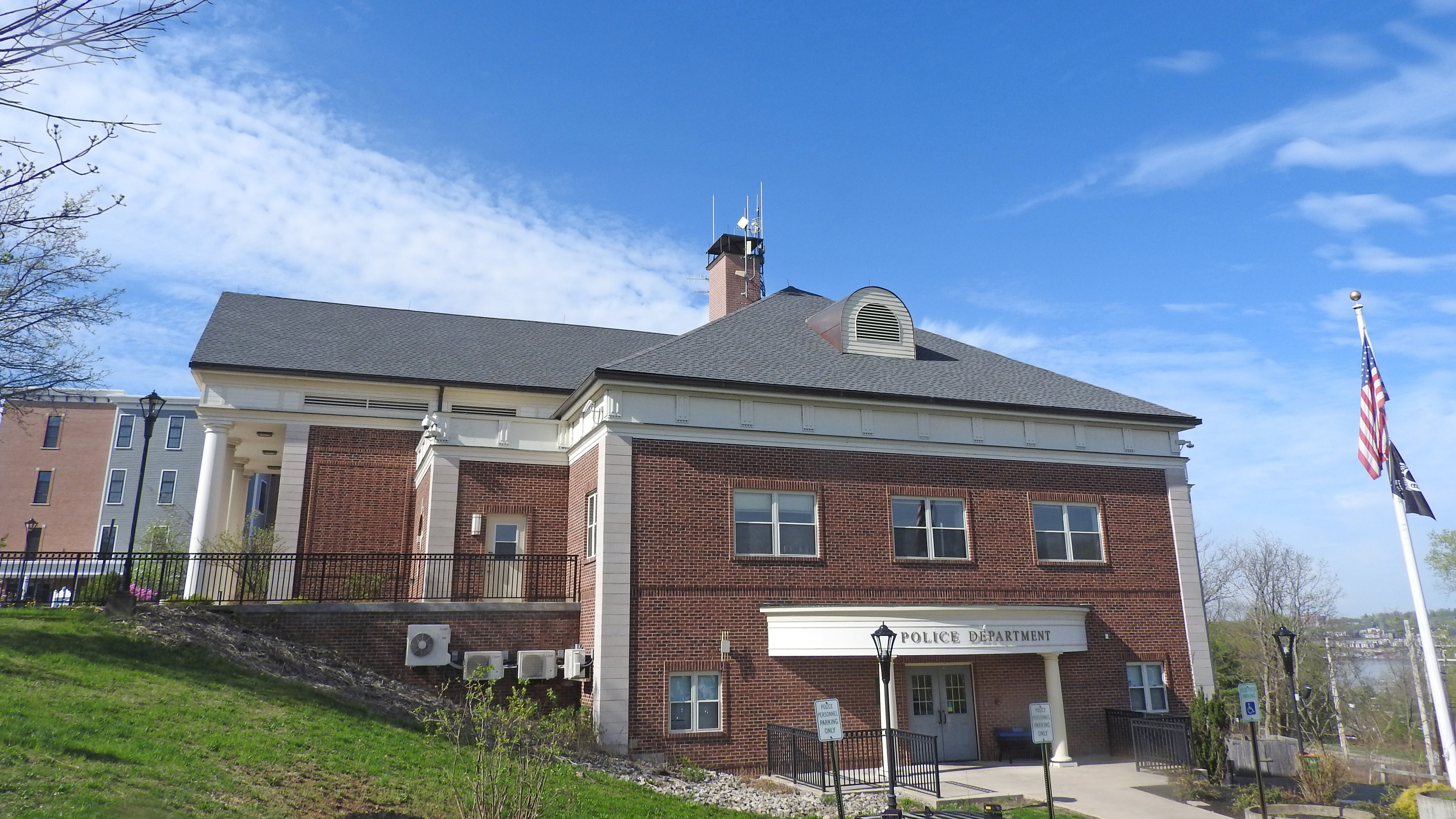
Police headquarters

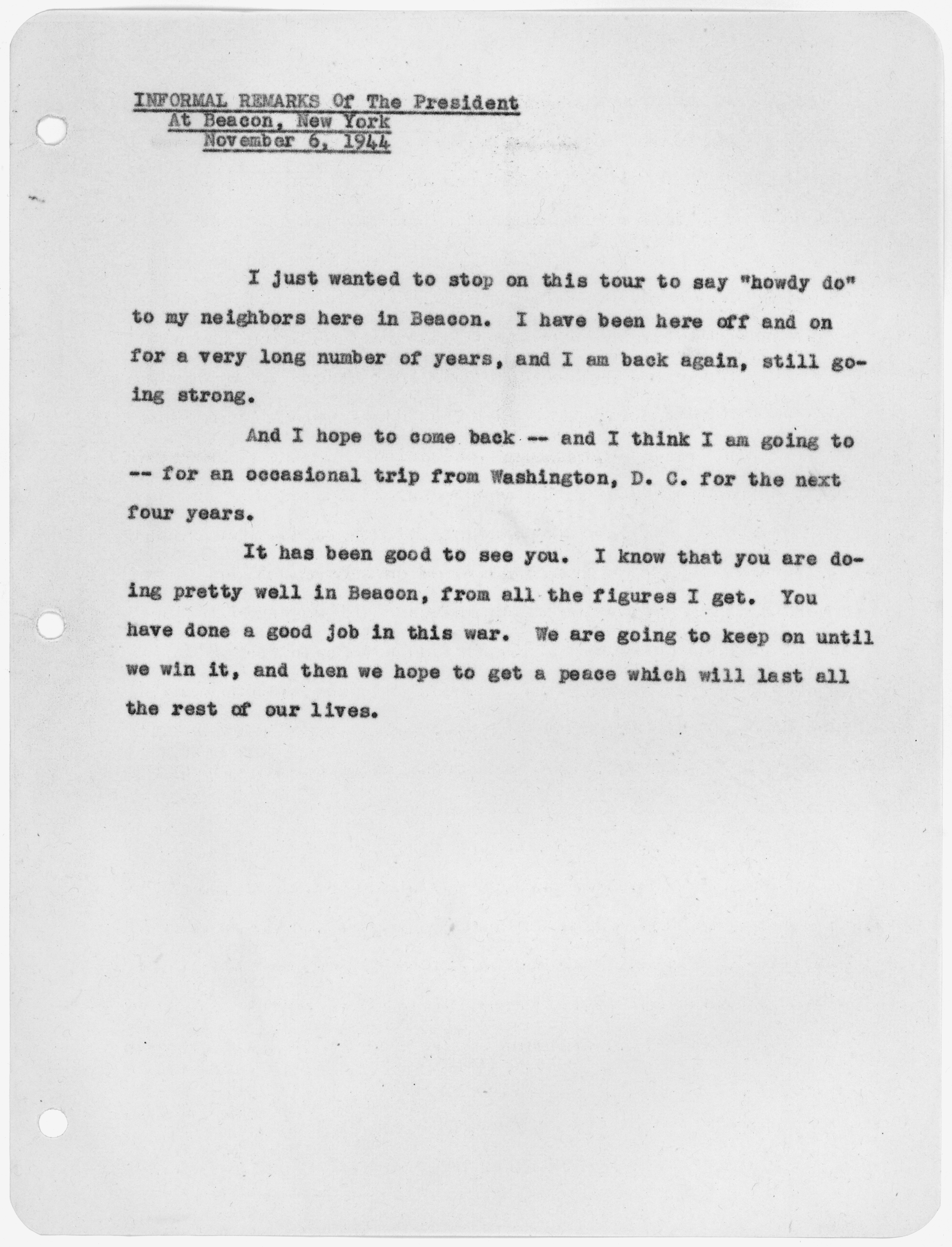
Remarks from 1944 FDR visit praising Beacon's participation in the War Effort

The City of Beacon participates in the Dutchess County Department of Emergency Response. All calls for police are routed to the City of Beacon Police who dispatch their vehicles to the call. All calls for fire or medical assistance are dispatched by the County Department of Emergency Response. The City of Beacon Fire Department is a combination Paid and Volunteer Department that provides fire suppression, rescue, and emergency medical first response for the city. Beacon Volunteer Ambulance Corps is a combination paid and volunteer agency that provides Basic Life Support and Mobile Life Support Services provide Advanced Life Support medical care within the city.

=== Prisons ===
==== Current ====
- Fishkill Correctional Facility

==== Former ====
- Beacon Correctional Facility
- Downstate Correctional Facility
- Matteawan State Hospital for the Criminally Insane (historic)

== Transportation ==
=== Public transportation ===
==== Train ====
===== Metro-North =====
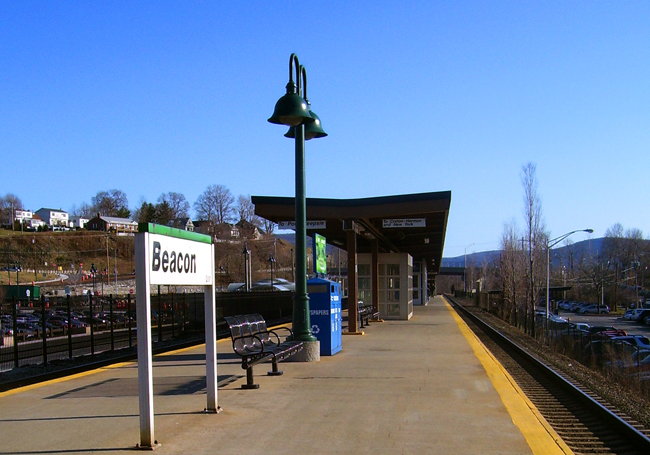
MTA Train Station at Beacon, New York (2006)

Commuter service to New York City is available via the Beacon Train Station on the Hudson Line, served by Metro-North Railroad.

===== Beacon Incline Railway =====
From 1902 to 1978, the Mount Beacon Incline Railway was one of the steepest incline railways in existence (a 74% grade). It took an estimated 3.5 million people up to the 1,540-foot (470 m) summit of Mount Beacon. Fire and vandalism destroyed the incline railway. From 1996 until 2022, the Mount Beacon Incline Railway Restoration Society worked to reopen the attraction, but ultimately could not raise enough funds for the project.

===== Electric Streetcar =====
Between August 27, 1892, and April 20, 1930, an electric streetcar system connected Beacon with the Village of Fishkill, NY.

==== Newburgh-Beacon Ferry ====
The Newburgh–Beacon Ferry was a ferry service crossing the Hudson River that used to connects Newburgh with Beacon, New York. This was replaced with a bus service in 2026.

==== Buses ====
Dutchess County Public Transit operates public bus service in and near Beacon on weekdays, Saturdays, and runs with limited schedules on Sunday. One line (Route A) travels from downtown Beacon northeast on NY 52 to Fishkill and north on U.S. Route 9 (US 9) through Wappingers Falls to South Hills Mall, Poughkeepsie Galleria and downtown Poughkeepsie. Another line (Route B) travels from Beacon north to Poughkeepsie along NY 9D and US 9. A third line (Route F) travels northeast from Beacon through Fishkill to Hopewell Junction.

===== Newburgh-Beacon Bridge Shuttle bus =====
Replaced the Newburgh-Beacon Ferry in January 2026. Shuttle runs from Newburgh to Beacon Metro North Station (with some stops at Stewart International Airport). Route stops are located in Downtown Newburgh and the Route 17k Park & Ride.

===== Beacon Free Loop =====
Beacon also provides the Beacon FREE Loop, a free bus service that runs Monday-Saturday, 6am-9pm. The bus makes stops at the Beacon Metro-North Station, Dia Beacon, Main Street, the Mt. Beacon parking lot, and other points along its route. The Free Loop was created in collaboration with Beacon Arts, Dutchess County Public Transit, North Road Communications and the City of Beacon. In 2018 Dutchess County rebranded the Beacon G Route that was started in 2013 as the Beacon Free Loop.

=== Bicycle infrastructure ===
The city does not have dedicated bike lanes. In 2022, the Main Street Access Committee recommended that bicycle infrastructure would be best developed adjacent to Main Street, due to the narrow width of the street. In October 2022, the Beacon City Council requested that Dutchess County study how to integrate a rail trail along the dormant Beacon railroad line into its long-term planning.

=== Roads ===
Beacon's most major route is Interstate 84 (I-84), which passes through the city's north side, providing a connection that is minutes to the Taconic State Parkway, New York State Thruway, and Stewart International Airport. The city also has the Newburgh-Beacon Bridge which carries the Interstate Highway over the Hudson River.

New York State Route 9D (NY 9D) serves as the city's north–south arterial. It starts at the city's north side and wraps around the city to its south side. The city also has NY 52 Business, which begins in the city's west side at NY 9D and runs across the middle of the city to I-84 east of the city limits.

=== Airports ===
In the nearby Town of Wappinger, the Dutchess County Airport services local commuter flights. The nearest major airport to Beacon is Stewart International Airport about 20 minutes away, in Newburgh.

== Community groups ==
=== Beacon Sloop Club ===
Beacon Sloop Club started in 1978 with the launching of the Sloop Woody Guthrie, which was commissioned to be built by Cyrus Hamlin, by Pete Seeger and Toshi Seeger. Hamlin had previously built the Hudson River Sloop Clearwater for the Hudson River Sloop Restoration in 1969. The purpose of the club is "to promote and encourage interest in sound ecological practices affecting the Hudson River and its environs;" "to organize and arrange associated recreational activities such as picnics, crafts, festivals and other community gatherings on the waterfront of Beacon, New York;" and "to promote interest in sailing and foster good fellowship and safety in boating: to encourage the sport of boating: to promote the science of seamanship and navigation, and provide access to information and training in the skills and techniques thereof: and to provide and maintain a suitable clubhouse and anchorage for the use and recreation of its members." Each year the Beacon Sloop Club hosts the Strawberry Festival, the Corn Festival, and the Pumpkin Festival to help raise money for community activities and to raise awareness for social or environmental issues.

=== Beacon Climate Action Now (BCAN) ===
Beacon Climate Action Now (BCAN) is a community activism group focused on climate justice and the related crisis of care. BCAN is active in Beacon, NY and has members from the surrounding Hudson Valley.

==== Campaigns ====
BCAN's first campaign focused on banning natural gas in new constructions in Beacon, NY. BCAN crafted this campaign in the fall of 2022 and organized action through canvassing, public events, educational outreach, partnership with local environmental advocacy groups, and civic engagement with Beacon City Council. On March 20, 2023, the Beacon City Council unanimously voted in favor of passing Local Law No. 1 of 2023, to require the Electrification of Residential and Commercial Buildings, effective January 1, 2024. With passing this local law, Beacon became the third municipality in New York State to ban fossil fuels in new buildings, and the first in the Hudson Valley.

== Media ==
Beacon is served by two weekly newspapers: The Highlands Current, founded in 2010 and published on Friday, and the Beacon Free Press, published on Wednesdays. A daily paper, The Beacon Evening News, was published in the city from 1961 to 1990. The AM station WBNR is based in Beacon.

== Attractions ==
=== Museums and institutes ===
- Dia Beacon: a contemporary arts museum.
- The Beacon Institute of Rivers and Estuaries: a major river and estuary research institute.

=== Parks and recreation ===
- Bannerman Castle Trust: in connection with the Beacon Historical Society.
- Forrestal Park: connected to Forrestal Elementary on Liberty Street this large playground with a basketball court is a longtime favorite with locals. (in city)
- Green Street Park: neighborhood park located in the Mountain Side Section of the city (in city)
- Hammond Field: neighborhood park located in the River Side Section of the City that is primarily used for the city school district functions. Is the home of the "Beacon Bulldogs" Track and Football venues. (in city)
- Greenway Trail: public trail that provides non-contiguous trail access to Fishkill Creek. Continued development of trail sections is required by Beacon City Code, and included in the Fishkill Creek Greenway and Heritage Trail Master Plan.
- Hudson Highlands State Park: state park located behind and just south of the city. A very large state park that covers Mount Beacon. (1–3 minutes east and south of city)
- Long Dock Park
- Memorial Park: located in the center of the city and serves as the city's "Central Park". It is the city's primary park and many civic events are hosted there. (in city)
- Mt. Beacon Park: the hiking trails in and around what was the historic Mount Beacon Incline Railway, and includes access to the Mt. Beacon Fire Observation Tower.
- Hudson Highlands Fjord Trail, a planned 7.5-mile (12.1 km) foot and bicycle path to connect downtown Beacon and Cold Spring so hikers coming from New York City by train can more safely reach trailheads for Hudson Highlands State Park and take in the river shore.
- The Pete and Toshi Seeger Riverfront Park: The city's riverfront park, which is located on a peninsula jutting out into the Hudson River. A very active park that hosts numerous events. It was renamed in 2014. (in city)
- River Pool at Beacon: a project for cleaning up the Hudson River and allowing a safe place to swim.
- South Ave Park: housing project park for the Forrestal Heights Houses. Primarily used for the Beacon Hoops program, a city youth basketball program. (in city)
- University Settlement Park: owned by the city and operated by the Department of Parks and Recreation. It includes a theater space that is available for rental. It is also home to the Beacon Glades Disc Golf Course and The Beacon Pool, an outdoor pool that is 140 feet by 50 feet and is open to the community in the summer. (in city)

=== Commercial spaces ===
- Beacon Theatre (Beacon, New York)
- Towne Crier Cafe

== Sports ==
=== Professional sports ===
- Hudson Valley Renegades: Class A Minor League Baseball Team for the New York Yankees. The team plays home games in Dutchess Stadium located in neighboring Fishkill (3–5 minutes north of city). The team, formerly a member of the New York–Penn League, joined the reorganized South Atlantic League in 2021.
- Hudson Valley Hawks: semi-professional basketball of the National Professional Basketball League. Played their games at Beacon High School.
- The Hudson Valley Bears were one of four founding members of the Eastern Professional Hockey League (2008–09). They played their home games at the Mid-Hudson Civic Center in nearby Poughkeepsie.
- The Hudson Valley Highlanders of the North American Football League played their home games at Dietz Stadium in nearby Kingston.

=== Amateur sports ===
An amateur rugby club, The Hudson Valley Rebels, are composed of a Women's Rugby team (formed in 2005), and a Men's team (started in 2002). A disc golf ("frisbee golf") course was constructed in the woods and fields of the University Settlement camp in 2011. This 18-hole course, "Beacon Glades", is free and open to the public. Stroke-play tournaments are occasionally held.

Beacon High School has a Fitness Center and 25-yard swimming pool run by the Athletic Department that is open to the public for membership.

== Notable people ==
=== Natives ===
- Nick Acquaviva, American composer, pianist, and band leader; brother of Tony Acquaviva.
- Tony Acquaviva, was an American composer, conductor, string instrumentalist, and the founder of the New York Pops Symphony Orchestra. A graduate of the United States Military Academy at West Point, he married singer Joni James in 1956 at St. Patrick's Cathedral in New York City. His father, Mike Acquaviva, ran a barber shop on Main Street for many years.
- Melio Bettina, boxer, World Light Heavyweight Champion in 1939. A small street in the city's center is named in his honor.
- Wallace E. Conkling (1896–1979), seventh bishop of the Episcopal Diocese of Chicago, was born and raised in Matteawan (now part of Beacon).
- James Forrestal, Secretary of the Navy from 1944 to 1947 and Secretary of Defense, 1947–1949. One of the city's four elementary schools and one of its federal housing projects are named in his honor.
- Elijah Hughes, professional basketball player
- Paul Lavalle, conductor, composer, arranger and performer. Notable for his contribution to numerous radio shows throughout the 1940s, he was selected to be the conductor for the famous Band of America in 1948. In the 1960s, he was instrumental in forming what became the 100-member McDonald's All-American High School Band which participated in the Macy's Thanksgiving Day Parade and Tournament of Roses Parade.
- Robert Montgomery, actor and director who served as head of the Screen Actors Guild in 1935 and 1946, born in Fishkill Landing (now Beacon). He was also a Lieutenant Commander in the US Navy during World War II and father of actress Elizabeth Montgomery (star of Bewitched).
- Digger Phelps, head basketball coach at Notre Dame (1972–91), won more games (393) than any coach in school history; later a television commentator. For a time early in his career, he coached junior varsity basketball in Beacon. A small street off west Main Street is named in his honor.
- Ann E. Rondeau, retired US Navy Vice Admiral, served as the president, National Defense University (NDU), which is the premier center for Joint Professional Military Education and is under the direction of the chairman, Joint Chiefs of Staff.
- Louis W. Stotesbury, US Army brigadier general
- Lenny Torres, baseball player

=== Residents ===
- Joseph Bertolozzi, composer, musician, and creator of the Bridge Music and Tower Music projects, is a resident of Beacon.
- Mel Birnkrant, toy designer and collector known for his extensive collection of Mickey Mouse and other toys of pre-World War II comics characters. He was the creator of numerous toys such as Weenies, the Outer Space Men, the Magic Diaper Babies, Baby Face and the Trash Bag Bunch. He was also the Creative Director of Colorforms for over two decades.
- Frances Hodgson Burnett, English author, spent time in then-Fishkill Landing while recovering from a mental condition.
- Richard Butler, painter, musician, lead singer of The Psychedelic Furs.
- Ron English, an American contemporary artist who explores brand imagery, street art and advertising.
- William Few, a Founding Father of the United States
- Hampton Fluker, actor
- Eliza Howland, American author.
- Joseph Howland, civil war general and philanthropist. He is the namesake of the Howland Cultural Center and the city's public library.
- Bruce Molsky, old-time fiddler, guitarist, and singer
- David Rees, cartoonist and humorist
- Henry Winthrop Sargent, horticulturist and landscape gardener.
- Pete Seeger, folk singer and activist
- Toshi Seeger, environmental activist and filmmaker
- Frances Ford Seymour, mother of actors Jane Fonda and Peter Fonda, was a patient at Craig House in Beacon when she committed suicide in 1950.
- Clifford Shull, Nobel Prize-winning physicist
- Doug and Mike Starn, American artists
- Elmer Steele, Major League Baseball pitcher who played for Boston, Pittsburgh, and Brooklyn from 1907 to 1911

== In popular culture ==
Major motion pictures:

- Drowning Mona: The movie's production studio, Code Entertainment, claims that the movie was based and partially filmed in the city during its 1999 filming. The movie was based in the city and scenes were shot in the city.
- Super Troopers: Film was based in the city and the "Town Cop" scenes as well as most of the inside scenes were filmed in the city in 1999. Started out as an underground film and then became a very popular "teen comedy" movie.
- Nobody's Fool: Filmed largely in the home of the Schneider family. Many other scenes were filmed in the city in 1994, most notably three or four scenes that showed Main Street's "Main St., USA" appeal. The movie featured an all-star cast with Paul Newman, Bruce Willis, Melanie Griffith and Philiip Semour Hoffman. It was Jessica Tandy's last film.
- A Quiet Place (2018): A scene from the movie was filmed at Beacon Natural Market.
- The Killer (2023): A scene from the movie was filmed at Beacon Waterfront.

Television:

- People of Earth: The TBS show starring Wyatt Cenac is largely set in Beacon.
- Severance: Portions of this television series, set in the fictional town of Kier, were filmed in Beacon.

Other: The USS Beacon (PG-99), an Asheville-class gunboat in the United States Navy during the Vietnam War, was named after Beacon.

== See also ==
- List of cities in New York
