= Mount Beacon Incline Railway =

- U.S. National Register of Historic Places
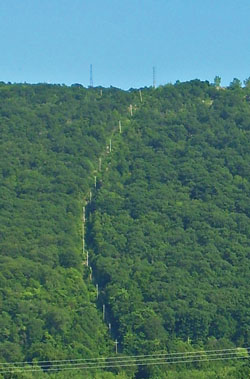
- Incline railway route seen from Beacon in 2006
- Location: Beacon / Town of Fishkill, New York, USA
- Coordinates: 41°29′27″N 73°57′20″W
- Built: 1902
- MPS: Hudson Highlands MRA
- NRHP reference No.: 82001151
- Added to NRHP: 1982

The Mount Beacon Incline Railway was a narrow gauge incline railway up Beacon Mountain near Beacon, New York. A popular local tourist attraction, it operated for much of the 20th century, providing sweeping views of the Hudson River Valley. Efforts to restore it have been discontinued.

The Otis Elevator Company and Mohawk Construction opened the 2,200' 3 ft (914 mm) gauge railway on Memorial Day, 1902. Sixty thousand fares were sold in its first year; two decades later that had almost doubled. Riders were often day visitors from New York City who came up the Hudson River by steamboat to Newburgh and then took the Newburgh-Beacon Ferry across the river. After a trolley trip to the base station on Wolcott Avenue (today NY 9D), the railway would take them up to the 1,540-foot (469 m) northern summit via an average gradient of 65% (33°) and a maximum gradient of 74% (36.5°), the steepest in existence while the railroad operated.

As was the case of so many other period incline railways, the Beacon funicular was in reality a means to a larger end. The 75-mile (121 km) panoramic views from the summit of Beacon Mountain and natural setting would be the lures to get tourists to the doorstep of several profitable attractions the railway's backers built atop the mountain, including the Beaconcrest Hotel, a Casino, and a private cottage community following land sales. The hotel and casino were in place by 1926, which proved a banner year, with 110,000 passengers riding to the top. Tragedy struck the next year, with fire consuming both the hotel and casino. Though they were rebuilt within a year, this proved the turning point in the rail's history, with the tourism-dampening Great Depression and World War II to follow.

Thanks to the automobile replacing historic mass transit to the area - which had brought passengers en masse up the river in excursion boats, via the railroad, and thence trolley right to the base of the lift - recreational patterns changed and the Beacon attraction never regained its popularity. Financial problems and more fires plagued the concern, which was unable to maintain necessary maintenance on either the railway or the summit attractions.

In 1978 the railway ceased operations. In 1982 it was added to the National Register of Historic Places. A fire attributed to vandalism the next year completely destroyed the trackway and consumed the lower station, following which the only remaining structure at the top, the powerhouse, was razed. The route still remains and is visible from much of the city. A 501(c)(3) non-profit, the Mount Beacon Incline Railway Restoration Society, worked from 1996-2022 to restore the attraction, but disbanded without accomplishing its mission.

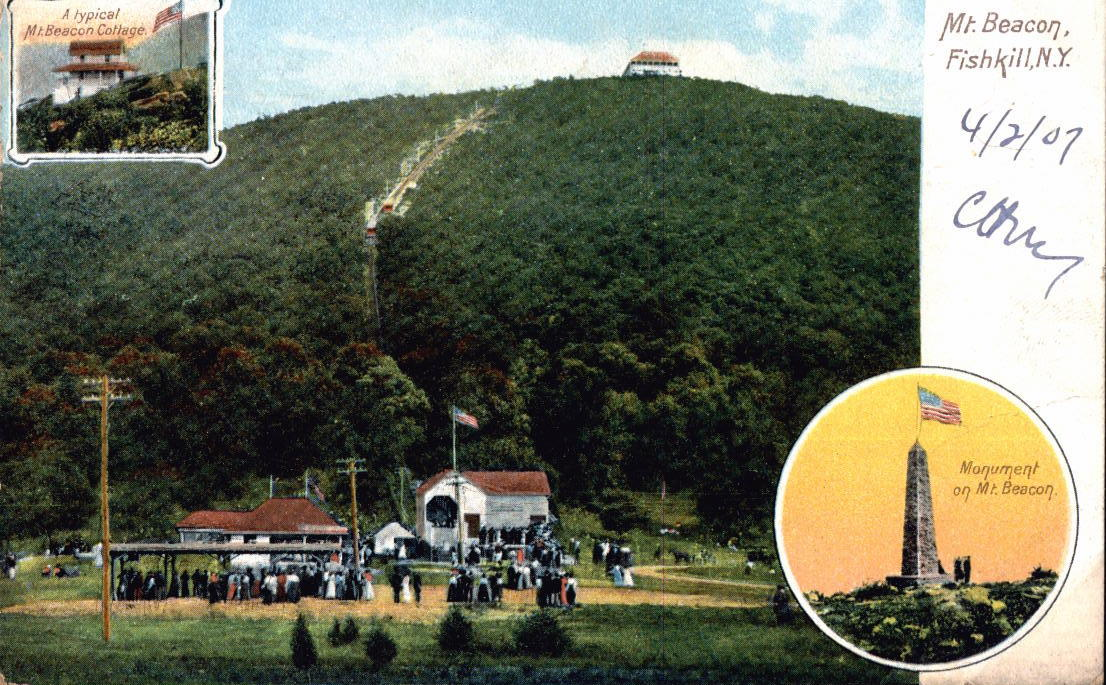
From a 1907 post card

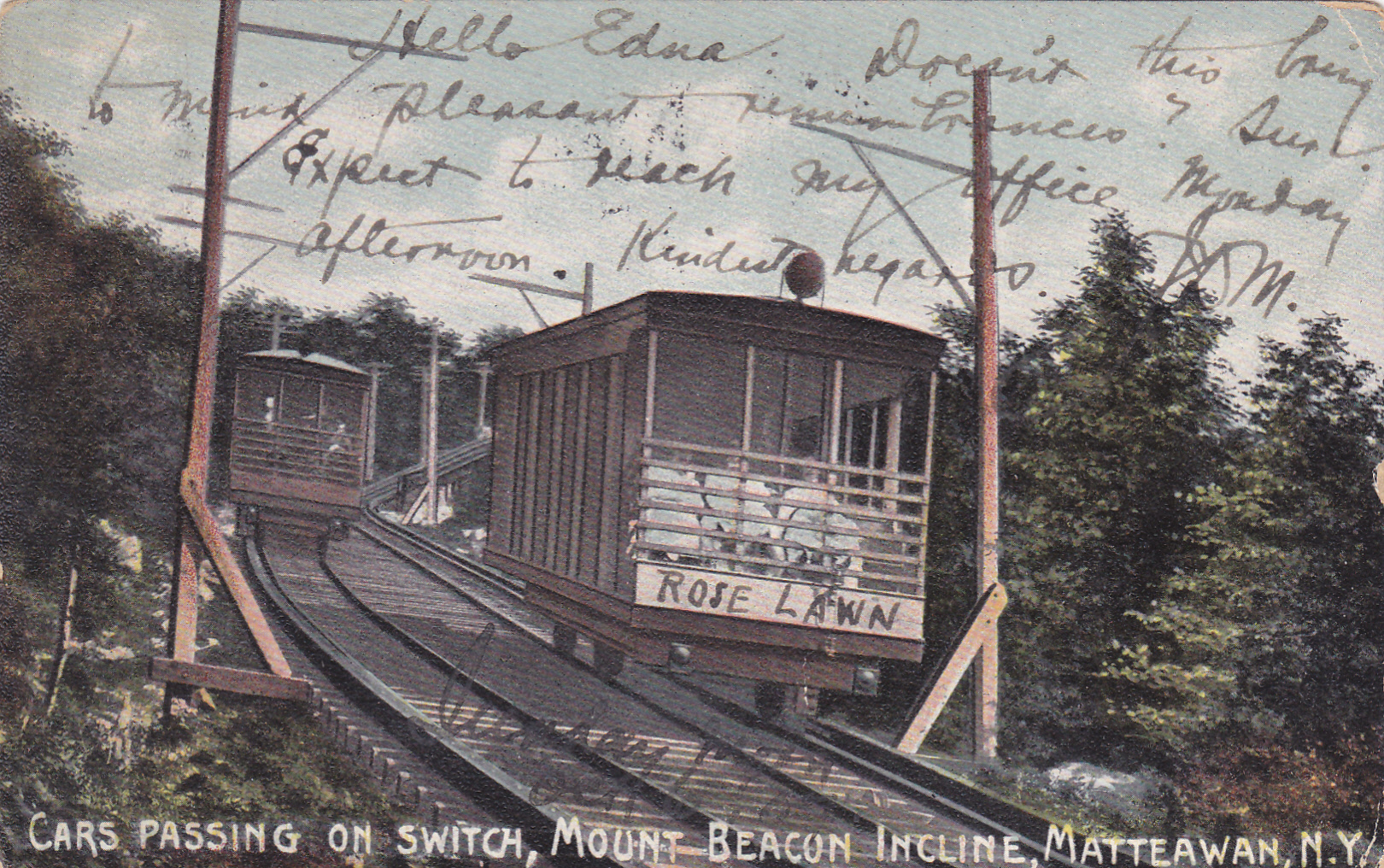
The railway's two cars passing each other in this circa 1905 postcard

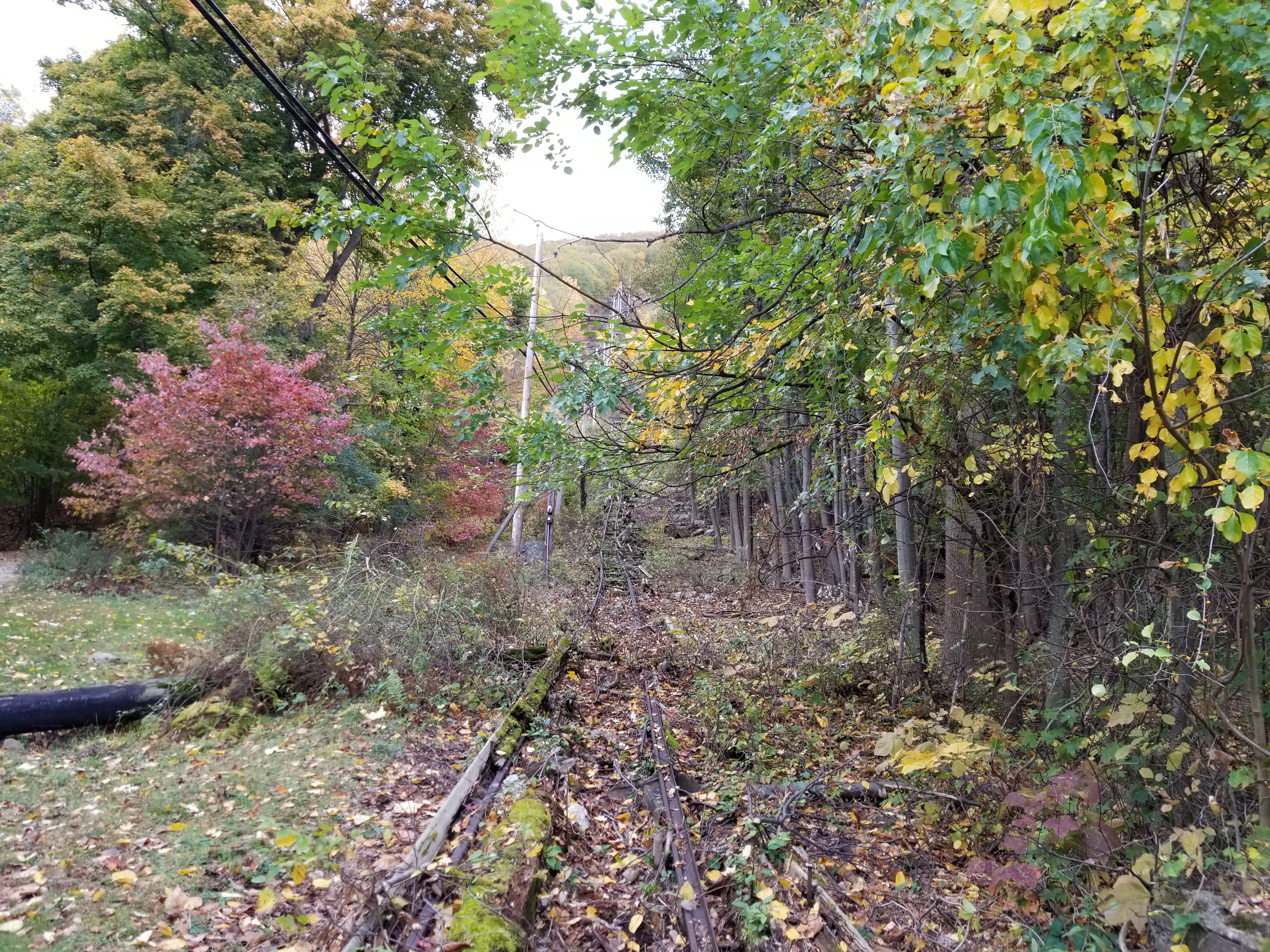
Derelict track at the former lower station

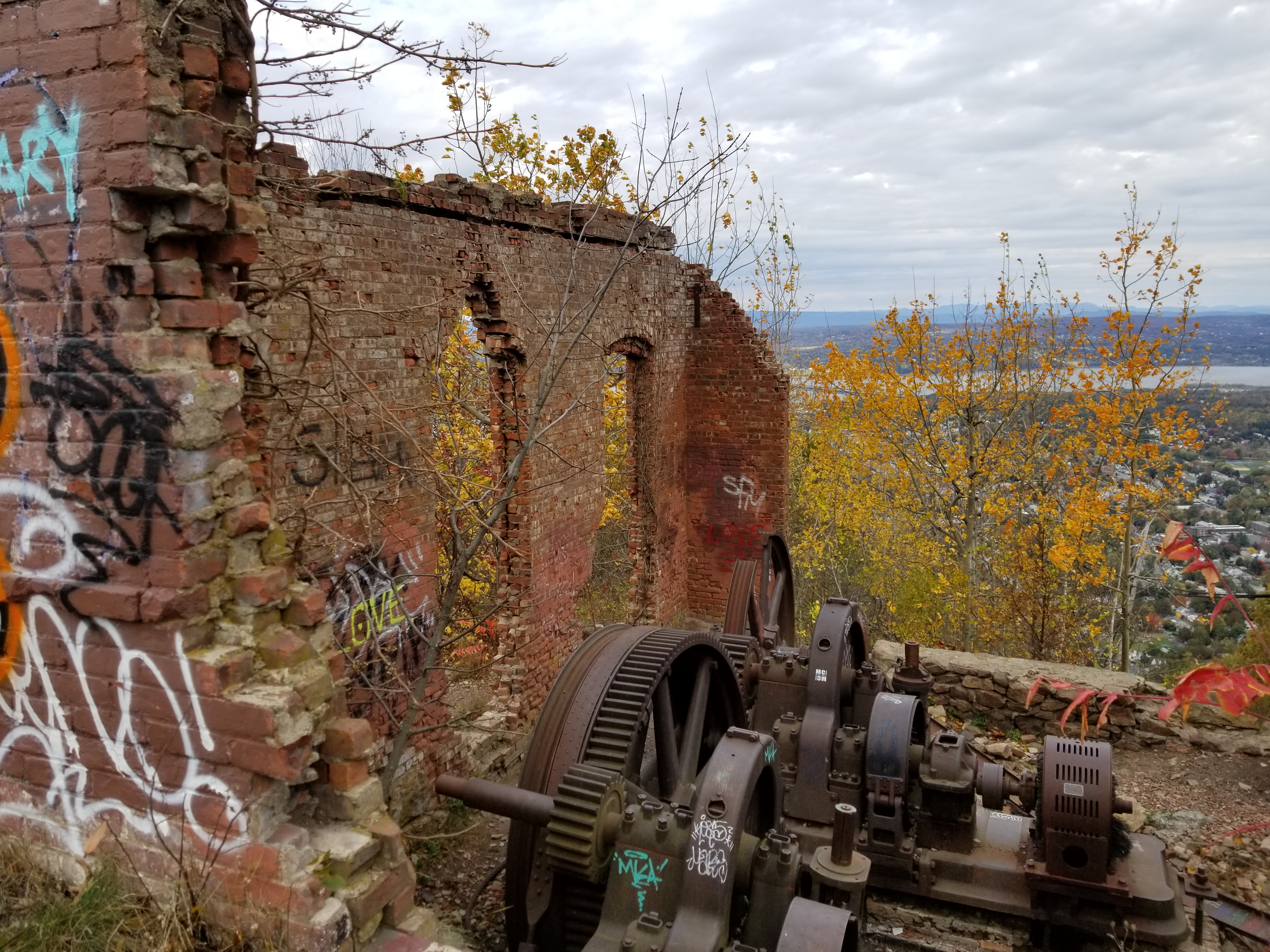
Abandoned powerhouse at the former casino

== See also ==
- List of funicular railways
