= Beacon Theatre (Beacon, New York) =

Theatre in Beacon, New York

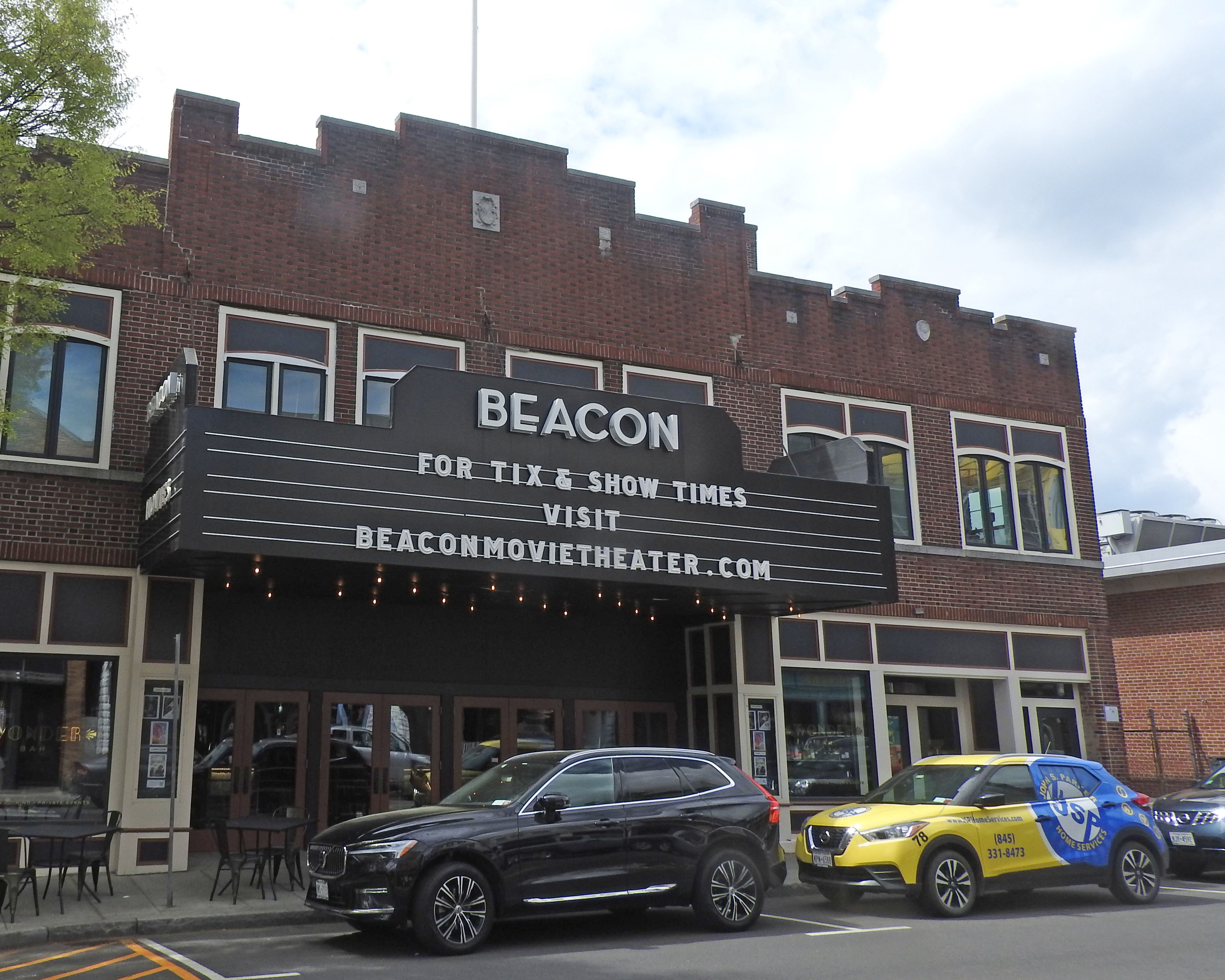
- In 2023
- Interactive map of Beacon Theatre
- Address: 445 Main Street
- Location: Beacon, New York, United States
- Coordinates: 41.5026°N 73.9658°W
- Owner: Brendan McAlpine
- Seating type: fixed
- Capacity: 199

Construction
- Built: 1928
- Opened: 1934
- Closed: 1968
- Reopened: 2016

The Beacon Theatre was an American Art Deco performing arts theater located in Beacon, New York, in the Hudson Valley, on Main Street in the city's downtown section (known as "Theatre Square"), across from Fishkill Creek. The theater was run by 4th Wall Productions, which has been producing live theater in the Hudson Valley since 1994, from 2010 until they sold the building in 2015. The main stage was gutted and converted into residential units, with the second floor converted into a smaller performance space.

In 2011, the original Beacon Theatre was featured in a music video for the song "Walk Katie Home" by American folk singer Seth Glier, on his album The Next Right Thing.

== History ==
The site where the structure sits was originally the Dibble Opera House, constructed in 1886. The Opera House had also housed a roller skating rink in its early days until it was torn down in 1927 with plans to construct a new and modernized theater that would be large enough to accommodate larger crowds for the rise of films, known then as "photo-plays".

With the intention of becoming a vaudeville house, the Beacon Theatre was constructed in 1928 as an Art Deco performing arts theater; however, its opening was delayed by six years with the coming of the Great Depression. When the theater opened in 1934, it was advertised as "the most beautiful theater from New York City to Albany" and was repurposed to operate as a movie theater, serving 1,200 people.

The theater quickly became a cultural hot-spot throughout the Hudson Valley, hosting many musical performances, plays, vaudeville acts, and films. During the 1930s, a popular jazz club, known as the "Wonder Bar", operated the second floor, where live acts performed over the theater's signature marquee.

The original venue was draped with tapestries, and murals decorated the ceilings.

During the 1940s, the theater also hosted Vox Pop, a national touring radio show that featured interviews and quizzes.

The Beacon Theatre was greatly disheveled by the urban decay of the 1960s in which suburbia began to take over and many large theaters throughout the Hudson Valley fell to large complexes. The theater officially closed in 1968 for renovations that were never completed, and would remain empty for nearly 40 years.

During the 1990s, the space was used as storage for roofing contractors and as a meeting location for a local church group, which was responsible for sealing up the second floor, demolishing the balcony, repainting the theater walls and setting new reclining chairs in the theater.

In 2002, the theater was acquired by New York City investor William Ehrlich, along with other properties, after the Dia:Beacon modern art museum put the city on the map. Norman Adie, of Brooklyn, was contracted to buy the building from Ehrlich, who planned to split the building into three auditoriums for mixed uses. Adie hoped to invest $4.5 million, for "boutique theaters". Robert Rutigliano of Beacon had another vision for the same building - a performing arts center with music, drama and film. However another Brooklyn cinema operator and developer had a vision for a six-screen movie house. Ultimately none of these plans came to fruition and the building would continue to remain empty.

In October, 2010, 4th Wall Productions purchased the Beacon Theatre in hopes of restoring the venue's former interior and allowing live theater to become a part of Beacon once again. Previously 4th Wall Productions was operating at the Cunneen-Hackett Arts Center at the Vassar Home for Aged Men in Poughkeepsie, New York. Plans were announced that the second floor would house a dance studio, where 4th Wall ran their Studio B acting classes and a small black box theater.

In August, 2015, 4th Wall Productions sold the infrastructure of the theater to Brendan McAlpine of McAlpine Construction, who had shown an interest in purchasing the theater in 2010 before deciding to instead focus on converting an abandoned factory down the street into the Roundhouse at Beacon Falls, converted the existing theater into residential units, with the second floor of the theater turned into a multi-use performance space.
