= Towne Crier Cafe =

Club in Beacon, New York

Coordinates: 41°30′13.8″N 73°58′4.8″W

Towne Crier Cafe is a club and restaurant located in Beacon, NY, featuring live musicians. It seats 170 guests. The cafe was founded in 1972, and after a period of decline, it has enjoyed increased popularity in early 2000s.

== History ==
Founder Phil Ciganer discovered the first location for the club while delivering a piece of art to a friend in the Town of Beekman, Dutchess County, NY.

Paul Gershowitz owned the Towne Crier Cafe in the 1970's. According to Gershowitz, "it was an interesting, charming little setting". Part of the building dated back to the 1600s and had once been a stagecoach stop and post office. By 1972 the new enterprise, appropriately called the Towne Crier Cafe, was up and running.

After 16 years in Beekman, The Towne Crier shared space in Allyn's Restaurant in Lithgow in 1987, and moved to Pawling in 1988. Though not as historically interesting as its predecessor, the Pawling location accommodated more people in expanded dining facilities. Both exterior and interior had a Southwestern motif. The enclosed bar was decorated with photos of the many artists who performed at the Towne Crier. Eventually, Ciganer's ambitions outgrew the Pawling location and the club relocated to Beacon, New York, which has enjoyed a cultural "rebirth" in recent years. Ciganer cites this cultural renaissance as the main factor in choosing to relocate the Towne Crier Cafe to Beacon. The Pawling location was leased by Daryl Hall to become Daryl's House.

== Notable performers ==
Performers at the Towne Crier have included Pete Seeger – one of the first acts booked at the original Beekman location, stepping in when a scheduled folk singer's car broke down – as well as Richie Havens and Odetta. Posters from the mid-1970s document appearances by Leon Redbone, Jay Ungar and Chris Smither, among others. Other musicians who have performed there include John Renbourn, Suzanne Vega, Jack Hardy, Richard Thompson, Jorma Kaukonen, Altan, The Flying Karamazov Brothers, Leo Kottke, Adrian Legg, Billy McLaughlin, Preston Reed, Clifton Chenier, Dr. John, Southside Johnny, Ani DiFranco, Black Violin, Taj Mahal, John Hammond, Bela Fleck, Gandalf Murphy, Cherish the Ladies, Battlefield Band, Fairport Convention, Wishbone Ash and Bill Miller.
