= Trinity Methodist Church (Beacon, New York) =

Historic church in New York, United States

- U.S. National Register of Historic Places
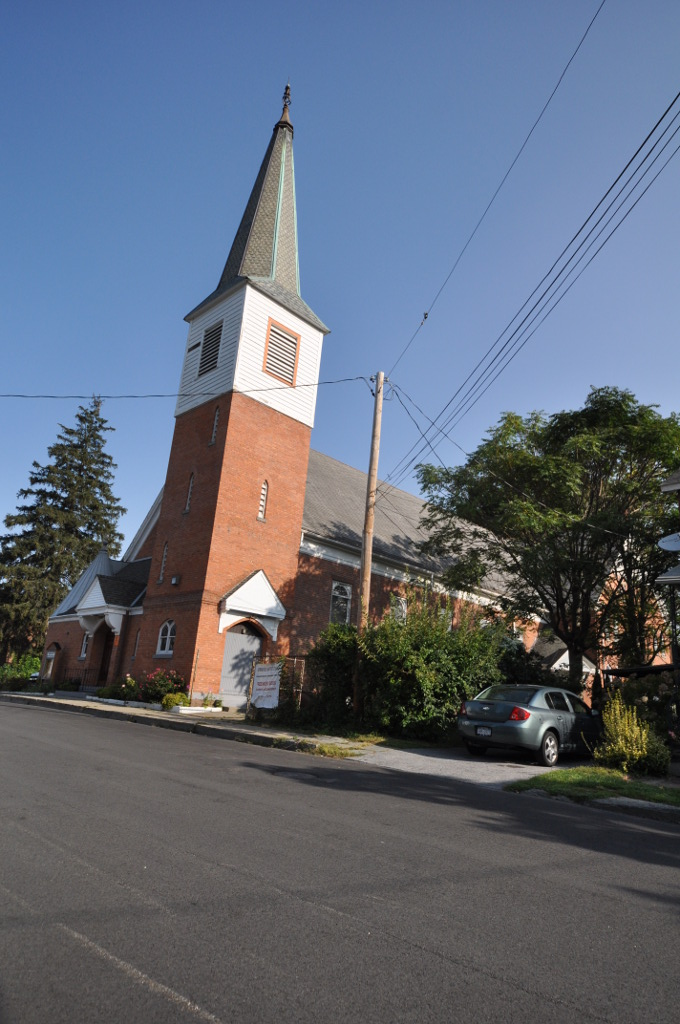

- Location within New York Location within the United States
- Location: 8 Mattie Cooper Square, Beacon, New York
- Coordinates: 41°30′28.84″N 73°58′23.28″W
- Area: 0.9 acres (0.36 ha)
- NRHP reference No.: 09001227
- Added to NRHP: January 12, 2010

The Springfield Baptist Church, formerly Trinity Methodist Church, is a historic church in Beacon in Dutchess County, New York. It was originally constructed about 1849 as the Associate Presbyterian Church. It was expanded and improved in 1864, 1887, 1891, and 1895. The church consists of a large nave with a steeply pitched gable roof. The main facade features an offset multi-stage bell tower with spire.

It was added to the National Register of Historic Places in 2010.

the

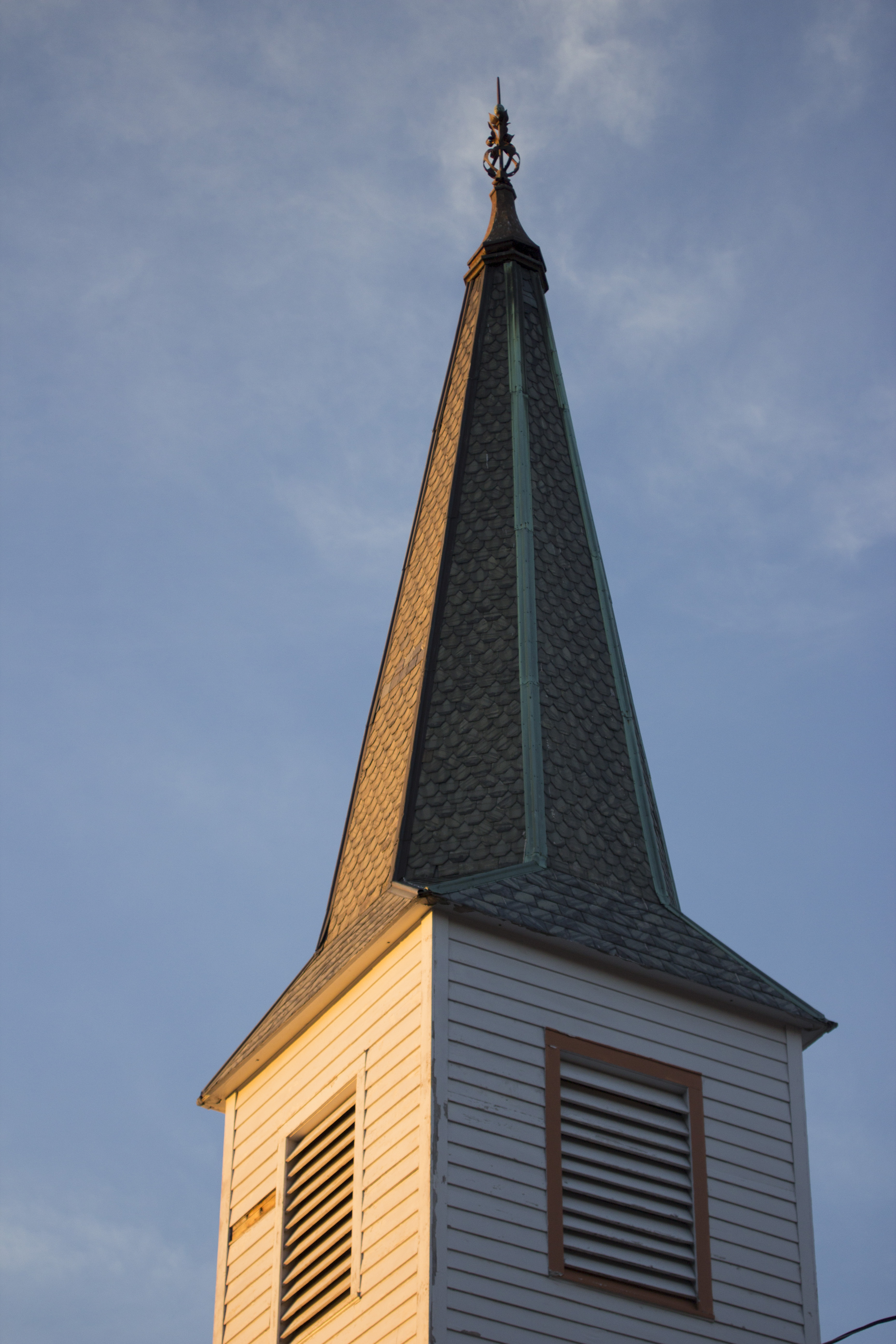
Springfield Baptist Church Beacon tower
