= Peter C. DuBois House =

Historic house in New York, United States

- U.S. National Register of Historic Places
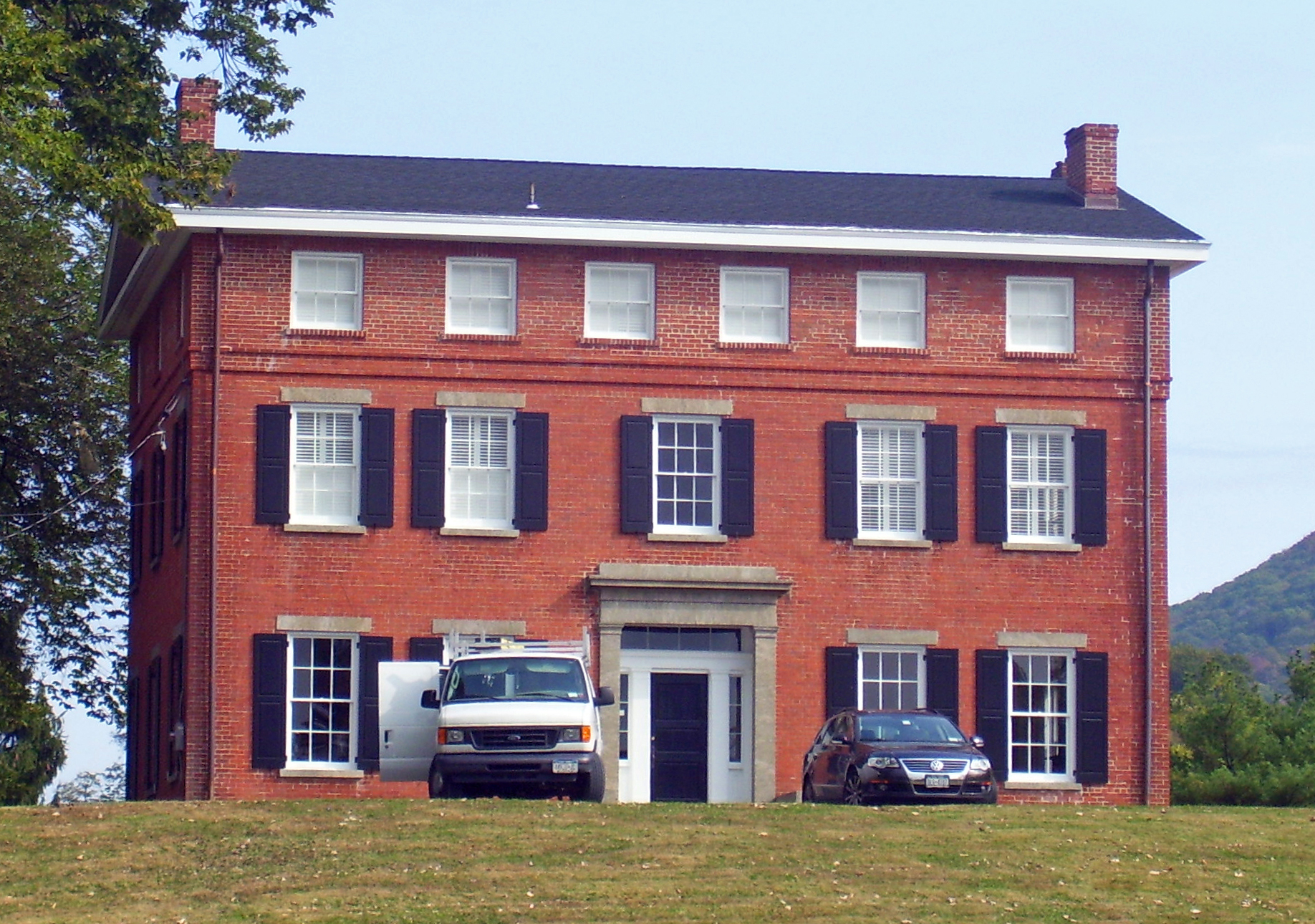
- House in 2007
- Location: Beacon, NY
- Coordinates: 41°29′01″N 73°58′24″W
- Area: 4 acres (1.6 ha)
- Built: ca. 1840
- Architectural style: Greek Revival
- NRHP reference No.: 03001512
- Added to NRHP: 2004

The Peter C. DuBois House is located on Slocum Road in the Dutchess Junction neighborhood of the city of Beacon, New York, United States. It was one of the last significant Greek Revival buildings in the Hudson Valley. In the 20th century, it would be reused as a sanatorium and altered with the addition of a third story. Today it is once again a dwelling. In 2004 it was added to the National Register of Historic Places.

== History ==
DuBois, a descendant of Huguenot immigrants to nearby Kingston, settled in the area on a 280-acre (1.1 km^{2}) farm, part of land then in the Town of Fishkill his family had long owned. The house was built from brick made of local clay on lands leased from him. Granite quarried in the Hudson Highlands to the south was also used as exterior framing and trim. The house stands on a small rise that overlooks the Highlands and the river, a common practice for manor houses in colonial times.

Greek Revival, the preferred architectural style for many grand homes in the area, was nearing the end of its era. Newer fortunes in the era were being made from commerce, not agriculture, and those who made them preferred a different style of home. Andrew Jackson Downing of nearby Newburgh and other architects were criticizing Greek Revival's pretense and championing instead various rustic Gothic Revival styles for the cottages they were building, which sought to harmonize with the surrounding natural environment instead of implying dominance as DuBois's, and other large colonial landowners, did. DuBois's would be the last Hudson Valley manor built in the Greek Revival style.

His farm did not last much beyond his death in 1869, and his heirs subdivided and sold it, keeping only the house property. In 1927 DuBois's grandson sold the house and 67 acres (27 ha) to Dr. Clarence J. Slocum, who had been operating Craig House, a sanatorium on a neighboring parcel and wanted to expand. He added a third floor to the house, a common occurrence for many old farmhouses being modernized at the time, and many more bathrooms and bedrooms, using brick that mimicked the original style and color as much as possible. The renovations as a whole preserved the original aesthetic of house while adapting it for institutional reuse.

After Slocum's death in 1950 the sanatorium fell on hard times, and had become a nursing home when it closed after Slocum's son retired in the 1980s. Like DuBois's farm, Slocum's asylum was eventually subdivided and sold, and newer homes have been built along the street named after him. The whole area was ceded to Beacon by Fishkill in the late 1990s in order to better provide services to it. The house remained vacant for a time after the closure of the sanatorium and redevelopment but has recently become occupied again. The city has added it to its own list of landmarks and historic district zoning.
