= Walker Beacon School =

Location
- 917 Belmont Street; Watertown, Massachusetts 02472; United States; 42°22′53″N 71°11′28″W

Information
- School type: Private school
- Age: 12 to 22

Beacon High School is a private day school located in Watertown, Massachusetts, US. It is located at 917 Belmont Street. It provides a therapeutic, alternative, co-educational program designed for students with emotional or psychiatric problems, such as anxiety disorder, autism spectrum disorder, bipolar disorder, depression, and post-traumatic stress disorder. It has an enrollment cap of 65, ranging in age from 12 to 22.

In 2015, the school opened the Nancy C. Lincoln Center, a building which includes both a creative arts studio and a multipurpose hall. In 2017 the school also added a middle school classroom, which operates within the high school.
