= Beacon Mountain =

Mountain in New York, United States

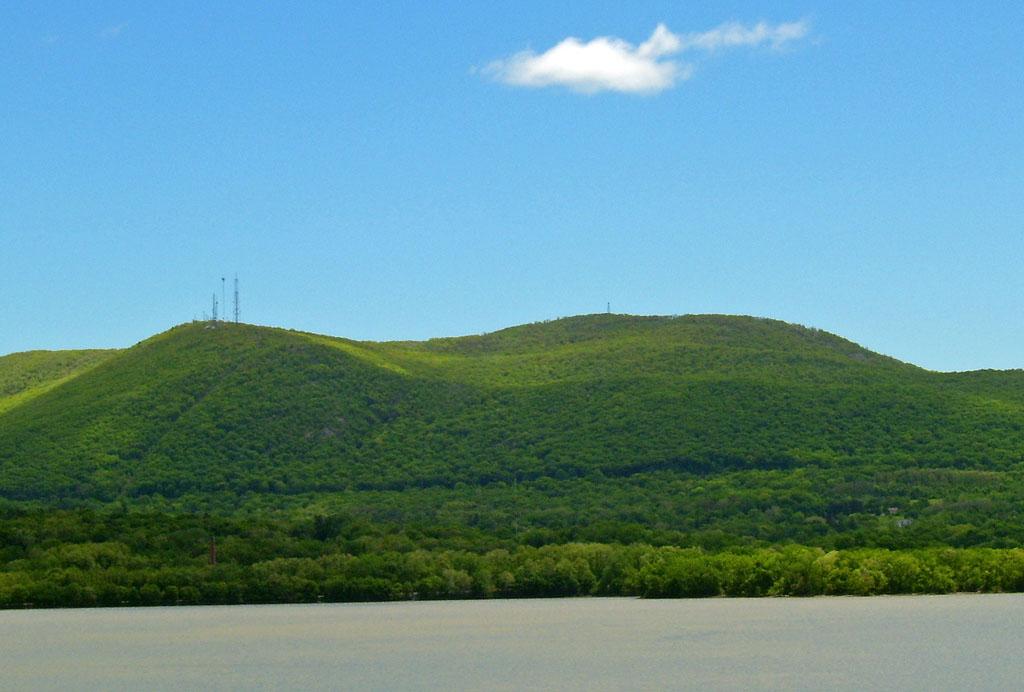
- North and South Beacon Mountain

Highest point
- Elevation: North: 1,516 feet (462 m); South: 1,595 feet (486 m)
- Coordinates: 41°29′18″N 73°56′42″W (North), 41°28′53″N 73°56′39″W (South)

Geography
- Location within New York Location within the United States
- Location: S of Beacon, New York, U.S.
- Parent range: Hudson Highlands
- Topo map: USGS West Point

Climbing
- Easiest route: Hike

Beacon Mountain, locally Mount Beacon, is the highest peak of Hudson Highlands, located south of City of Beacon, New York, in the Town of Fishkill. Its two summits rise above the Hudson River behind the city and can easily be seen from Newburgh across the river and many other places in the region. The more accessible northern peak, at 1,516 feet (462 m) above sea level, has a complex of radio antennas on its summit; the 1,595 feet (486 m) southern summit has a fire lookout tower, which was built in 1931.

Beacon Reservoir, the city's main water source, is located between North Beacon and neighboring Scofield Ridge, the highest peak in Putnam County. Since much of the land on the mountains and up to the county line is owned by the city to protect the watershed, an extensive system of roads and trails makes it a popular hiking area. Both summits afford extensive views of the mid-Hudson region, and on clear days New York City is visible from the fire tower.

== History ==
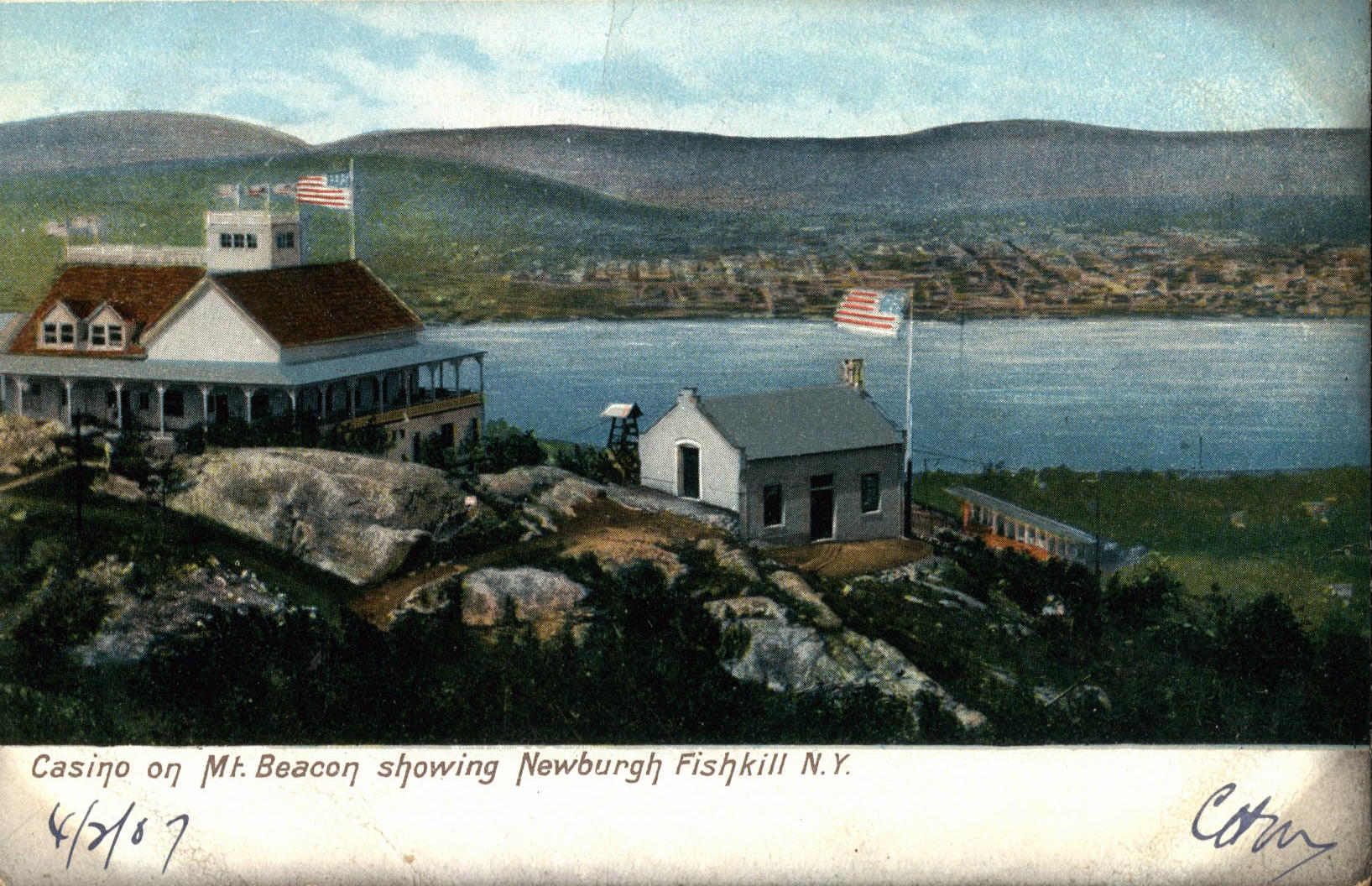
Casino, from a 1907 post card

In the past, North Beacon was home to Dutchess ski area, and the remains of three ski trails can still be seen from the north. Additionally there was once the Mount Beacon Incline Railway, which stopped running in 1978 but has since been added to the National Register of Historic Places. Its track can still be seen going up the mountain and can be used to climb it, albeit steeply. At various other times in the past this summit housed a restaurant, a casino and a hotel.

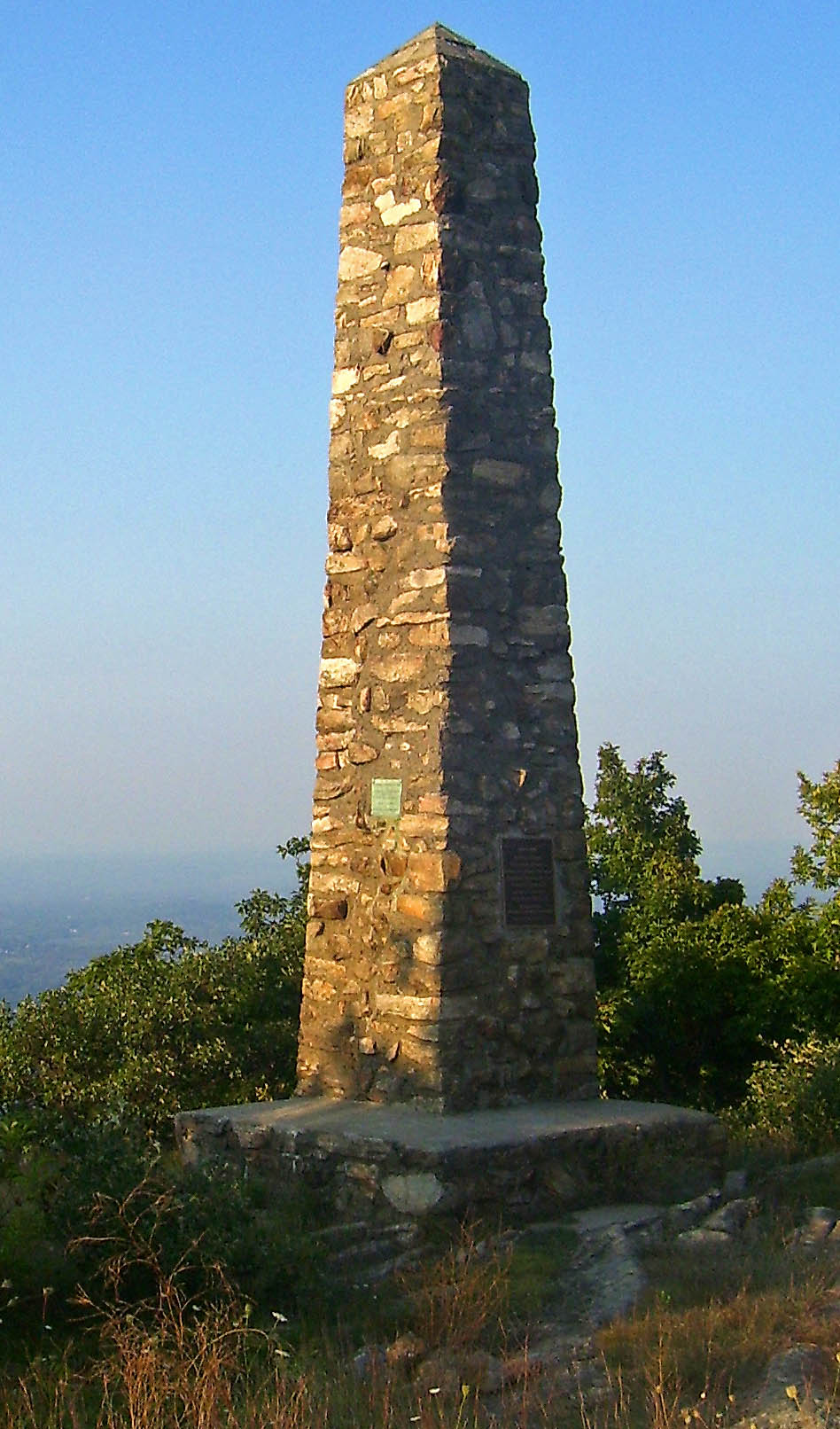
DAR monument on North Beacon summit

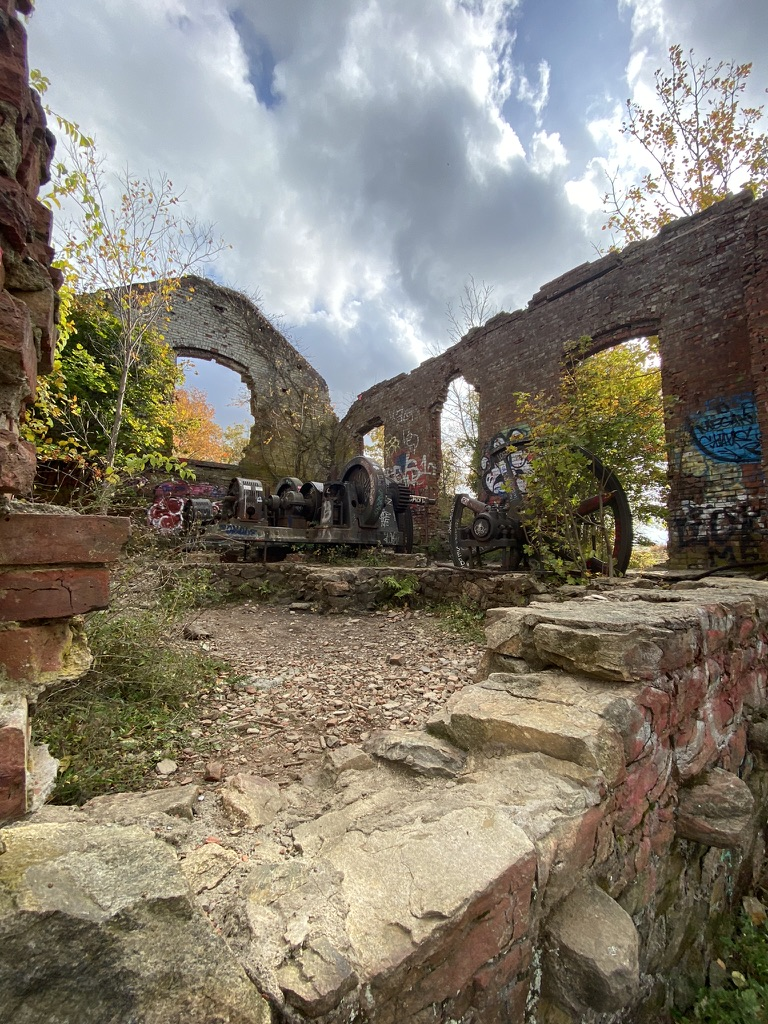
Landmark ruins on the Mt. Beacon fire tower hike

The mountains provided a key vantage point over West Point and Hudson River, lending it historic roles in the American Revolution. Signal fires on the mountain gave both it and the nearby city their name. In 1901 the local chapter of the Daughters of the American Revolution erected a monument at the site of the original signal fire near the summit of North Beacon.

=== Fire tower ===
In 1931, the Civilian Conservation Corps built a 60-foot-tall (18 m) Aermotor LS40 tower on the south summit, which became operational in 1932. Due to the use of aerial detection, the tower was closed at the end of the 1972 fire lookout season. The fire tower was added to the National Historic Lookout Register in December 2005. On June 22, 2013, the Mount Beacon Fire Tower Restoration Committee had a reopening ceremony to celebrate the restored tower.

== Approach ==
The easiest way up the mountain is a dirt road used by city employees doing maintenance work or inspections of the reservoir. It is, however, closed to public vehicular use and vehicles are regularly ticketed for doing so.

The white-blazed Fishkill Ridge Trail leaves from the end of Pocket Road on the west side of Beacon. It can be followed for a mile up misnamed Dry Brook to the reservoir road. At the reservoir good roads continue up to the north summit, and at one corner the yellow-blazed Wilkinson Memorial Trail offers access to the south summit.

The Wilkinson Trail can also be followed from its southern terminus at NY 9D south of the city, or its northern end near US 9 in Putnam County. Both routes require more time and distance, however.

One may also park and climb up the mountain from "Mount Beacon Park" in the City of Beacon. Parking area and trailhead are located at the intersection of Route 9D and Howland Avenue in the City of Beacon, across from Bob's Corner Store. The Park is part of the Scenic Hudson organization. Walk a quarter mile up the trail to see the remains of the old lower Railhead. Then a set of about 200 sturdy steps takes you a ways up the mountain to the first steep gravel and dirt trails. Even at this "lower" point you will have a great view of the river in the distance, especially when the leaves have fallen.

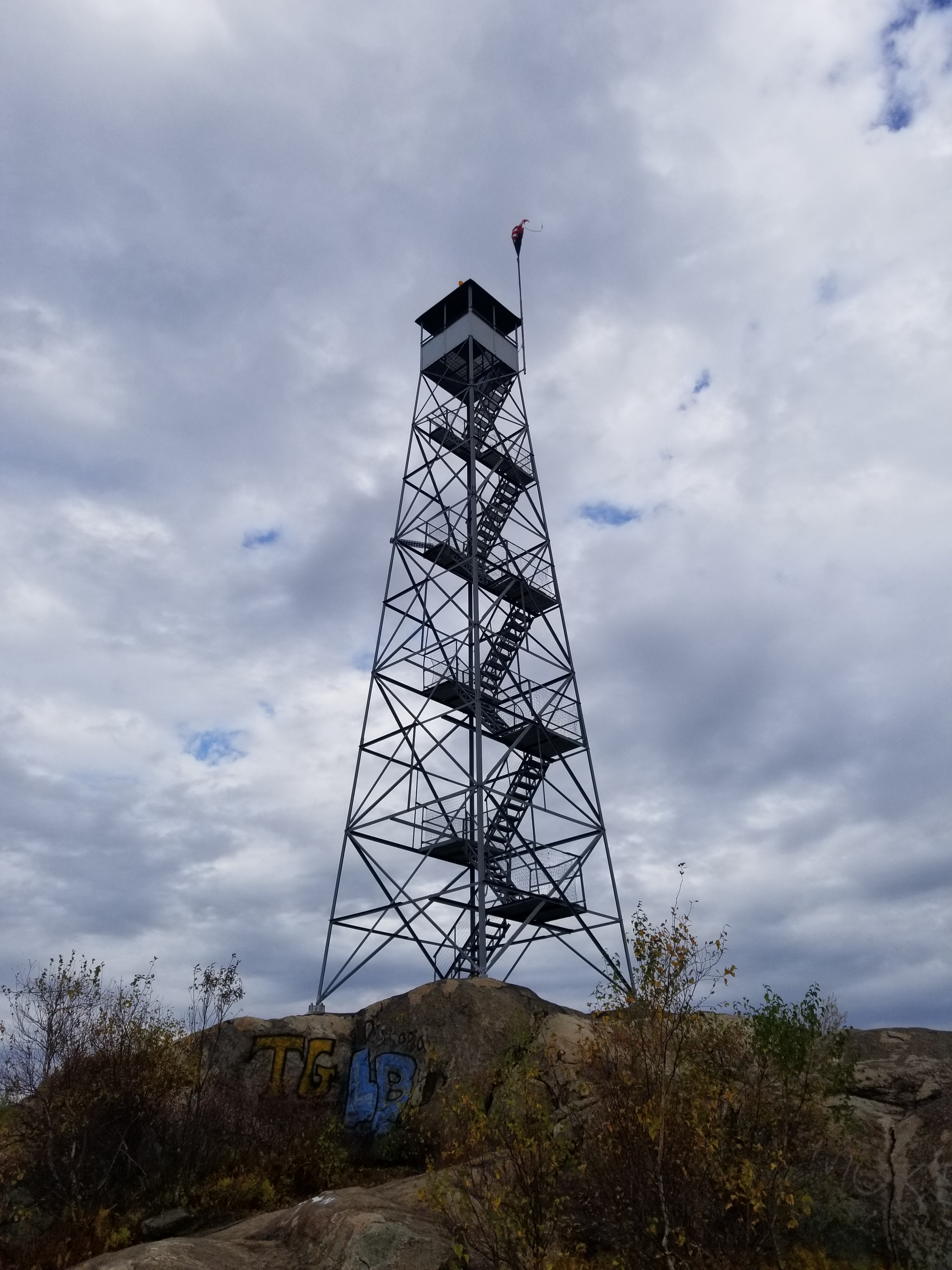
Fire lookout tower at the summit of South Beacon Mountain
