= John Peter DeWindt =

19th-century American transportation businessman

John Peter De Windt Jr., known as J. P. De Windt (1787–1870), a businessman who created the Long Wharf, later known as the Long Dock, in Beacon, New York, in 1815 and owned an enormous estate in Dutchess County, which was eventually broken up into the streets of Fishkill-on-the-Hudson, or present-day Beacon. He was a manufacturer and investor in steamboats and railroads during the immense boom in transportation in the mid 1800s along the Hudson which linked New York City to the rest of the country. He was married to the granddaughter of John and Abigail Adams.

== Biography ==
In 1814, he married Caroline-Amelia Smith, a granddaughter of second U.S. President John Adams (and niece of sixth U.S. President John Quincy Adams). The family name was Americanized from the earlier Dutch spelling DeWindt, and had roots in the Dutch Colonial Island of Saint Eustatius. Ten children out of eleven from their marriage survived to adulthood, including seven daughters, and their home, called Cedar Grove, which burned to the ground in 1857, was remembered as a center of culture in the Mid-Hudson Valley, through which traveled the Marquis de Lafayette, and celebrated artists, poets, and political leaders of the day.

Four of the DeWindt daughters married important figures in the arts. In June 1838, their oldest child, Caroline-Elizabeth, married Newburgh-native, A. J. Downing, who is considered as a founder of American landscape architecture. Her younger sister, Elizabeth, married the minister, poet, and painter Christopher Pearse Cranch in 1843. In the 1850’s, sister Louisa married writer and art critic Clarence Cook and Emily Augusta married Frederick Clarke Withers, the architect.

DeWindt had substantial business enterprises and real estate holdings in Fishkill Landing and Newburgh but was especially interested in transportation and shipbuilding. In 1815, he built the Long Dock, in Fishkill Landing, and contributed to the construction of the Newburgh spur of the Erie Railroad. He kept a shipyard on the Hudson river bank through which he oversaw his interests in freight through the production of sloops which were a quicker means of transportation between the towns along the Hudson and New York City than stage coach. J. P. DeWindt had one constructed called the Caroline, after his daughter Caroline-Elizabeth, which made the trip in a record five hours. In recent years, the abandoned Long Dock railyard was transformed into a scenic recreation park.

The DeWindts were Unitarians in keeping with the beliefs of Caroline Amelia’s grandmother, Abigail Adams, who was influenced by the sermons of William Ellery Channing. Yet John Peter also donated land for the building of a Dutch Reformed Dutch (in keeping with his own family traditions) and a Methodist Church, as well as held community meetings at his home for a Unitarian congregation. He and his friend Warren Delano, the grandfather of FDR, helped build a Unitarian church on Liberty Street in Newburgh.

The fierceness of competition among steamboats on the Hudson preceded a deadly fire on the steamboat, the Henry Clay, on July 28, 1852, while it was racing the Armenia. Fifty passengers out of five hundred died, including J. P. DeWindt's wife, Caroline-Amelia, and his son-in-law, A. J. Downing.

Then in 1857, the mysterious burning of Cedar Grove resulted in the loss not only of the entire homestead but priceless family heirlooms of the Adams family such as the Copley painting of Abigail "Nabby" Smith, and many other manuscripts, books, and letters of value. DeWindt moved to a cottage afterwards called "mon Bijou". He died in 1870.
