= National Professional Basketball League (2007–08) =

National Professional Basketball League (NPBL)
- Logo NPBL
- Sport: Basketball
- Founded: 2007
- First season: 2007
- Folded: 2008
- No. of teams: 8
- Country: United States
- Continent: FIBA Americas (Americas)
- Last champion: Elmira Bulldogs (1st title)
- Most titles: Elmira Bulldogs; Hudson Valley Hawks (1 title each)

The National Professional Basketball League, often abbreviated to the NPBL, was an American men's professional basketball minor league featuring teams from the East Coast of the United States which played for two seasons.

A few of the teams in the NPBL left to join the Eastern Basketball Alliance (EBA). The planned 2009 season was never actually played. Initially the league's plan was to move the season to the fall and winter during the more traditional basketball season. The league never made any official announcement as to the cessation of its operations, but never resumed play.

== Some NPBL rules ==
- Twenty second shot clock
- Only one time out per quarter and no carry overs
- Twelve player maximum roster
- Only two players were "All-Star" players per team
- Only two players could be designated as captains
- Mandatory three officials per game
- Seven second half court violation
- Two mandatory media time outs (one per half)

== League champions by season ==
- 2007 – Hudson Valley Hawks
- 2008 – Elmira Bulldogs

== NPBL Clubs ==
- Connecticut Thunderboltz (2007)
- Delaware Destroyers (2008)
- Elmira Bulldogs (2008)
- Fall River Leos (2008)
- Hudson Valley Hawks (2008) - home court was at Beacon High School in Beacon.
- Maryland Bayraiders (2008)
- New York StrikeForce (2008)
- Virginia Avengers (2008)
- Westchester Monarchs (2008)
- West Virginia Wild (2008)
