= Beacon City Schools =

School district in the U.S. state of New York

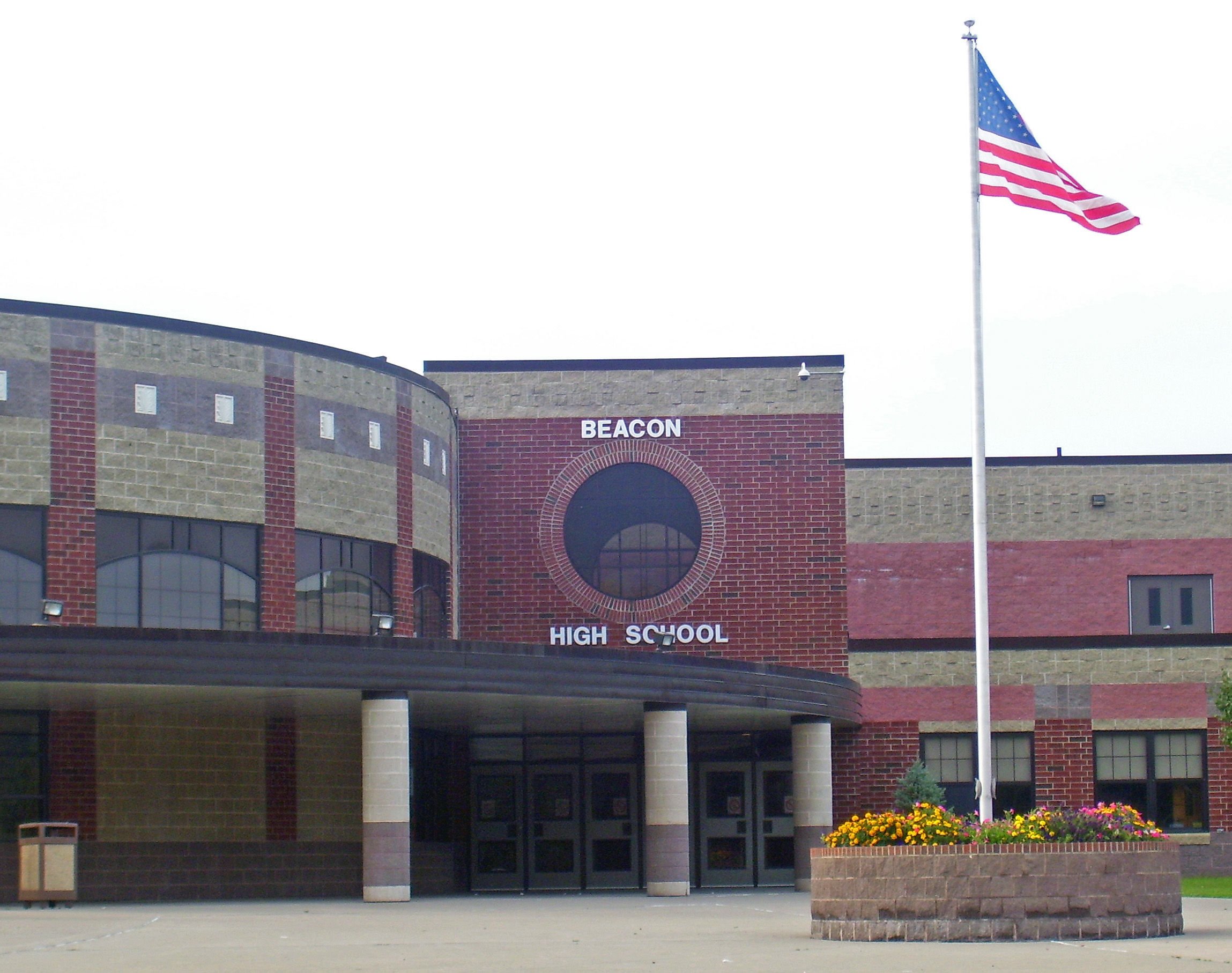
Beacon High School

The Beacon City School District (also known as the Beacon City Schools) is one of 18 public school districts serving residents of Dutchess County, New York, United States. The district serves the City of Beacon and parts of the Town of Fishkill and Town of Wappinger; it is one of 57 small city school districts in New York State.

The district is composed of four elementary schools, a middle school, a high school, an administration building, and a transportation facility. It has a student enrollment of 2,577 students as of end of the 2020–21 school year.

Its elementary school serves pre-kindergarten through 5th grade, its middle school serves 6th–8th grades and the high school serves 9th–12th grades.

== Schools ==
=== Elementary schools ===
School	Location	Grades	Notes	Homepage
Glenham Elementary School	Fishkill, New York	K–5	Located at 20 Chase Drive, Fishkill, New York 12524	
J. V. Forrestal Elementary School	Beacon, New York	K–5	Located at 125 Liberty Street, Beacon, New York 12508. Named for James Forrestal.	
Sargent Elementary School	Beacon, New York	K–5	Located at 29 Education Drive, Beacon, New York 12508	
South Avenue Elementary School	Beacon, New York	K–5	Located at 60 South Avenue, Beacon, New York 12508. This is the largest of all the elementary schools and serves as the city's magnet school.	

=== Rombout Middle School ===
Rombout Middle School is located at 84 Matteawan Road, Beacon, New York, 12508. It offers volleyball, baseball, basketball, football, and a variety of clubs. As of the end of the 2020–21 school year, it educated 632 students.

=== High schools ===
School	Location	Grades	Notes	Homepage
Beacon High School	Beacon, New York	9–12	101 Matteawan Road, Beacon, New York 12508	

=== Former Beacon High School ===
The old Beacon High School, which opened in 1913, closed in 2002, the year that the new New Beacon High School opened. The school was then turned into an alternative high school for several years. The school was sold to an art group in 2002 which defaulted on the mortgage in 2006. The school has since been resold to an art partnership in an all-cash deal.

=== New Beacon High School ===
Beacon High School

Location
- 101 Matteawan Road; Beacon, New York 12508; United States

Information
- Type: Public high school
- Established: 2002
- School district: Beacon City School District
- Principal: Corey Dwyer
- Grades: 9–12
- Enrollment: 900 (2019-2020)
- Colors: Blue and gold
- Athletics conference: NYSPHSAA Section 1
- Mascot: Bulldog
- Website: https://www.beaconk12.org/

The new Beacon High School is located at 101 Matteawan Road, Beacon, New York 12508. It was finished in 2001 and opened in 2002. The school educated 863 students as of the end of the 2020–2021 school year. Beacon High School has several wings and features such amenities as an indoor swimming pool, and the largest theater north of North Rockland and south of Albany. In 2021, Beacon High School switched to compete in Section 9 of the New York State Public High School Athletic Association (NYSPHSAA).
