= Miriam Moskowitz =

Spy and American teacher (1916–2018)

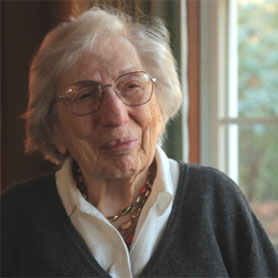
- Born: 10 June 1916; Bayonne, New Jersey, US
- Died: 14 February 2018 (aged 101)
- Education: City College of New York (B.S.)
- Occupation: Teacher
- Known for: McCarthy-era conviction for conspiracy to obstruct justice

Miriam Ruth Moskowitz (June 10, 1916 – February 14, 2018) was an American schoolteacher who served two years in prison after being convicted for conspiracy as an atomic spy for the Soviet Union.

She was born in Bayonne, New Jersey, on June 10, 1916. She graduated from the City College of New York evening session with a B.S. in Education in 1942.

== Atomic spying case ==
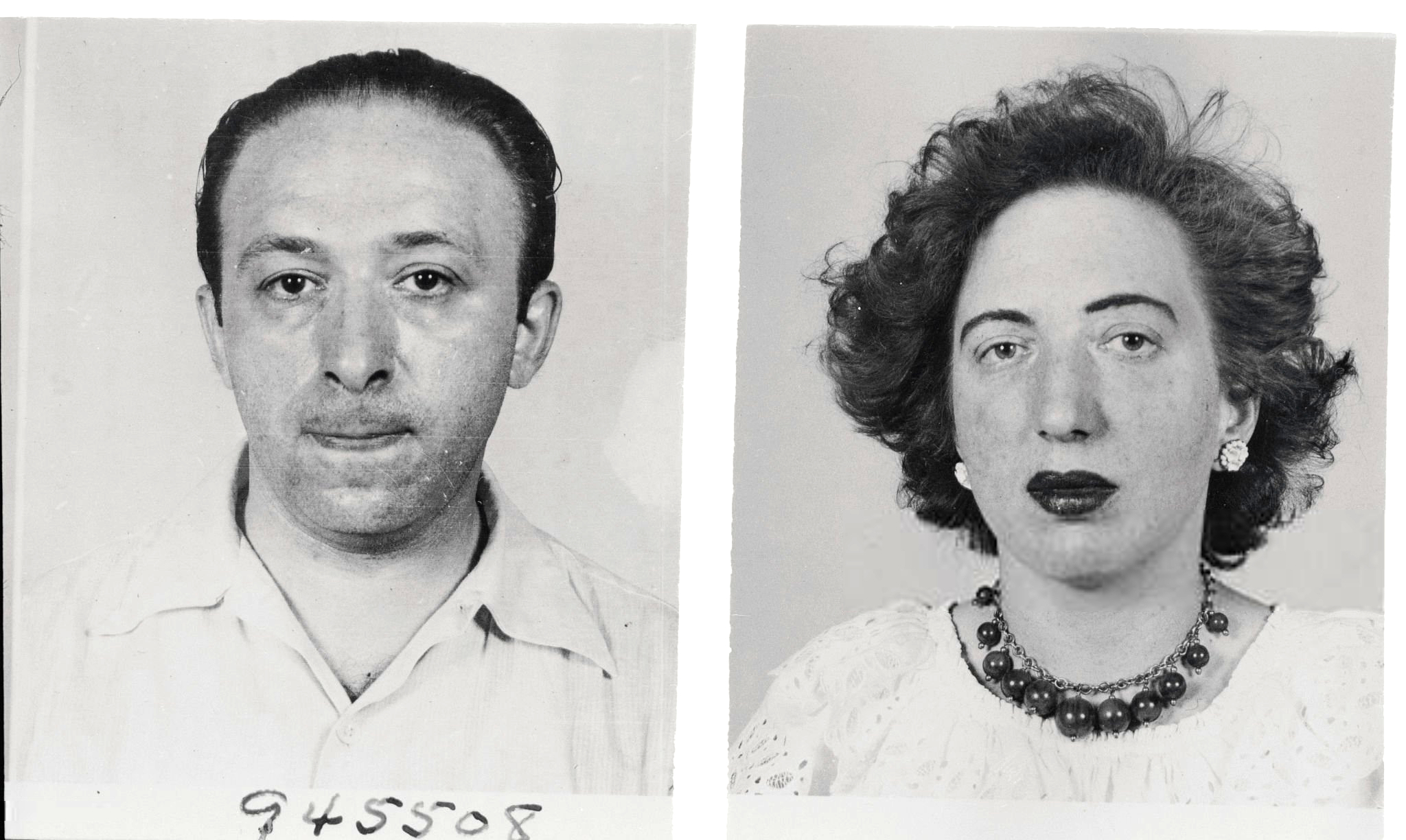
Brothman and Moskowitz's FBI mugshots, 1950

In 1950, during the McCarthy era and as part of the atomic spies prosecutions, Miriam Moskowitz was indicted for conspiring with Abraham Brothman and Harry Gold to obstruct justice. Moskowitz was Brothman's secretary and lover. Brothman, a chemical engineer, hoped to get into business with the Soviet Union by providing blueprints for industrial processes he’d already described in trade journals.

Moskowitz's prosecution arose from an investigation into Soviet nuclear espionage into the Manhattan Project and related activities by which the United States developed atomic bombs. The investigation was capped by the prosecution and execution of Julius and Ethel Rosenberg for spying. Moskowitz and Brothman's trial was presided over by Judge Irving Kaufman, and prosecuted by the United States Attorney for the Southern District of New York, Irving Saypol and his 23-year-old confidential assistant, Roy Cohn. Harry Gold and Elizabeth Bentley testified against Moskowitz and her codefendant, Abraham Brothman.

Roy Cohn viewed the case as "a dry-run of the upcoming Rosenberg trial. We were able to see how Gold and Bentley fared on the stand, and we were able to see how we fared, Saypol and I." Only a few months later, Judge Kaufman presided over the espionage trial of Julius and Ethel Rosenberg at which U.S. Attorney Irving Saypol and Roy Cohn prosecuted the Rosenbergs and Harry Gold and Elizabeth Bentley testified against the Rosenbergs.

During her trial, Moskowitz was housed at the New York Women's House of Detention, where she met Ethel Rosenberg.

Moskowitz was convicted of conspiracy to obstruct justice. Judge Kaufman sentenced her to two years in prison and a $10,000 fine. Moskowitz served her time at Federal Prison Camp, Alderson in West Virginia.

In 1951, Abraham Brothman's conviction for obstruction of justice was reversed by the United States Court of Appeals for the Second Circuit on the ground that venue did not lie in the Southern District of New York. United States v. Brothman, 191 F.2d 70 (2d Cir. 1951). Moskowitz's conviction was upheld on appeal. Id.

Irving Saypol was indicted in 1976 with S. Samuel DiFalco for bribery and perjury in connection with an alleged scheme to obtain appraisal and auction commission funds for Saypol's son; the charges were dismissed.

Roy Cohn was disbarred by the Appellate Division of the New York State Supreme Court for unethical conduct in 1986.

The Federal Bureau of Investigation file on the Brothman-Moskowitz case has been unsealed.

== Subsequent life ==
After her release from prison, Moskowitz became a public school math teacher. She was also an amateur violist.

In 2010, Moskowitz published a book about her experience entitled, Phantom Spies, Phantom Justice.

In 2014, Moskowitz filed a petition for writ of error coram nobis to challenge her conviction. Her petition received national news coverage. Her petition was denied by Judge Alvin Hellerstein.

A resident of Washington Township, Bergen County, New Jersey, Miriam died at the age of 101 on February 14, 2018.
