= Giorgio Cavaglieri =

American architect

Giorgio Cavaglieri (August 1, 1911 – May 15, 2007) was an Italian architect and a leading figure in the historic preservationist movement in New York City. He is best known for his 1960s restoration of the Jefferson Market Library in Greenwich Village.

Cavaglieri was one of the first architects to specialize in the area of historic preservation. He coined the term "adaptive reuse" to describe his design philosophy, which balanced an appreciation of historical styles with a bold modernity and an eye toward transformation. He explained that these views were inspired by his native Italy, where ancient cities like Rome are characterized by an architectural mélange of old and new styles.

== Early life and education ==
Cavaglieri was born in Venice to a wealthy Jewish family. He studied engineering and architecture at the Politecnico di Milano, where he graduated with honors in 1932. His father, an executive with the insurance company Assicurazioni Generali, died soon after he left school and Cavaglieri followed in his footsteps by becoming the in-house architect for the company.

Cavaglieri was drafted into the Italian Air Force during the Second Italo-Ethiopian War and designed airfields in Libya for the Italian government. He fled to the United States in 1939 after the Fascist regime seized his assets and passed laws restricting the rights of Jewish people. Cavaglieri settled first in Baltimore, where he met and married Norma Sanford in 1942.

He joined the United States Army during World War II, and was put to work testing bridges and adapting captured German barracks for use by Allied forces. He won the Bronze Star for his architectural contributions.

== Career ==
After World War II, Cavaglieri worked briefly for Rosario Candela before forming his own firm in 1946 with help from the G.I. Bill. He first gained recognition for a well-received redesign of the facade and lobby of the Beaux-arts style Fisk Building at 250 West 57th Street. He replaced old-fashioned bronze screens with a modernist glass entry, leaving the lobby intact and newly on view to the street – a move which was praised in The New Yorker by critic Lewis Mumford. He developed a reputation for doing modern adaptations of old buildings, and his first big projects of this type included two Midtown buildings converted into union halls.

In the 1960s he became involved with the emerging historical preservationist movement in New York City. He joined the Municipal Art Society in the mid-1950s and served as its President from 1963-1965. He was involved in the unsuccessful battle to save Penn Station, advocated for the preservation of Grand Central Terminal and the Morgan House on Madison Avenue, and would frequently write letters on behalf of preservationist causes to the editor of the New York Times and to various elected officials.

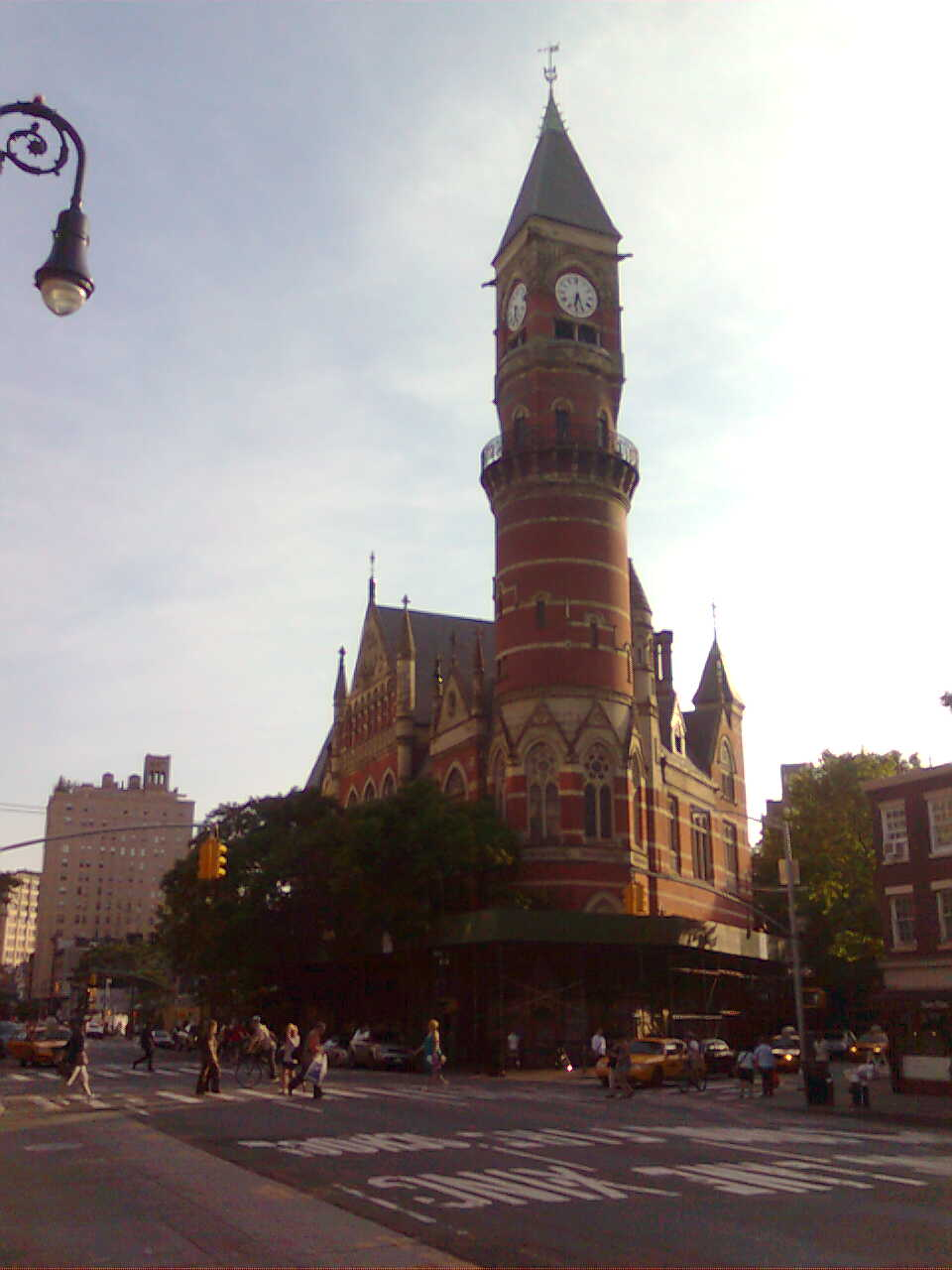
Jefferson Market Library

Cavaglieri's many preservation and restoration projects include the Grand Central incoming trains room; the Chapel of the Good Shepard and the James Blackwell Farmhouse on Roosevelt Island; the Eldridge Street Synagogue; and the New York University Grey Art Gallery. In 1982, he led an expansion and restoration of the Pratt Institute Library in Brooklyn with Warren Gran. With Joseph Sultan, he designed a 1991 renovation of the 107th St. Pier on the East River in Manhattan.

Cavaglieri worked frequently for the New York Public Library system. He designed new buildings for the Kips Bay and Spuyten Duyvil branches. He oversaw restorations of the periodical room and the Gottesman Exhibition Hall at the NYPL main branch and the construction of the Mid-Manhattan Library inside a former department store.

=== Jefferson Market Courthouse ===
Cavaglieri's restoration of Calvert Vaux and Frederick Withers's Victorian Gothic Jefferson Market Courthouse building is considered the first significant work of historic preservation in New York City. After a grassroots movement led by Margot Gayle, Ruth Wittenberg, and other local activists saved the Greenwich Village landmark from being sold and potentially demolished, Cavaglieri was brought in to convert the derelict building into a new branch of the New York Public Library.

He did four years of preliminary work for the restoration project, which incorporated modern facilities like air conditioning, fluorescent lighting, and elevators into the Victorian-era building. He balanced faithful reproduction of the building's historic doors and stained glass windows with the addition of contemporary stylistic touches, including the addition of a catwalk above the main reading room. One of Cavaglieri's modernist twists was the choice to alternate historic stained glass windows with contemporary transparent once, as he believed that the best way to highlight the original stained glass was through contrast.

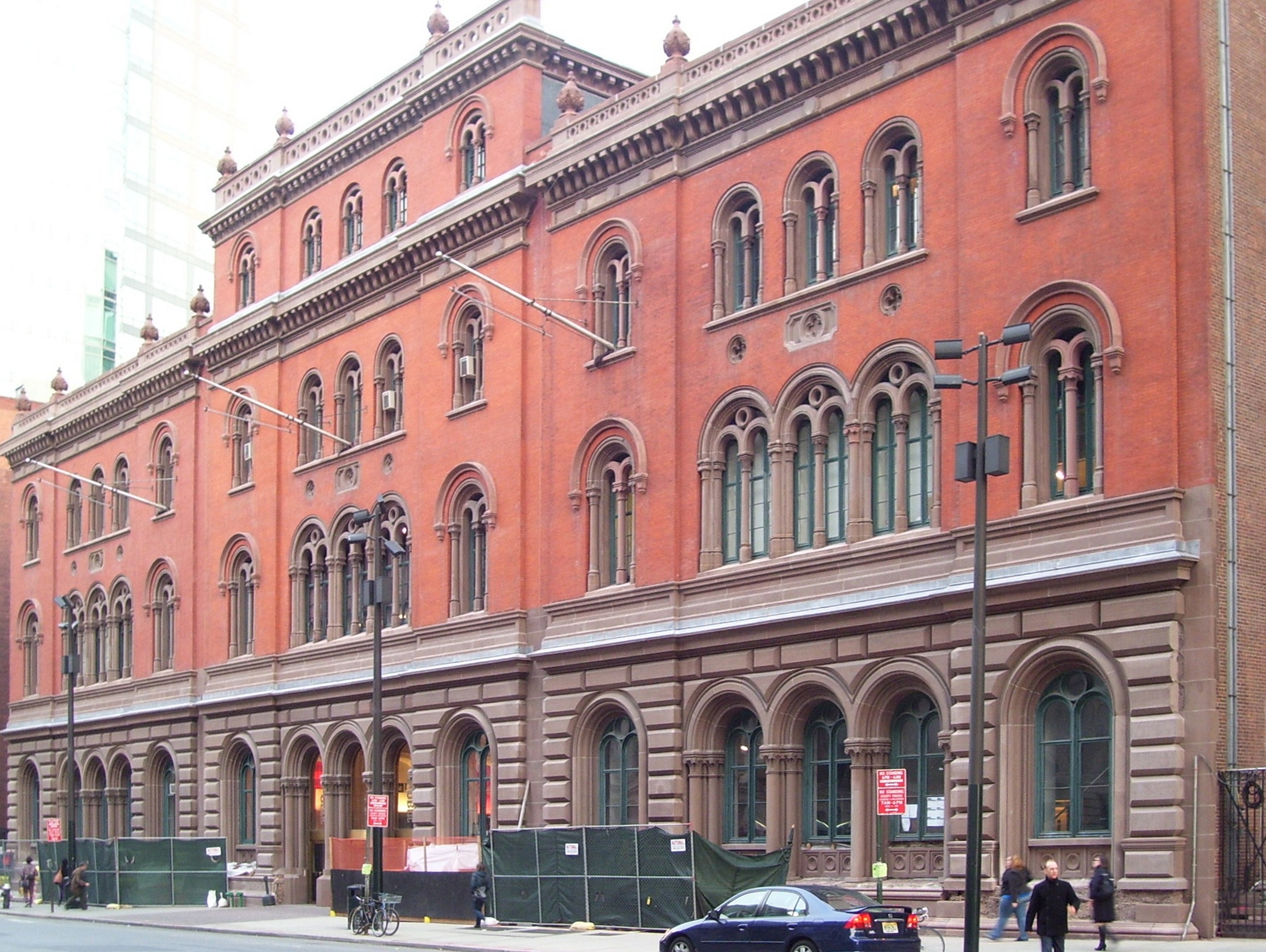
The Astor Library, restored to house the Public Theater

=== Public Theater ===
Cavaglieri continued his preservationist work with the restoration of the Alexander Saeltzer-designed Astor Library at 425 Lafayette Street, a building that was saved from demolition by the Landmarks Preservation Commission. The commission was to restore and convert the building to house the Public Theater (then known as the New York Shakespeare Festival) under the direction of Joe Papp and with consultation from set designer Ming Cho Lee. He was recommended for the job by architecture critic Ada Louise Huxtable, who praised his work on the Jefferson Market Library. The Public Theater was one of the first historic buildings adapted for new use under the 1965 New York City Landmarks Law.

Papp's original plan to build one 1,200 seat central theater in the old building turned out to require costly alterations to original masonry walls, so the design was adapted to two 229-seat theaters. The main theater, a thrust-style space called the Anspacher, was built in what had been the library's reading room. Cavaglieri's design incorporated original architectural details, like Corinthian columns, into a very up-to-date design. The second theater, the Newman, was built in the former basement and ground floor.

Cavaglieri also restored the Delacorte Theater in Central Park under the aegis of the Public Theater, then known as the New York Shakespeare Festival.

== Honors and legacy ==
During his lifetime, Cavaglieri served as chairman of the Board of Trustees of the National Institute of Architectural Education and president of the New York-area chapter of the American Institute of Architects. In 1970, he was elected into the National Academy of Design as an Associate member, and became a full member in 1984. He was President of the Fine Arts Federation from 1972 to 1974.

Cavaglieri was honored with the Lucy G. Moses Preservation Leadership Award given by the New York Landmarks Conservancy in 2002. He continued working in the same studio he'd set up in 1946 until shortly before his death, only retiring from architectural practice and preservation advocacy at the age of 93.

His legacy of mixing contemporary style with careful preservation can be seen in major restoration projects in New York City, including the High Line's transformation into an elevated park.

== Archives ==
Cavaglieri's architectural drawings and professional papers are held by the Department of Drawings & Archives at the Avery Architectural and Fine Arts Library at Columbia University in New York City.
