= New York Women's House of Detention =

Former women's prison in Manhattan, New York

Coordinates: 40°44′03″N 73°59′58″W

- Interactive map of New York Women's House of Detention
- Location: Greenwich Village, New York
- Status: Closed
- Opened: 1932
- Closed: 1974

The New York Women's House of Detention, often referred to as the "House of D", was a women's prison in Manhattan, New York City from 1932 to 1974.

Built on the site of the Jefferson Market Prison that had succeeded the Jefferson Market in Manhattan's Greenwich Village, the New York Women's House of Detention is believed to have been the world's only Art Deco prison. It was designed by Sloan & Robertson in 1931 at a cost of $2,000,000 and opened to the public by Richard C. Patterson, Jr. on March 29, 1932. It did not receive its first inmates until some time later.

The prison's central location at 10 Greenwich Avenue gave the female inmates an opportunity to see below to the crowded street and attempt to communicate with people walking by. After the prison was officially closed on June 13, 1971, Mayor Lindsay began the demolition of the prison in 1973, and it was completed the following year. The Jefferson Market Garden, now on the site, has a historical marker recognizing the site's history.

Ruth E. Collins was the first superintendent at the prison. She embraced the design of the prison, labeling it "a new era in penology". Her mission was to affect the moral and social rehabilitation of the women in her charge, giving them a chance for "restoration as well as for punishment". She commissioned a number of art works as part of her mission to uplift the women and treat them all as individuals. However, reports noted that due to low budgeting allowances, the staffing model perpetuated under Collins encouraged corruption among the correctional officers, doctors, and other staff on-site, as wages were low and training was not sufficient.

Among the most notable individuals who were incarcerated within the Women's House of Detention's were:

- Polly Adler
- Jane Alpert
- Angela Davis
- Dorothy Day
- Andrea Dworkin
- Miriam Moskowitz
- Ethel Rosenberg
- Afeni Shakur
- Judith Malina

In its later years, allegations of racial discrimination, abuse and mistreatment dogged the prison. Angela Davis has been outspoken about the treatment she witnessed. Andrea Dworkin's testimony of her assault by two of the prison's doctors led to its eventual closing. Audre Lorde described the House of Detention as, "a defiant pocket of female resistance, ever-present as a reminder of possibility, as well as punishment."

In 2022, the historian Hugh Ryan published a history of the prison called The Women's House of Detention: A Queer History of a Forgotten Prison. The book describes the frequent arrest and high rate of incarceration based on low-level crimes of loitering, vagrancy, drug possession, and prostitution often disproportionately charged against poor, transgender and queer women through discriminatory policing practices. The House of D was historically a site of violence for the queer community, with the prison notoriously violating the bodily autonomy of those incarcerated through employing corporal punishment and invasive examinations.

Ryan additionally characterizes the House of D as a historical landmark in the Greenwich Village beyond the queer community. He writes, "It was one of the Village's most famous landmarks: a meeting place for locals and a must-see site for adventurous tourists. And for tens of thousands of arrested women and transmasculine people from every corner of the city, the House of D was a nexus, drawing the threads of their lives together in its dark and fearsome cells."

== Pop culture ==
Hellhole: The Shocking Story of the Inmates and Life in the New York House of Detention for Women, published in 1967 by Sara Harris, recounts her time as a social worker in the prison, and the shocking scenes she witnessed.

Jerry Herman's Off-Broadway musical, Parade, opened in 1960 and featured a song called "Save the Village", originally entitled “Don’t Tear Down the House of Detention.” Melvin Van Peebles' musical, Ain't Supposed to Die a Natural Death, which opened on Broadway in 1972 features a song, "10th and Greenwich" and is considered the first lesbian love song in Broadway history.

The prison featured prominently in the 2004 film House of D.
