= Columbus Citizens Foundation =

U.S. non-profit organization

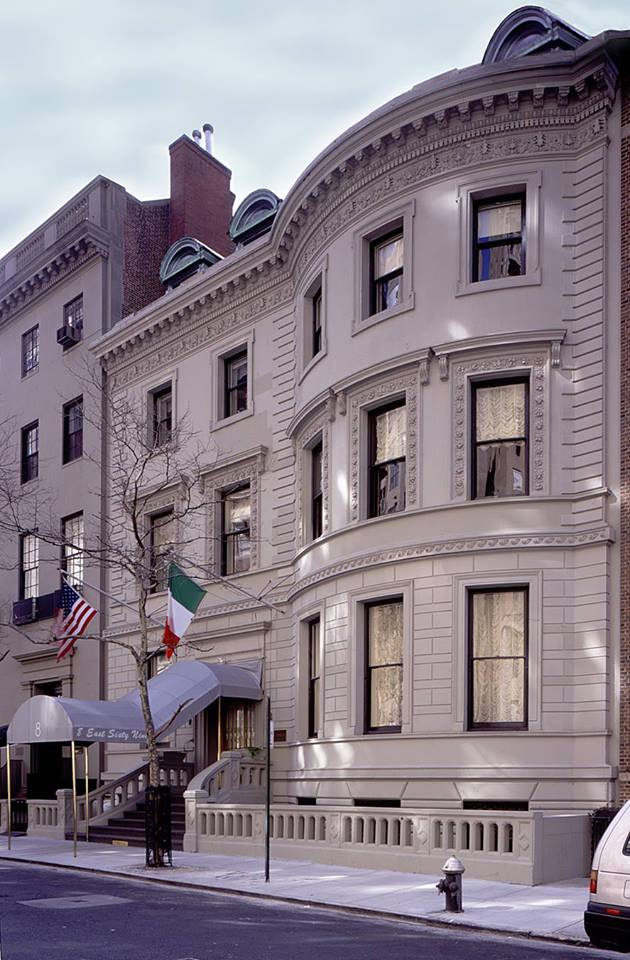
Columbus Citizens Foundation headquarters, located in Manhattan's Upper East Side

The Columbus Citizens Foundation is a non-profit organization in New York City committed to fostering an appreciation of Italian-American heritage and achievement. The Foundation, through a range of philanthropic and cultural activities, provides opportunities for advancement to Italian-American students through various scholarship and grant programs.

The Foundation organizes New York City's annual Columbus Celebration and Columbus Day Parade, which has celebrated Italian-American heritage on New York's Fifth Avenue since 1929, but the Columbus Day Parade started officially in 1945. In 2024 was the 80th year of celebration.

== History ==
Founded by Judge S. Samuel Di Falco and Generoso Pope in 1944, the Foundation was established to memorialize and foster the contributions that their Italian forefathers brought to the United States.

The building was designed by Boston architectural firm Peabody & Stearns and completed in 1893 for Charles L. Colby, one of the wealthiest men in New York City. A close friend of John D. Rockefeller Sr., Colby oversaw Rockefellers' extensive railroad interests and sat on the board of directors of the Northern Pacific Railroad, among others. In 1967 the Swedish Consul General sold the property to the Foundation.

== Philanthropic achievements ==
The Columbus Citizens Foundation's primary activity is awarding scholarships to students of Italian heritage. In addition to its scholarship activities, the Foundation has a tradition of raising funds for specific projects, often humanitarian in nature.

== Columbus Day Parade ==
The Columbus Citizens Foundation oversees and executes New York's Annual Columbus Day Parade on Fifth Avenue which features over 40,000 participants and over one million spectators.

Former Grand Marshals of the Columbus Day Parade include: Maria Bartiromo; Antonin Scalia; Mario Andretti; Joe DiMaggio and Sophia Loren.

== Membership ==
At present, the Foundation's Membership includes over 550 men and women of Italian heritage representing the fields of law, medicine, government, business, education, and the arts.
