= Jefferson Market Prison =

Former prison in New York City

Coordinates: 40.7345°N 73.9996°W

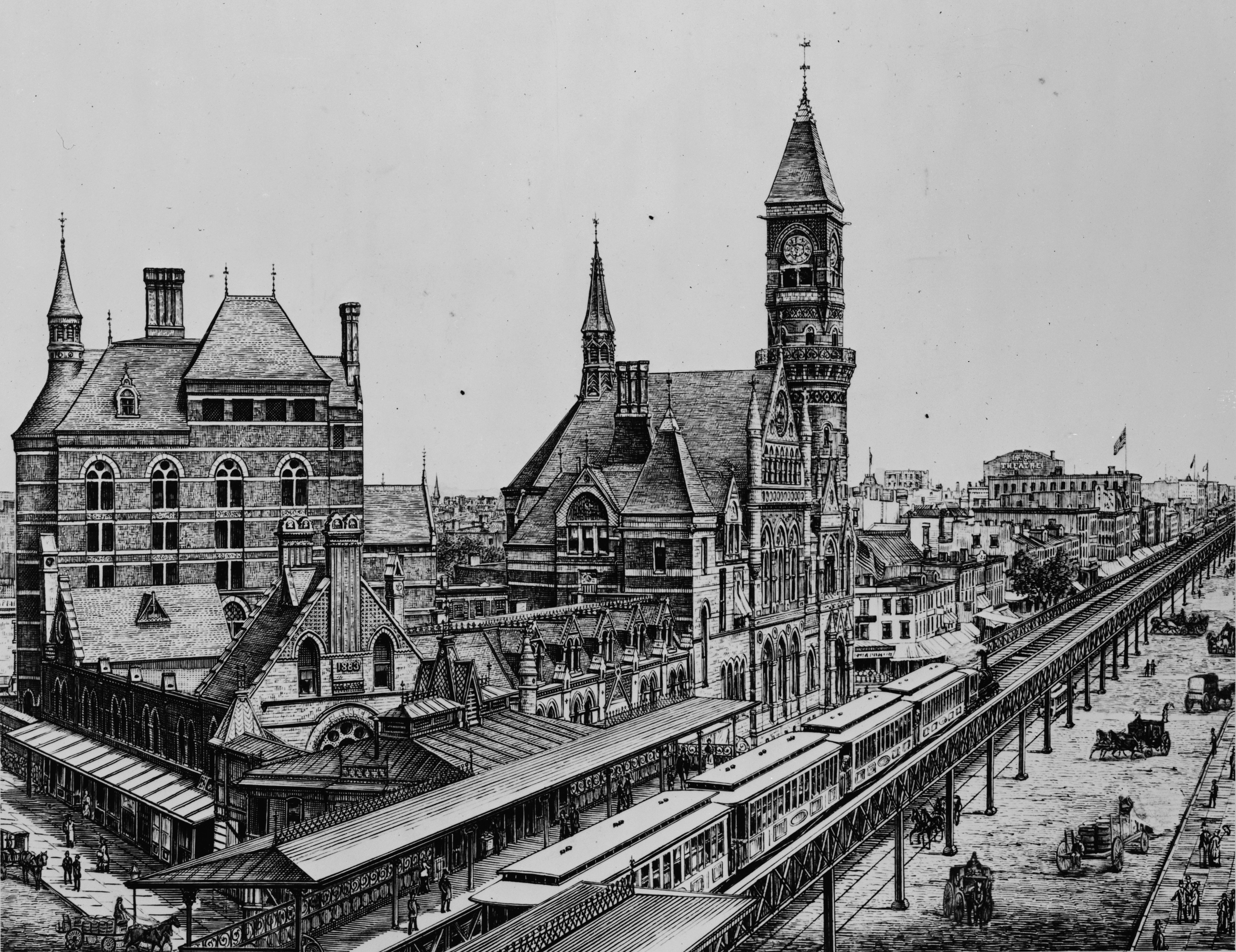
The now-demolished prison on the left next to the extant courthouse on the right with the Sixth Avenue El in front

The Jefferson Market Prison was a prison in New York City at 10 Greenwich Avenue that opened in 1877, together with the adjacent Third Judicial District Courthouse. Frederick Clarke Withers designed these twin buildings in an ornate American Gothic style. The landmark courthouse survived Jefferson Market's 1927 demolition and today serves as a New York Public Library branch.

Originally a jailhouse was built at this site alongside a police court and volunteer firehouse in the 1833 Jefferson food market, named for the former president. The jail was torn down in 1873.

A third building—the only Art Deco jail ever built—operated here from 1931 to 1971 as New York Women's House of Detention.

The site is now a small park known as Jefferson Market Garden, with a historical marker recognizing the site's history. .
