= Maria Bartiromo =

American television personality and author

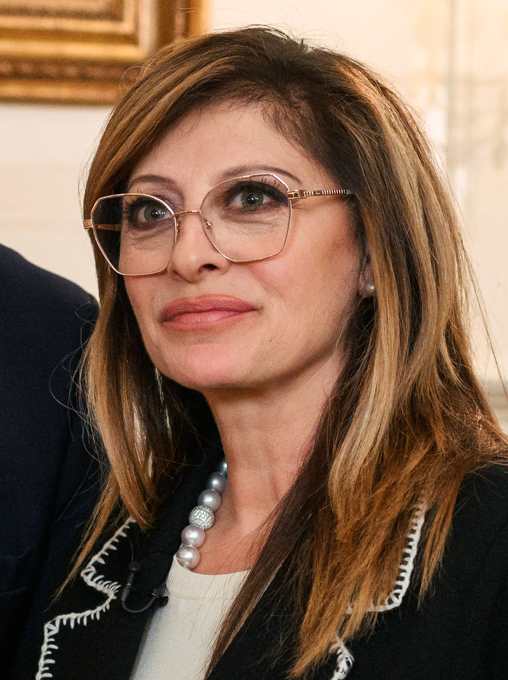
- Bartiromo in 2026
- Born: Maria Sara Bartiromo; September 11, 1967 (age 59); New York City, U.S.
- Education: Long Island University, Post; New York University (BA)
- Occupations: Financial journalist; television personality; columnist; news anchor
- Years active: 1988-present
- Spouse: Jonathan Steinberg (m. 1999)
- Relatives: Saul Steinberg (father-in-law)
- Website: bartiromo.com

Maria Sara Bartiromo (born September 11, 1967) is an American conservative journalist and author who has also worked as a financial reporter and news anchor. She was the host of Mornings with Maria and Maria Bartiromo's Wall Street on the Fox Business channel, and Sunday Morning Futures With Maria Bartiromo on the Fox News channel until her firing in 2026.

Bartiromo worked at CNN as a producer for five years before joining CNBC in 1993, where she worked on-air for 20 years. With CNBC, she was the host of Closing Bell and On the Money with Maria Bartiromo. She was the first television journalist to deliver live television reports from the floor of the New York Stock Exchange. She has won several awards for her work on these programs, including two Emmy Awards. Nicknamed the "Money Honey", she garnered considerable attention within the financial industry in addition to the media. Her work for CNBC was largely non-political in its subject matter and approach.

In 2013, she left CNBC to host shows for Fox, starting in January 2014. During the first presidency of Donald Trump, she became an advocate for the Trump administration, giving him frequent unchallenging interviews. She is one of three Fox program hosts named in a $2.7 billion defamation lawsuit by Smartmatic relating to unproven conspiracy theories used in attempts to overturn the 2020 United States presidential election. As of April 2023, the lawsuit was in the discovery phase. Bartiromo was among the hosts named in the Dominion Voting Systems v. Fox News Network defamation lawsuit for broadcasting false statements about the plaintiff company's voting machines that Fox News settled for $787.5 million and required Fox News to acknowledge that the broadcast statements were false.

== Early life and education ==
Bartiromo was born to Italian-American parents Vincent and Josephine Bartiromo, and was raised in the Dyker Heights area of Brooklyn in New York City. Her father owned the Rex Manor restaurant in Brooklyn, and her mother served as the hostess. Her mother also worked as a clerk at an off-track betting parlor. Her mother's family was from Agrigento, Sicily. Her grandfather Carmine Bartiromo immigrated to the United States from Nocera, Campania in 1933, settling in New York and serving in the U.S. Armed Forces.

Bartiromo attended Fontbonne Hall Academy, an all-girls private Catholic school in Bay Ridge. During this time, she worked at the coat check at her father's restaurant and as a stock clerk at a wedding dress shop. She was fired from the latter for trying on newly arrived dresses before putting them away; she recalled "I cried the whole way home, but I learned a valuable lesson and that is – do your job."

Bartiromo started college at C.W. Post before transferring to New York University. During her college years, she worked at the same betting parlor where her mother worked. She graduated from NYU's Washington Square Campus in 1989 with a Bachelor of Arts in journalism and economics.

While at NYU, she became involved with radio, interning on Barry Farber's show on WMCA 570. Farber was impressed by her willingness and capability in doing behind-the-scenes tasks associated with the role. Following that, she interned at CNN.

== Career ==
=== CNN ===
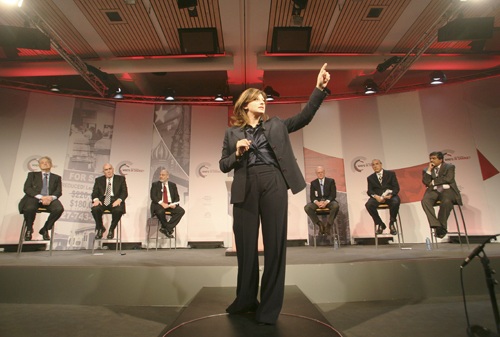
Bartiromo at the World Economic Forum in Davos in 2008

After her internship, which began in 1988 or 1989, Bartiromo spent five years as an executive producer and assignment editor with CNN Business. Her supervisor at CNN was Lou Dobbs, who later became a colleague at Fox Business. She also worked as a production assistant for Stuart Varney there.

=== CNBC ===
==== Live from the stock exchange floor ====
In 1993, Bartiromo was hired by executive Roger Ailes to replace analyst Roy Blumberg at CNBC, and began reporting live from the floor of the New York Stock Exchange, as well as hosting and contributing to the Market Watch and Squawk Box segments. Bartiromo became the first journalist to deliver live television reports from the raucous floor of New York Stock Exchange. The Guardian newspaper described the scene as, "viewers could watch Bartiromo amid the tumult on the floor of the New York Stock Exchange, straining her voice to be heard as she delivered reports to camera ..., her 5ft 5in frame [1.65m] often jostled by burly traders." She has said of that innovation: "I got bumped around a little, but it was very exciting — a new, instantaneous way of reporting market news. We immediately had a big following."

Bartiromo was the anchor and managing editor of the CNBC business interview show On the Money with Maria Bartiromo (called The Wall Street Journal Report during much of this time). Beginning in 2007, she hosted The Business of Innovation. She hosted several other programs, including Closing Bell (2002–2013), Market Wrap (1998–2000), and Business Center (1997–1999). She became known for the ability to get CEOs of companies in the news to come on her show for an interview. She became influential.

==== "Money Honey" ====
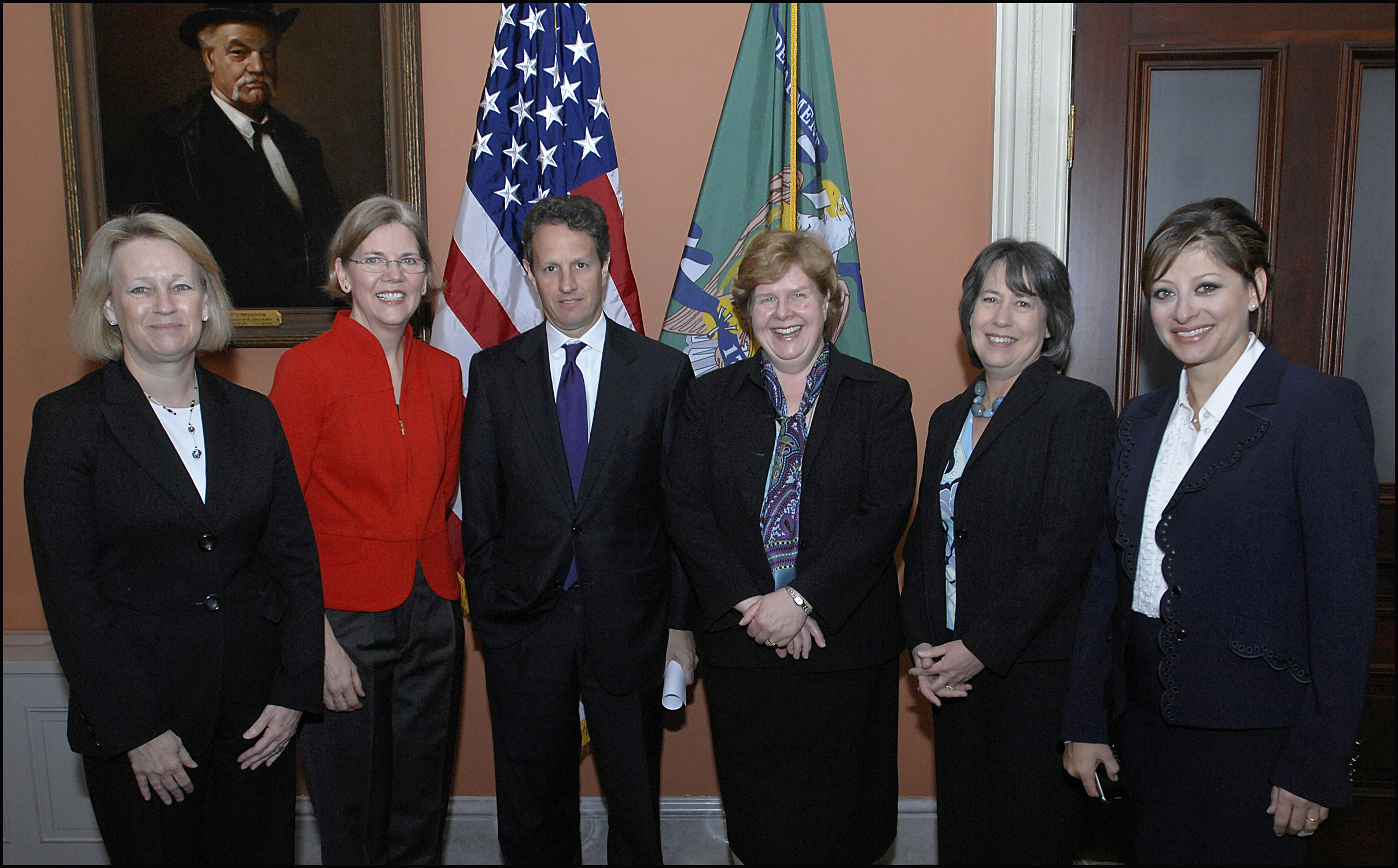
Mary Schapiro, Elizabeth Warren, Tim Geithner, Christina Romer, Sheila Bair, and Maria Bartiromo

Bartiromo appeared on television shows such as NBC Universal's The Tonight Show with Jay Leno and Late Night with Conan O'Brien, CBS Television Distribution's The Oprah Winfrey Show, HBO's Real Time with Bill Maher, Warner Bros. Television's short-lived The Caroline Rhea Show, CNBC's even shorter-existing McEnroe, and Comedy Central's The Colbert Report, as well as guest-hosting on the syndicated Live with Regis and Kelly.

Over the years, writers for multiple media outlets have commented on her good looks and likened her appearance to that of the Italian actress Sophia Loren. It is a comparison that Bartiromo has acknowledged and welcomed as a compliment.

Bartiromo was nicknamed the "Money Honey" in the mid-to-late 1990s, a moniker that she had conflicted feelings about lest it diminish her credibility as a financial journalist. In January 2007, Bartiromo filed trademark applications to use the term "Money Honey" as a brand name for a line of children's products, including toys, puzzles and coloring books, to teach kids about money. By some accounts she later let the trademarks expire.

==== Continued prominence ====
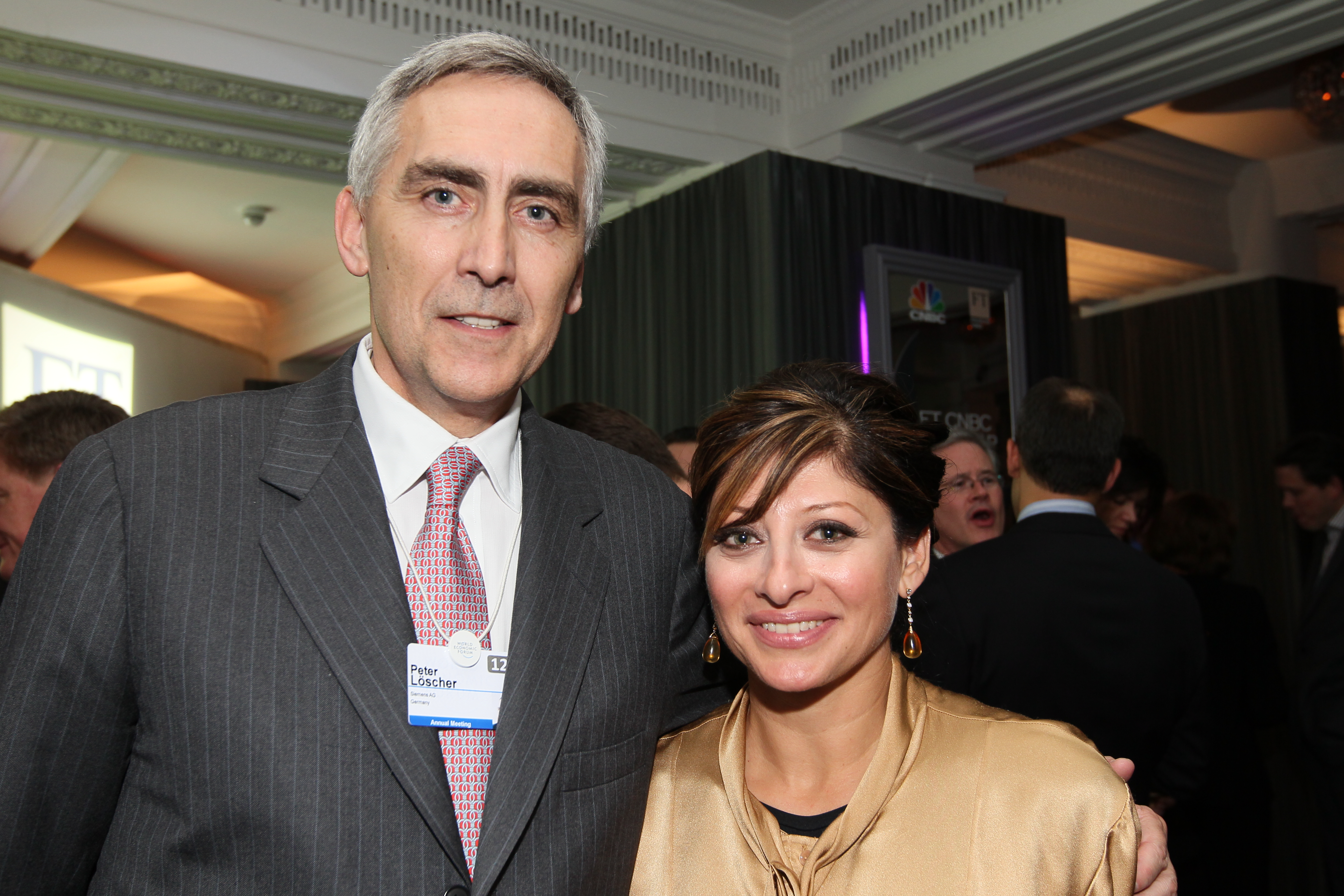
Peter Löscher and Maria Bartiromo

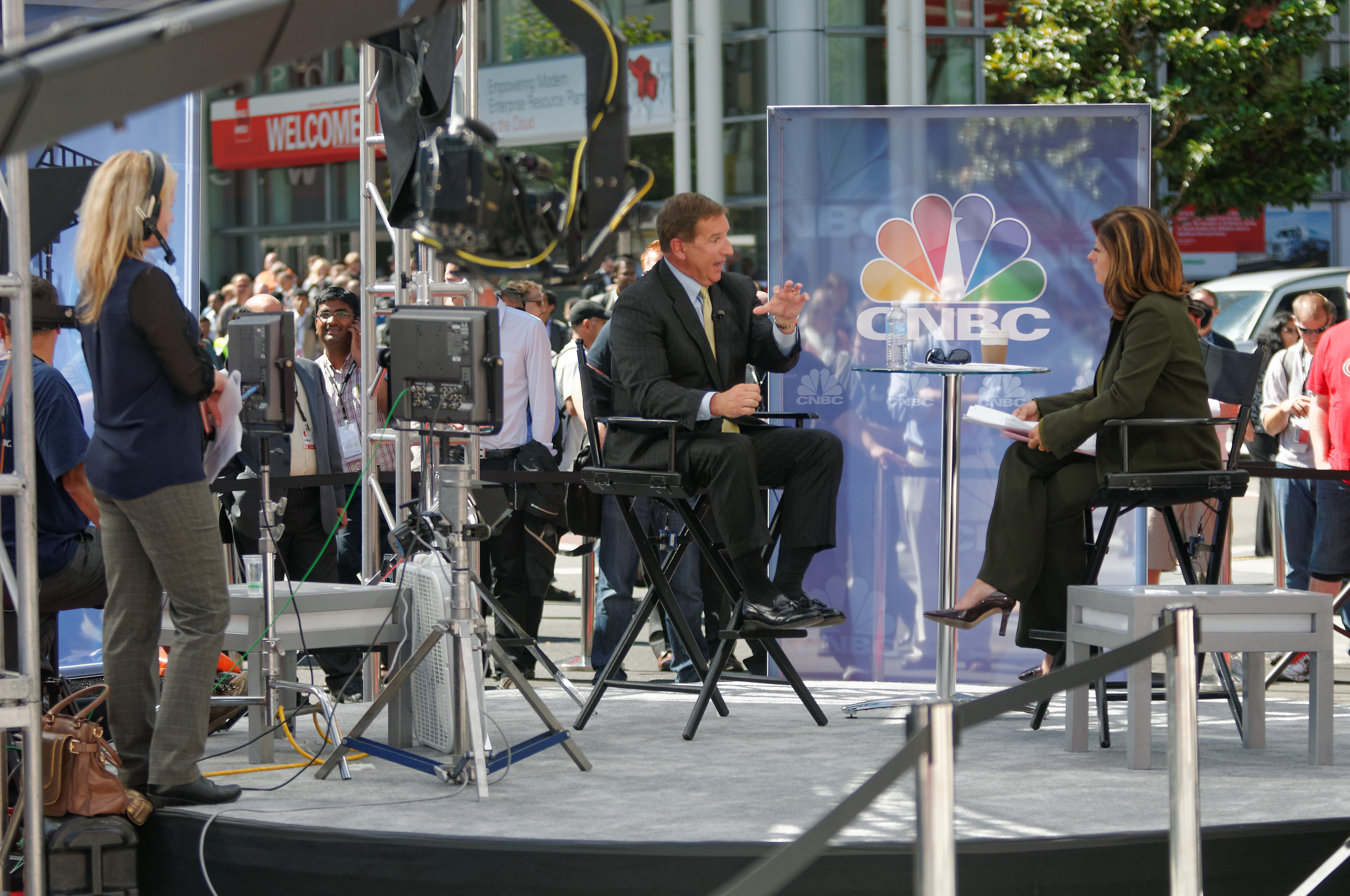
Bartiromo interviewing Mark Hurd in 2013

Bartiromo anchored the television coverage of New York City's Columbus Day Parade beginning in 1995 and was the grand marshal in 2010.

In 2006–07 there was controversy over Bartiromo possibly being too close socially to some of the executives she was covering, which included overseas trips with some such sources. In part, that was part and parcel of her role to add "pizazz and drama". As The New York Times wrote, "in her years as CNBC's most recognizable face, [she] has lent to the reporting of once gray business news a veneer of gloss and celebrity." But the Times noted that: "Typically, Ms. Bartiromo's interviewing style can be probing, aggressive and, her special access notwithstanding, she can make even some of her best sources sweat a bit on camera." CNBC defended her on the matter, saying that the trips in question were properly approved and that "her journalistic integrity was never compromised", and Bartiromo retained the confidence of NBC upper management.

Following the 2008 financial crisis, which featured the collapse of some Wall Street firms and the federal bailouts of others, Bartiromo commented in an interview: "I'm a free-market capitalist who would like to think that the market can correct itself. Unfortunately, the structures we have in place dropped the ball. The boards of directors were asleep at the wheel. So were the regulators. I believe that so-called independent boards of directors should be held accountable for their firms, too. Wall Street today faces the wrath of their shareholders and the scorn of the public. There's got to be substantial change from within to regain public trust."

Bartiromo signed a new five-year contract with CNBC in late 2008 (equivalent to $5,864,000 in 2025). Her salary there was around $4 million a year. Former colleague Dylan Ratigan has said that Bartiromo "is a generational icon for financial television. Full stop."

=== Fox Business and Fox News ===
==== Early years and ratings ====
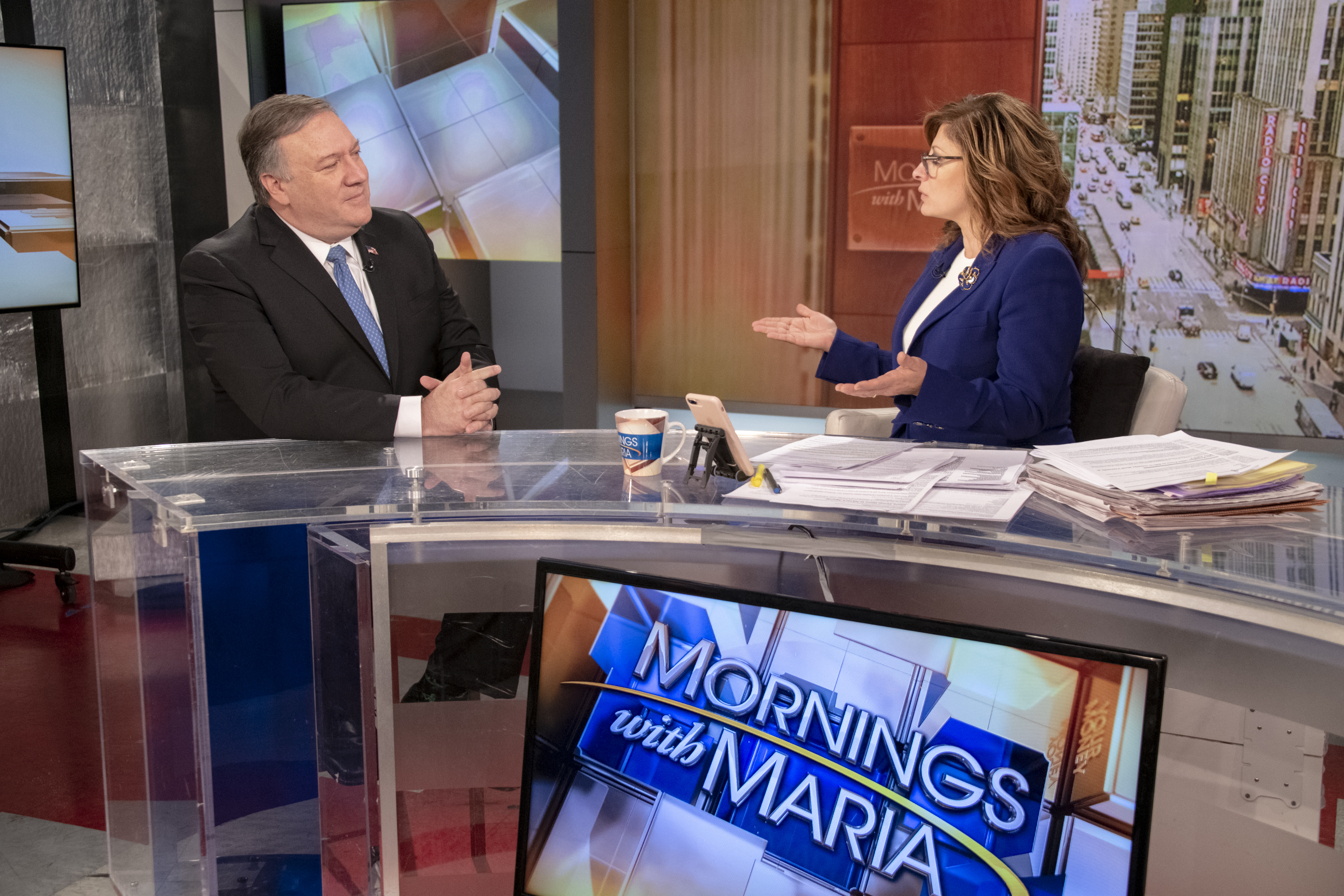
Bartiromo interviewing Secretary of State Mike Pompeo on her Fox Business program in 2019

On November 18, 2013, it was announced that Bartiromo was leaving CNBC to join Fox Business (FBN). According to the Drudge Report, her deal with Fox Business called for her to anchor a daily market hours program and to have a role on Fox News as well. Her first show with Fox Business was Opening Bell with Maria Bartiromo. She expanded the subject domains she covered to include not just the stock market but also larger questions of public policy and the overall economy.

Since her time with the Fox Business channel, the ratings for her show began to surge when she became an important news source for Trump supporters.

==== Presidential debate host ====
The developments of the 2016 Republican presidential nomination race benefited her ratings, as she developed an on-air relationship with Trump.

In regard to the 2016 Republican Party presidential debates and forums, she was one of three moderators for Fox Business of the debate of November 10, 2015, at the Milwaukee Theatre and she and her colleagues were credited with keeping a focus on economics and for overseeing a largely civil discussion among the candidates. She even drew some boos from the audience for suggesting that likely Democratic nominee Hillary Clinton had much more relevant experience than the candidates on stage. She then co-hosted on Fox Business another Republican debate, this time on January 14, 2016, in the North Charleston Coliseum, one that was not previously planned but awarded on the basis of the first performance. One assessment of the North Charleston debate was that the moderators were initially mild but got tougher as the debate went on and delved more into economic matters.

During the 2016 general election, she commented on the differing ways that Wall Street would react to either candidate winning. She received a good deal of attention during this period for her sartorial choices for the traditional Al Smith Dinner. But as the election ran on towards its conclusion, Bartiromo took an increasingly sharp pro-Trump stance, such as repeating trolling Internet posts attacking Clinton.

==== Donald Trump presidency ====
After Trump became president in 2017, she became an advocate for the Trump administration. She also gave friendly, non-challenging softball interviews to Trump and amplified Trump administration conspiracy theories and falsehoods. In her Trump interviews, she expressed agreement with and did not question Trump's claims, many of which had been debunked as false or unsubstantiated. Making reference to allegations that Trump's predecessor, Barack Obama, used the U.S. intelligence community to spy on the Trump campaign and transition, Bartiromo said that 2016 requests by Obama administration officials to unmask the identity of an American who was the subject of a counterintelligence operation (who turned out to be Trump associate Michael Flynn) was "the biggest political scandal we've ever seen." Attorney general Bill Barr named federal prosecutor John Bash to lead an investigation, which concluded months later with no findings of substantive wrongdoing and no public report.

In late November 2020, after Trump lost his bid for reelection, Bartiromo conducted the first post-election interview with Trump. Before the interview, Bartiromo texted Mark Meadows, then Trump's chief of staff, with advice that included questions she planned to ask Trump. In the interview, she backed Trump's false claims of election fraud and his attempt to overturn the election results, claiming that Trump was being overthrown in a "coup". Bartiromo was criticized for her conduct in the 45-minute interview, in which she never asked Trump to substantiate his claims of fraud. Brian Stelter of CNN contrasted his recall of Bartiromo's earlier career to his perception of her time spent interviewing Trump as "Maria Bartiromo, once a feared and acclaimed journalist, best known for working the floor of the New York Stock Exchange, forcing CEOs to tell the truth, now sits behind a desk and invites the president to lie and lie and lie." Trump praised Bartiromo as being "brave" for her approach to discussing the disputes. Bartiromo then defended herself by claiming that much of the media, such as CNN and The New York Times, were taking a side and engaging in "election interference". In his November 2021 book, Betrayal, former ABC News chief White House correspondent Jonathan Karl reported a November 2020 incident when Bartiromo called attorney general Bill Barr "to complain that the DOJ hadn't done anything to stop the Democrats from stealing the election." Barr told Karl, "She called me up and she was screaming. I yelled back at her. She's lost it."

==== Promoter of "election fraud" falsehoods ====
According to media reporter Brian Stelter, Bartiromo's unsourced and poorly sourced on-air conversation with Sidney Powell on November 8, 2020, largely started the network's false and potentially defamatory claims about the election, which Trump lost—Bartiromo did no fact checking, no push back, nor even ask for evidence, merely repeating "unhinged" and false claims. Bartiromo was an outspoken proponent on her program of baseless allegations that rigged voting machines stole the election from Donald Trump. Hosts Lou Dobbs and Jeanine Pirro also promoted the falsehoods on their programs. Attorneys for Smartmatic, a voting machine company that had been baselessly accused of conspiring with competitor Dominion Voting Systems to rig the election, sent Fox News a letter in December 2020 threatening legal action and demanding retractions that "must be published on multiple occasions" so as to "match the attention and audience targeted with the original defamatory publications." The three programs each ran the same three-minute video segment refuting the baseless allegations days later, consisting of an election security expert being interviewed by an unseen and unidentified man, though none of the three hosts personally issued retractions. In February 2021, Smartmatic filed a $2.7 billion defamation suit against Fox News, three of its hosts, including Bartiromo, and two network guests. A New York State Supreme Court judge ruled in March 2022 that the suit against Fox News could proceed, dismissing allegations against two individuals but allowing claims against Bartiromo to stand.

In January 2021, after the storming of the U.S. Capitol that was carried out by a mob of supporters of Trump, Bartiromo hosted Trump economic advisor Peter Navarro on her show, where he falsely claimed in the interview that Trump had won the election. Bartiromo concurred, falsely claiming, "We know that there were irregularities in this election." In a broadcast on January 19, she falsely claimed that Democrats wore MAGA clothing and were behind the storming of the Capitol. In July 2021, Bartiromo referenced Ashli Babbitt, who was shot while part of a pro-Trump mob trying to push through a barricaded door inside the U.S. Capitol building, a "wonderful woman" who "went to peaceful protest."

In October 2024, Bartiromo promoted a story from The Gateway Pundit, a far-right fake news website, claiming that Arizona Secretary of State Adrian Fontes was trying to "hide" an "election integrity problem" in Arizona.

==== Ratings success ====
Five years after joining the fledgling network, both her shows and the channel itself was surpassing CNBC in audience size some of the time. In September 2019, she signed a new multi-year deal with FBN. That year, TheStreet.com reported that Bartiromo had an annual salary of $10 million, seventh highest among American television news anchors of any kind.

During the latter part of January 2021, at the outset of the Biden administration, Fox News gave Bartiromo a trial run to head one of Fox News' primetime slots, the new weekday 7 p.m. Fox News Primetime political opinions show. Her guest hosting stint began the week of January 25, 2021. She did not get the time slot.

==== Dismissal from Fox News ====
On September 3, 2026, Fox News Media announced it had parted ways with Bartiromo, effective immediately, after more than twelve years at the network. The company did not give a reason for the departure. Its statement read, "Effective today, Maria Bartiromo is no longer with Fox News Media", and thanked her "for her work over the last 12½ years". According to sources interviewed by The New York Times, her "departure was Fox's decision". The Times also noted she was the focal point of two major defamation lawsuits against Fox, one of which was still ongoing at the time of her departure. Her Fox Business program, Mornings with Maria, was renamed Mornings with Fox Business and given a rotating cast of hosts; the network said a replacement host for Sunday Morning Futures would be named later. Her last day on the air was August 9.

Oliver Darcy later wrote that Bartiromo and her producer Patrick Ignozzi were both dismissed from the network. The dismissal reportedly came after the network learned Bartiromo shared confidential editorial guidance from Fox Business executives, which instructed her to not give credibility to Trump's false claims that the 2020 presidential election was stolen, with members of the Trump administration.

=== Books and other publications ===
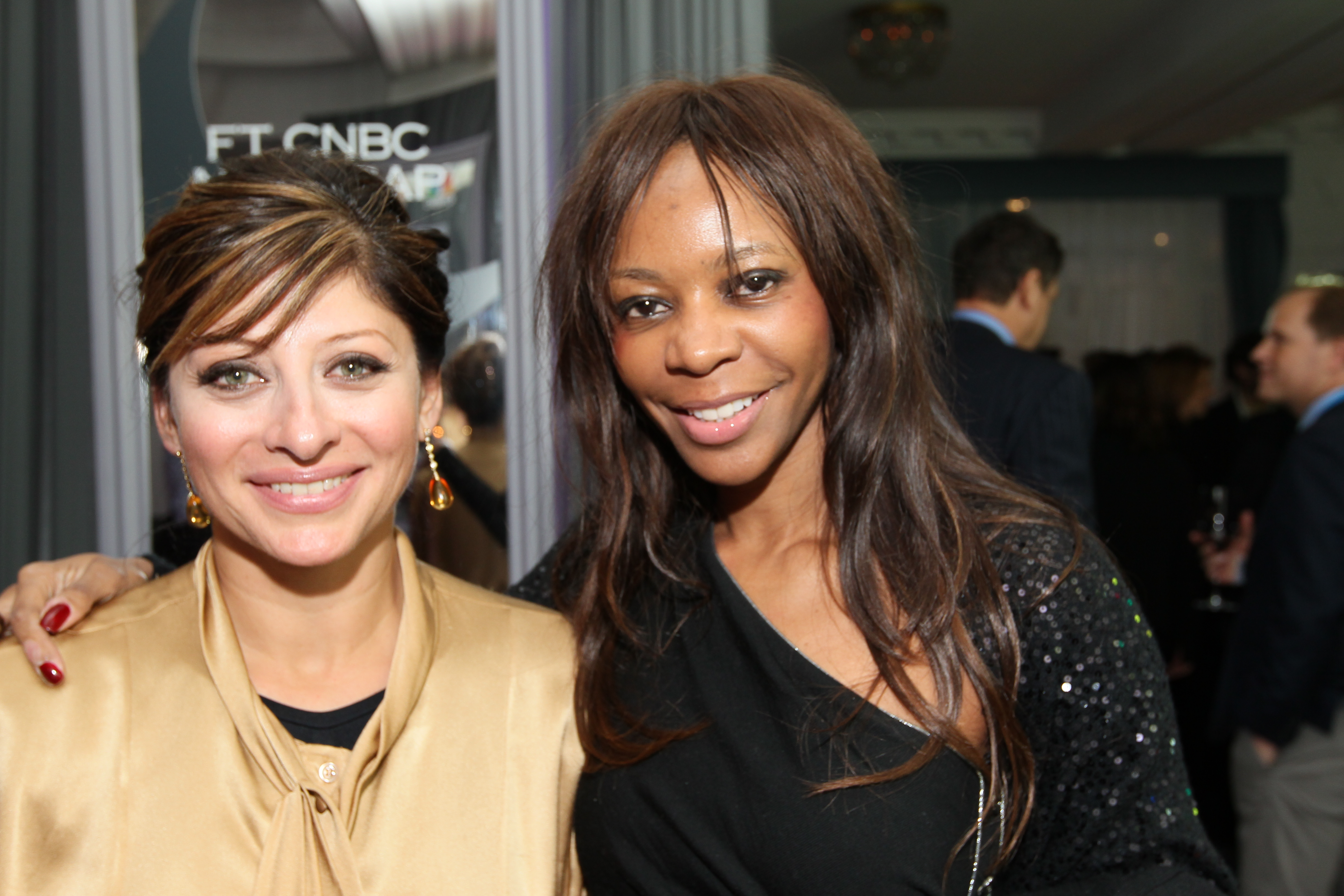
Bartiromo in 2012 with Zambian economist Dambisa Moyo

Bartiromo is the author of several books. Her first was Use the News: How to Separate the Noise from the Investment Nuggets and Make Money in Any Economy (HarperCollins, 2001). Her next two books were The 10 Laws of Enduring Success (Crown Business, 2010) and The Weekend That Changed Wall Street (Portfolio Hardcover, 2011). A fourth book, of which she held the status of co-author along with James Freeman, was titled The Cost: Trump, China, and American Renewal (Simon & Schuster, 2020).

=== Awards, honors and memberships ===
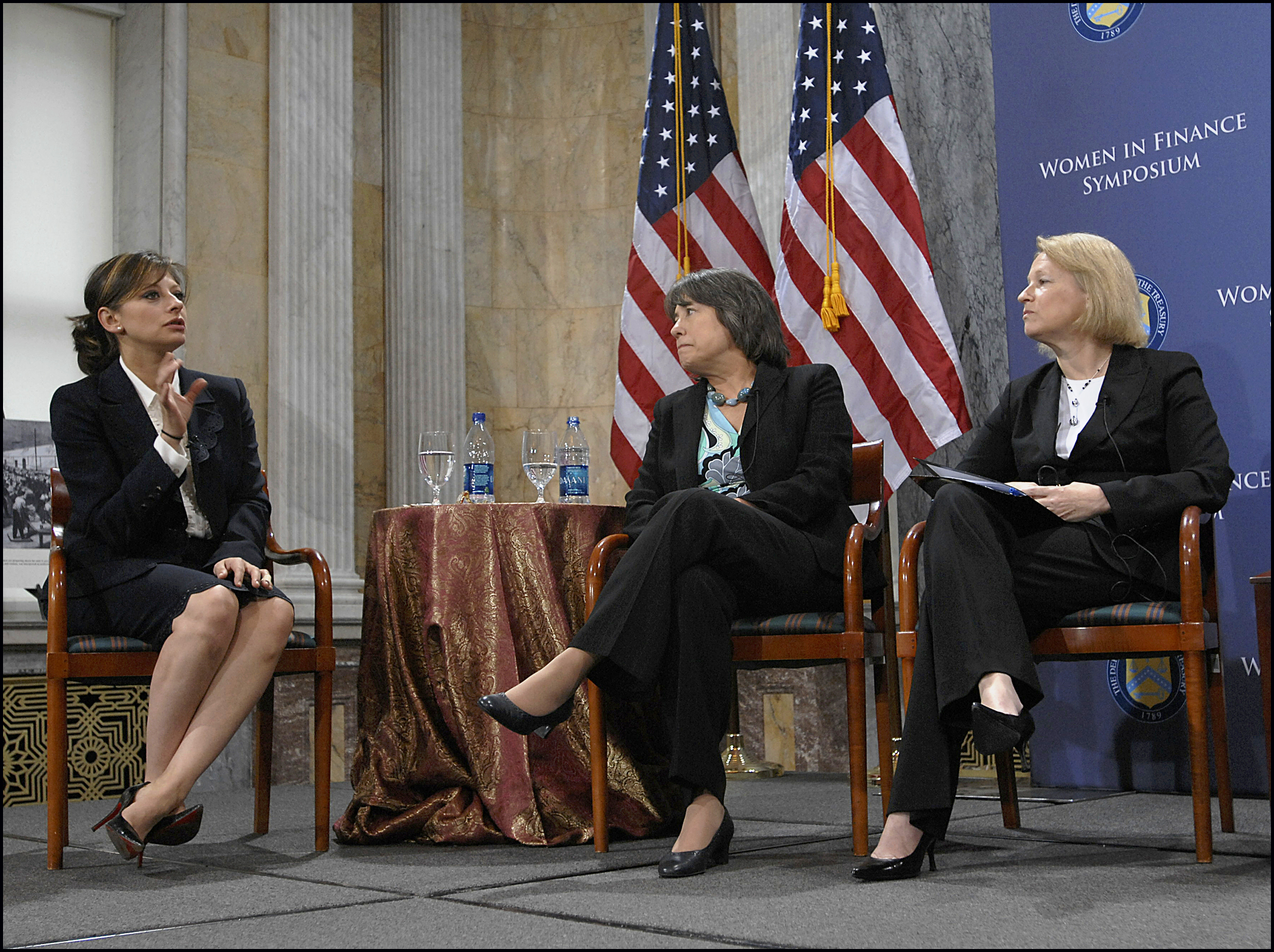
Bartiromo (left) at the Women in Finance Symposium 2010

Bartiromo is the recipient of an Excellence in Broadcast Journalism Award (1997); a Lincoln Statue Award presented by the Union League of Philadelphia (2004); a Gracie Award, for Outstanding Documentary (2008); and two Emmy Awards, an Emmy Award for Outstanding Coverage of a Breaking News Story (2008) and an Emmy Award for Outstanding Business and Economic Reporting (2009).

In 2009, the Financial Times listed Bartiromo as one of "50 Faces That Shaped the Decade". In 2011, she was the third journalist to be inducted into the Cable Hall of Fame. In 2016, she was inducted into the Library of American Broadcasting.

The Maria Bartiromo Broadcast Journalism Studio at Fontbonne Hall Academy, the high school she attended, is named after her. She was the keynote speaker for Fontbonne's 80th anniversary gala in 2018.

Bartiromo is on board of trustees of New York University, her alma mater. She gave the commencement speech at the NYU Stern School of Business in 2012. She has also taught there, acting as an adjunct professor at the Stern School from 2010 to 2013. The seminar that she co-taught in fall 2010, titled "Global Markets and Normative Frameworks", filled its registration in 10 minutes.

She has been on the board of trustees for the New York City Ballet. She is a member of the Council on Foreign Relations and the Economic Club of New York. She has been on the board of the Girl Scout Council of Greater New York, Public Education Needs Civic Involvement and Leadership (PENCIL) in New York, and the Young Global Leaders of the World Economic Forum. She is a member of the board of governors of the Columbus Citizens Foundation, and in 2010 was the grand marshal of the Columbus Day Parade.

== Personal life ==
In 1999, Bartiromo married Jonathan Steinberg, chief executive officer of WisdomTree Investments and son of billionaire financier Saul Steinberg. They first met in 1990, soon after her college graduation. The ceremony was held at the home of the bridegroom and was officiated by a rabbi.

The couple own a beach house in the hamlet of Westhampton, New York. They have also lived in a five-story townhouse on Manhattan's Upper East Side.

== In popular culture ==
Bartiromo appeared as herself in several films: Risk/Reward, a documentary about the lives of women on Wall Street (2003); the 2009 remake of The Taking of Pelham 123, an action film about armed men who hijack a New York City subway train; the sequel drama film Wall Street: Money Never Sleeps (2010); the documentary Inside Job (2010); and the finance thriller, Arbitrage (2012).

Joey Ramone, of the punk rock pioneers The Ramones, developed a friendship with Bartiromo after the band broke up in the late 1990s. He subsequently wrote a song titled "Maria Bartiromo" that appeared on his solo album Don't Worry About Me, released posthumously in 2002.

== Filmography ==
- Buy Now! The Shopping Conspiracy (2024) - Self

== See also ==
- New Yorkers in journalism
