= Margot Gayle =

American historic preservationist

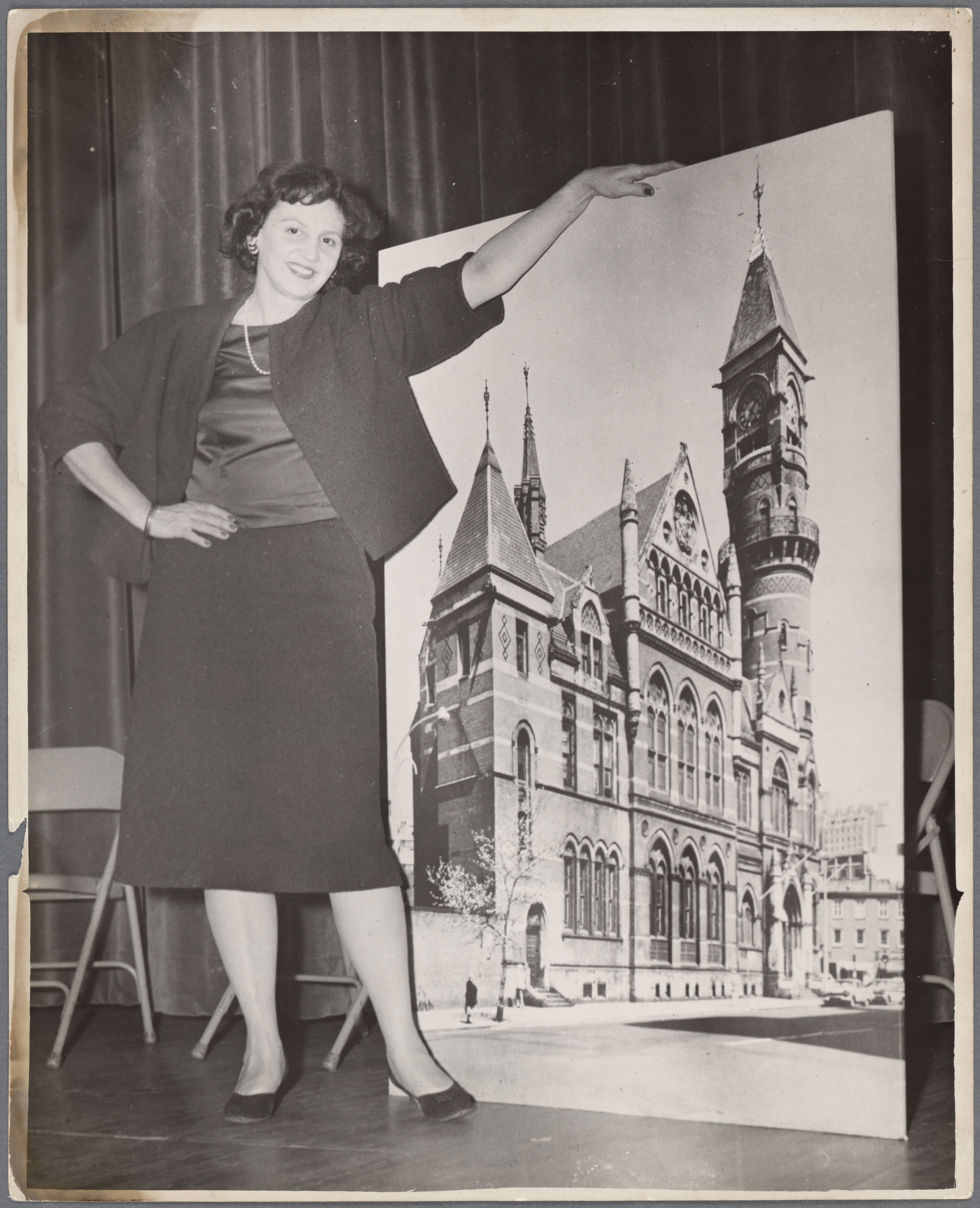
Margot Gayle with an enlarged photograph of the Jefferson Market Courthouse building.

Margot McCoy Gayle, born Sarah Margaret McCoy (/ˈmɑːrɡoʊ ˈɡeɪl/; May 14, 1908 – September 28, 2008), was an American historic preservationist, activist, and writer. She led efforts to preserve historic 19th century infrastructure across the United States, and to create the SoHo Cast Iron Historic District which preserved Victorian era cast-iron architecture in New York City.

== Early life and education ==
Margot McCoy was born in Kansas City, Missouri. She earned an undergraduate degree from University of Michigan and a master's degree in bacteriology from Emory University. Gayle married accountant William T. Gayle and the couple lived in Greenwich Village in New York City until their divorce in 1957. She had two daughters, Carol and Gretchen.

== Career and activism ==
Gayle was a lifelong Democratic Party activist and a member of the League of Women Voters. While studying in Atlanta, she lobbied for repeal of the Jim Crow-era poll taxes that were meant to suppress voter registration, and was so active on that issue that she earned the nickname "Poll Tax Margot".

In 1957, she made a New York City Council bid as a reform candidate running with the slogan "We need a woman in City Hall." She lost that election to Republican incumbent Stanley Isaacs.

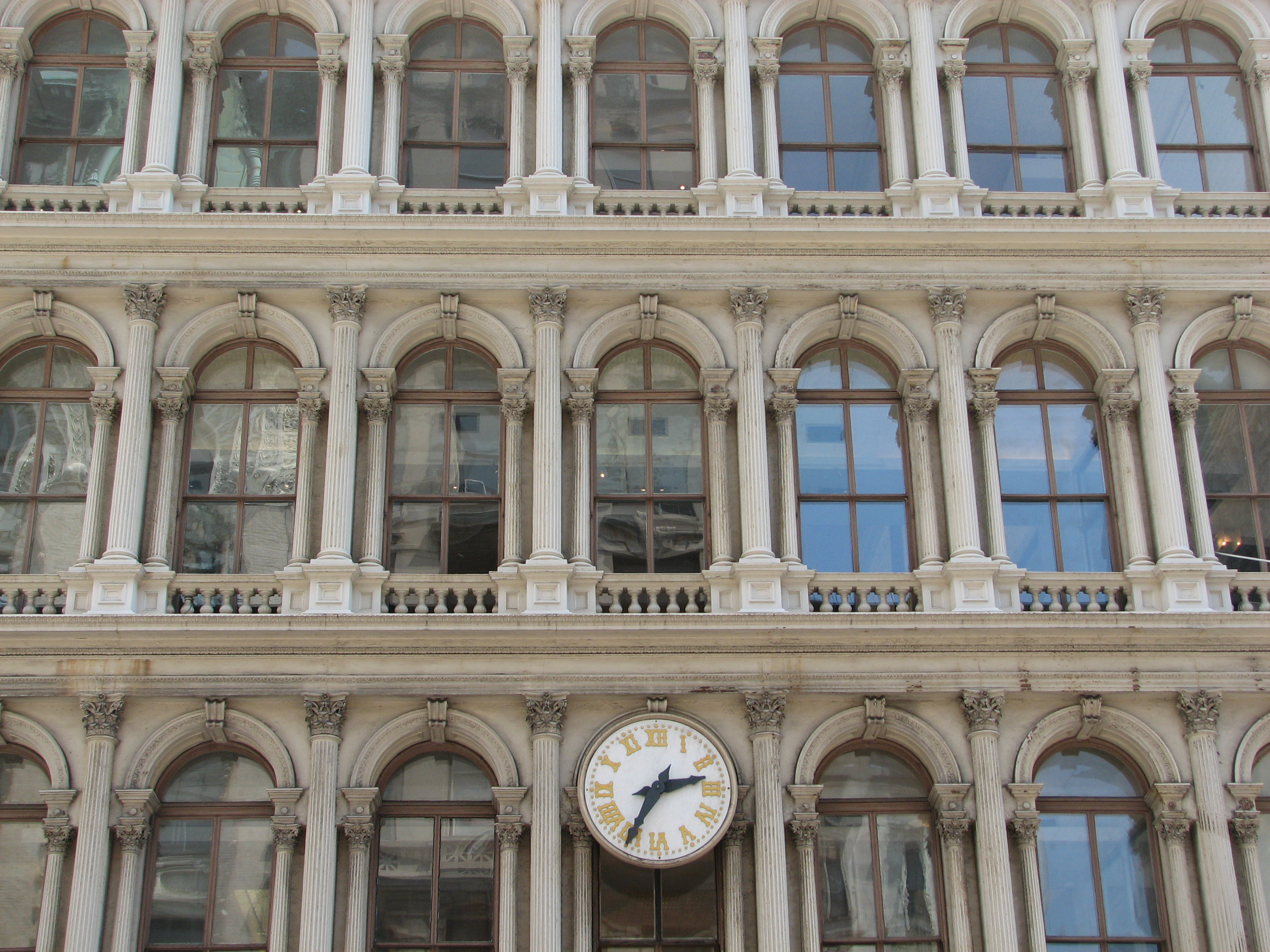
The E.V. Haughwout Building, which Gayle called "the finest of existing iron-front commercial buildings produced by the Architectural Iron Works (or any other foundry for that matter)."

=== Historical preservation ===
Gayle's involvement in city politics introduced her to the issue of historical preservation, which would become her life's work. In 1956 she became the only woman member on the historic buildings committee of the Municipal Art Society, under the leadership of Alan Burnham. The committee held meetings at the Century Club, where women were not permitted entry, so Margot had to keep up with committee activities by reading meeting minutes afterwards.

In the wake of the destruction of Pennsylvania Station, she helped lobby on behalf of the landmarks preservation law of 1965. Gayle was the founder of many advocacy and preservationist groups in the New York City area, including the Victorian Society in America, the Friends of Cast-Iron Architecture, and the Friends of the city's Historic Clocks. She was nicknamed the "Time Lady" and "Cast Iron Lady", and has described herself as a "professional clock agitator". Gayle was especially interested in public clocks, and successfully fought to get many of them protected, including the Yorkville Clock at 85th St and Third Avenue (landmarked in 1981) and the Sun Clock, near City Hall at Broadway and Chambers Street.

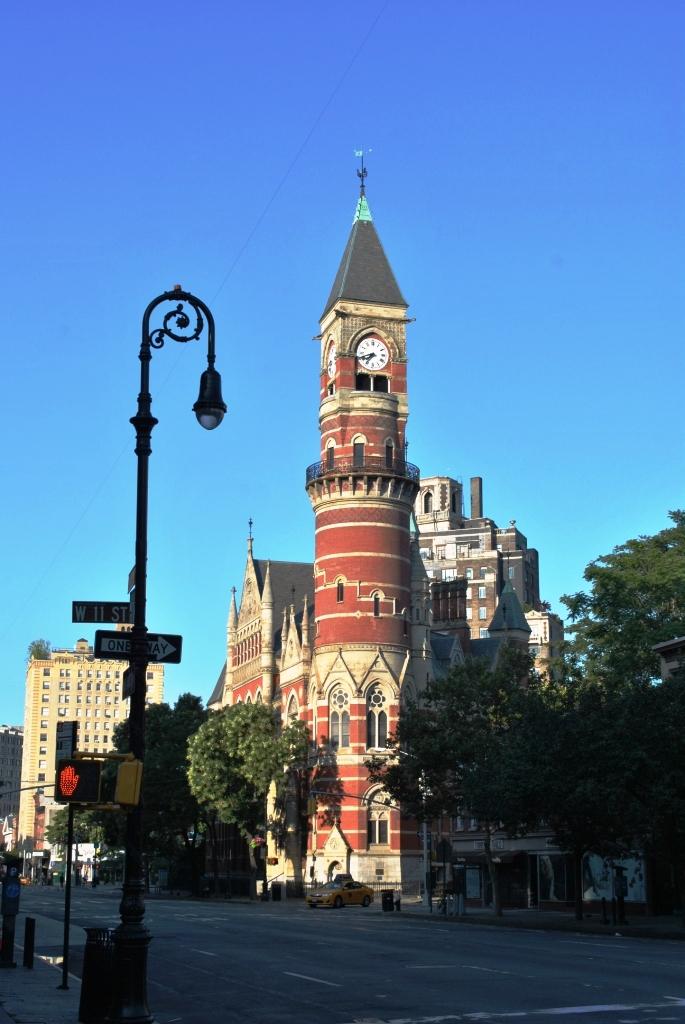
Jefferson Market Courthouse with "Bishop's Crook" lamp post at left

==== Jefferson Market Courthouse ====
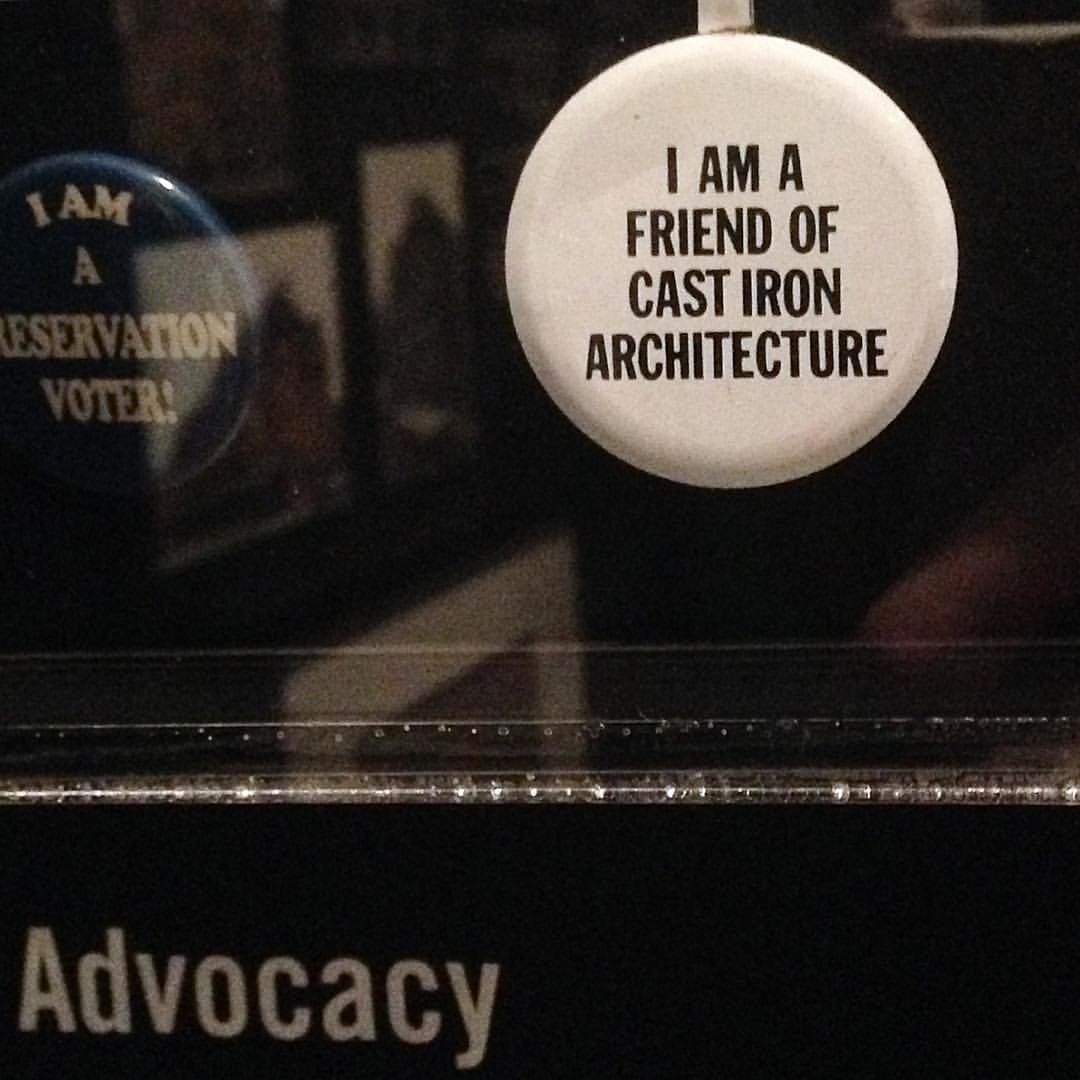
Button distributed by Gayle's "Friends of Cast Iron Architecture" organization

In 1958, after hearing that the Victorian-Gothic Jefferson Market Courthouse was being considered for sale by the city, Gayle began a community effort calling for the preservation of the building. The group included other local activists and luminaries like Ruth Wittenberg, Jane Jacobs, Lewis Mumford, Edward Hopper, Maurice Evans, and e.e. cummings. They first worked to get the stopped clocks on each side of the building back into working condition, holding meetings in Gayle's apartment at 44 West Ninth Street and called themselves the Committee of Neighbors To Get The Clock on the Jefferson Market Courthouse Started.

After the preservationist groups gained the support of Manhattan Borough President Edward Dudley and Mayor Robert Wagner, the clock was back in working order by 1961 and Gayle shifted her focus to preserving the building itself. The courthouse was renovated in 1967 under the oversight of architect Giorgio Cavaglieri and now houses a branch of the New York Public Library. This renovation was one of the first significant historical preservation projects in New York City, and set a precedent for a preservationist movement that would gain strength in the following decade.

==== Cast iron preservation ====
Margot Gayle described cast-iron architecture as her "all-consuming passion." In 1970 she founded the group the Friends of Cast Iron Architecture (FCIA) as part of the opposition to Robert Moses's plan to build an expressway through TriBeCa and SoHo. The expressway project was abandoned in 1971 and the 26-block SoHo Cast Iron Historic District was established in 1973. It preserved important buildings and protected the neighborhood from the rapid development that was occurring in neighboring areas of Manhattan. To increase public appreciation of cast-iron architecture, Gayle and other FCIA members led walking tours of architectural landmarks in SoHo, handing out magnets to demonstrate that the facades really were made of iron.

Gayle also worked to get landmark status for individual buildings including 287 Broadway, designed by John B. Snook; 319 Broadway, designed by David and John Jardine; and 90–94 Maiden Lane, the Roosevelt & Sons building. Gayle was also involved in the designation of the Bennett Building, New York City's largest cast-iron-fronted building.

==== Bishop's Crook Lamppost ====
In 1973 Gayle convinced the New York City Department of Water Supply, Gas, and Electricity to save 24 examples of the original 1896 "Bishop's crook" gas street lamp designed by Richard Rogers Bowker. They were later reproduced and became the standard street lamp model for historical projects in New York City.

== Writing ==
Gayle first moved to New York City as a script writer for CBS Radio. She wrote a talk show called The Margaret Allen Show, and sometimes included segments about architectural landmarks she was interested in preserving, like the St. Peter's Church clock in the Chelsea neighborhood of Manhattan.

She wrote an architecture column for The Daily News for 16 years.

=== Publications ===
- Cast Iron Architecture in New York: A Photographic Survey with Edmund V. Gillon (1974)
- Metals in America's Historic Buildings with John Waite and David Look (1980)
- Guide to Manhattan’s Outdoor Sculpture with Michele Cohen (1988)
- Cast Iron Architecture in America: The Significance of James Bogardus with Carol Gayle (1998)

== Honors and legacy ==
Margot Gayle received the first New York Landmarks Conservancy Lucy G. Moses Preservation Leadership Award (1993); the General Tools Award for Distinguished Service to Industrial Archaeology from the Society for Industrial Archeology (1997); the Jacqueline Kennedy Onassis Medal from the Municipal Arts Society (1997); and a Lifetime Achievement Award from the New York State Historic Preservation Office (2000). She also received the Historic Districts Council's Landmarks Lion award in 1993. A limited edition of a special beer was created and brewed in her honor In 2020 (and again in 2022). It was brewed by the Torch and Crown Brewing Company of SoHo New York and was named "Magnetic Energy." The name refers to the magnets she gave to participants on her tours of SoHo. The magnets were used to identify the cast iron components in each building's facade.

In 2022 a newly created public plaza in SoHo, Manhattan was named Rapkin-Gayle Plaza after Margot Gayle and urban planner Chester Rapkin.
