= S. Samuel DiFalco =

American judge (1906–1978)

S. Samuel DiFalco (July 26, 1906 – June 28, 1978) was a New York Supreme Court Justice and surrogate court judge.

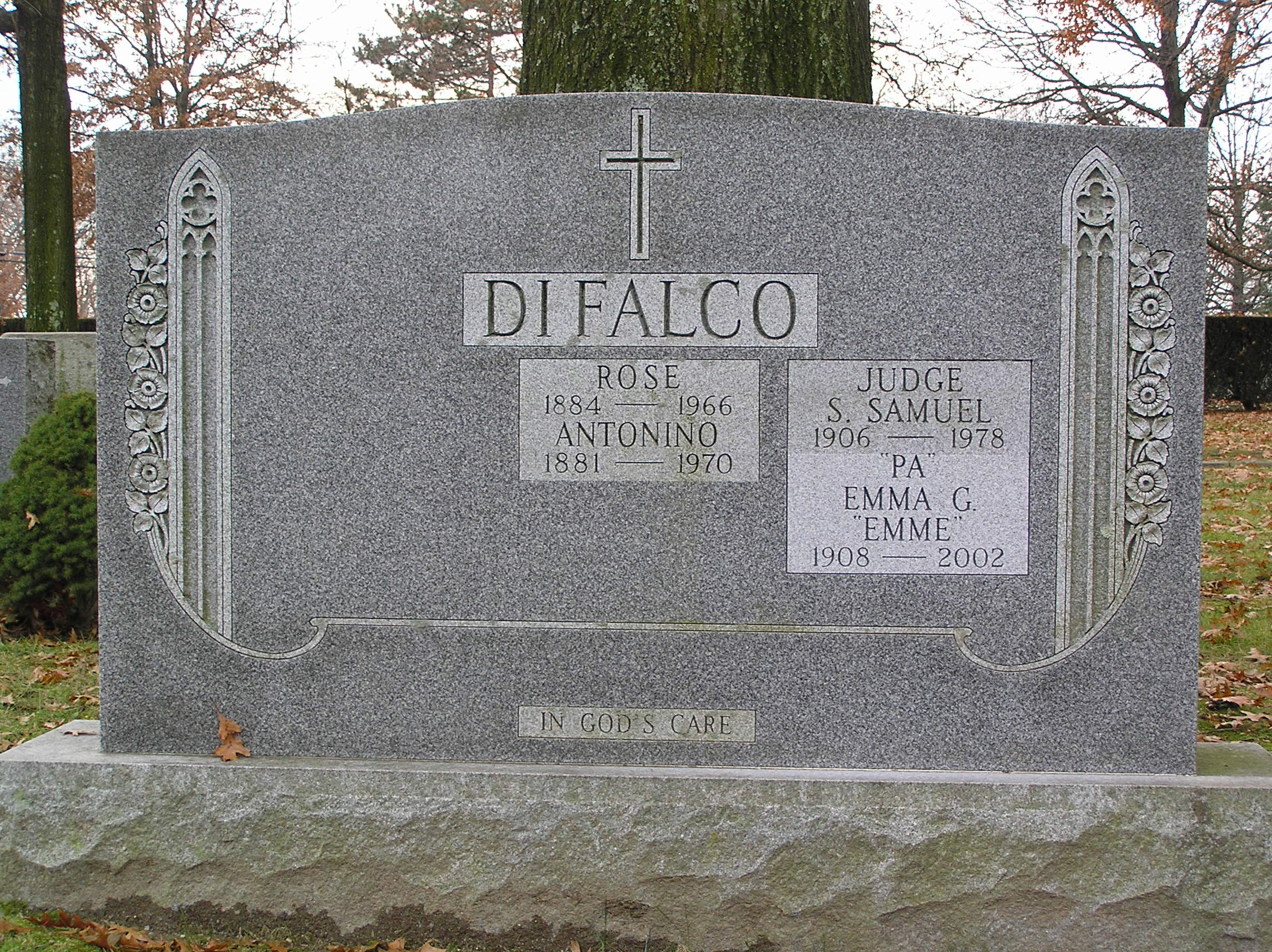
The gravesite of Judge DiFalco

Born in Italy, DiFalco was a Democrat who attempted a run for State Assembly in 1935. He became a justice of the New York Supreme Court in 1949, and was later elected to New York Surrogate Court. DiFalco was a member of Tammany Hall. In the 1967 constitutional convention, DiFalco successfully opposed an effort to abolish the surrogate court and merge its jurisdiction into the state supreme court. In May 1976, he was indicted along with Justice Irving H. Saypol on official misconduct charges in an alleged scheme to obtain appraisal and auction commission funds for Saypol's son; the charges were dismissed. In February 1978, DiFalco was again indicted, this time for criminal contempt in connection with stating to a grand jury that he could not remember having spoken to an assistant about arranging favorable rulings for his son's law firm. Before the case went to trial, DiFalco died of a heart attack at age 71 while dining with friends at the Columbus Club in Manhattan. He was survived by his wife Emma and his two children, Anthony and Elisa. DiFalco was interred at Gate of Heaven Cemetery, Hawthorne, N.Y.

== Sources ==
- The Political Graveyard: Politicians in Trouble or Disgrace: New York
- The New York Times, February 6, 1978.
