= Jefferson Market Library =

- Jefferson Market Library (Third Judicial District Courthouse)
- U.S. National Register of Historic Places
- U.S. National Historic Landmark
- U.S. Historic district – Contributing property
- New York State Register of Historic Places
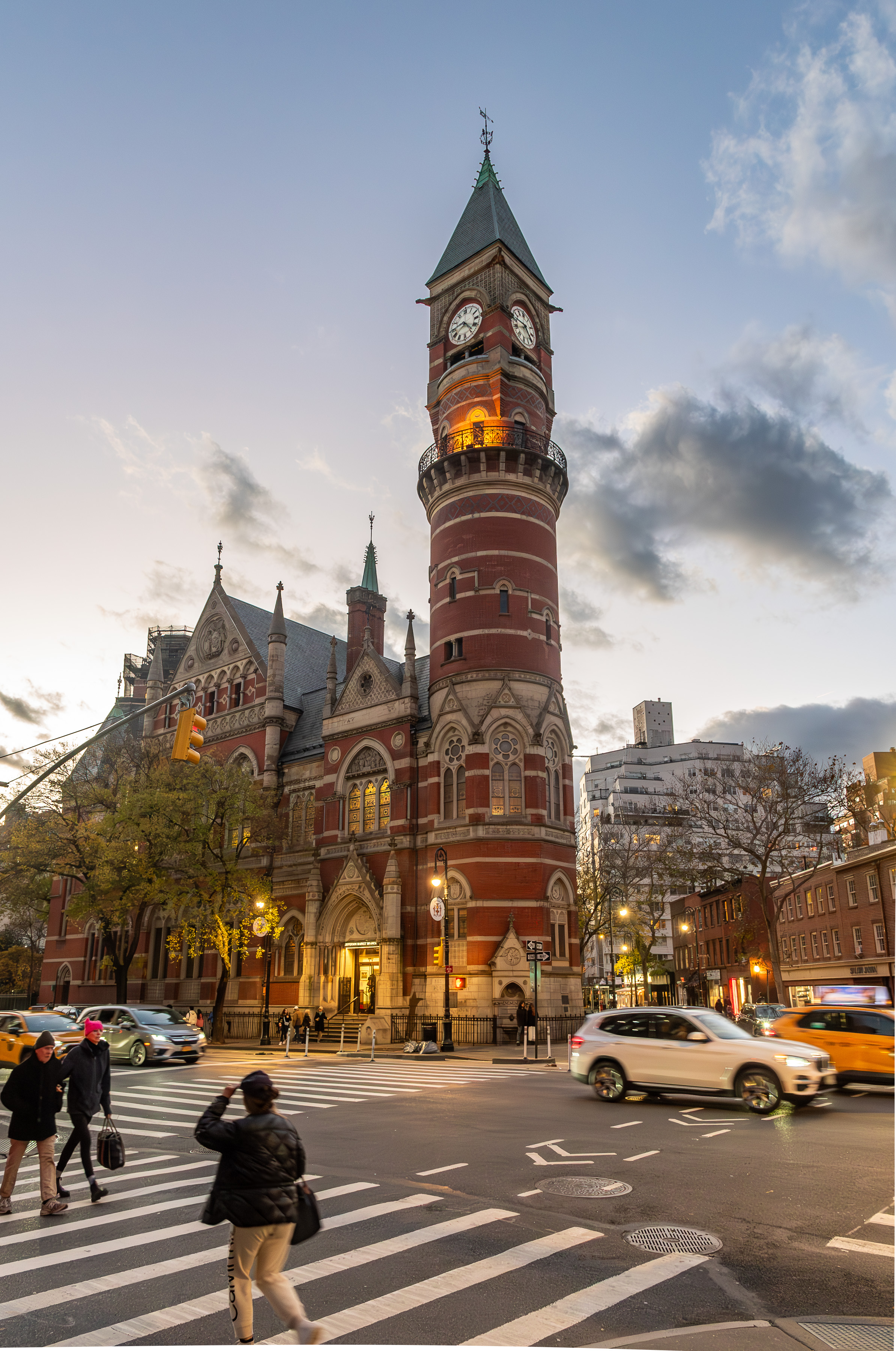
- At sunset in 2024
- Location: 425 Avenue of the Americas; Manhattan, New York City
- Coordinates: 40°44′5″N 73°59′57″W
- Built: 1874–1877
- Architect: Frederick Clarke Withers
- Architectural style: High Victorian Gothic
- Part of: Greenwich Village Historic District (ID79001604)
- NRHP reference No.: 72000875
- NYSRHP No.: 06101.000423

Significant dates
- Added to NRHP: November 9, 1972
- Designated NHL: December 22, 1977
- Designated NYSRHP: June 23, 1980

The Jefferson Market Branch of the New York Public Library, once known as the Jefferson Market Courthouse, is a National Historic Landmark located at 425 Avenue of the Americas (Sixth Avenue), on the southwest corner of West 10th Street, in Greenwich Village, Manhattan, New York City, on a triangular plot formed by Greenwich Avenue and West 10th Street. It was originally built as the Third Judicial District Courthouse from 1874 to 1877, and was designed by architect Frederick Clarke Withers of the firm of Vaux and Withers.

Though faced with demolition in 1958, public outcry led to its reuse as a branch of the New York Public Library. The building is now part of the New York City Landmark Preservation Commission's Greenwich Village Historic District, created in 1969. In addition, the building was placed on the National Register of Historic Places in 1972 and made a National Historic Landmark in 1977. The AIA Guide to New York City calls the building "A mock Neuschwansteinian assemblage ... of leaded glass, steeply sloping roofs, gables, pinnacles, Venetian Gothic embellishments, and an intricate tower and clock; one of the City's most remarkable buildings."

== Early history and architecture ==
A tall octagonal wooden fire lookout tower was the first building on the site, built circa 1833, located in the center of the merchants' sheds at the Jefferson Market that had been established at this site in 1832 and named for the late President. Court sessions were held in the Jefferson Assembly Rooms that rose above the market sheds. The wood tower and the market structures were torn down by the city to build a new courthouse, the adjacent Jefferson Market Prison building that stood on the corner of West 10th Street and Greenwich Avenue and new coordinated market housing (built in 1883). Of the carefully massed eclectic and picturesque group, only the former Courthouse now remains.

The commission for the new courthouse went to the firm of Vaux and Withers, but as Calvert Vaux was busy with the American Museum of Natural History and the Metropolitan Museum of Art, the design fell to his partner, the English-born Frederick Clarke Withers. Withers came from the same background as Vaux, so it is not unusual that his High Victorian Gothic design was similar in some respects to the "Ruskinian Gothic" aesthetic of Vaux's early buildings, such as in its polychrome materials – red brick, black stone, white granite, yellow sandstone trim and variegated roof slates. Reasoning that a building with a clock tower was going to look like a church no matter what he did, Withers decided to add church-like touches with non-religious content, such as the tympanum which shows a scene from The Merchant of Venice instead of the usual scene of Christ sitting in judgment or other ecclesiastical subject matter. The building also features stained glass windows and a fountain decorated with birds and animals.

The courthouse was completed in 1877, and in 1885 a panel of American architects sponsored by American Architect and Building News voted it the fifth most beautiful building in America.

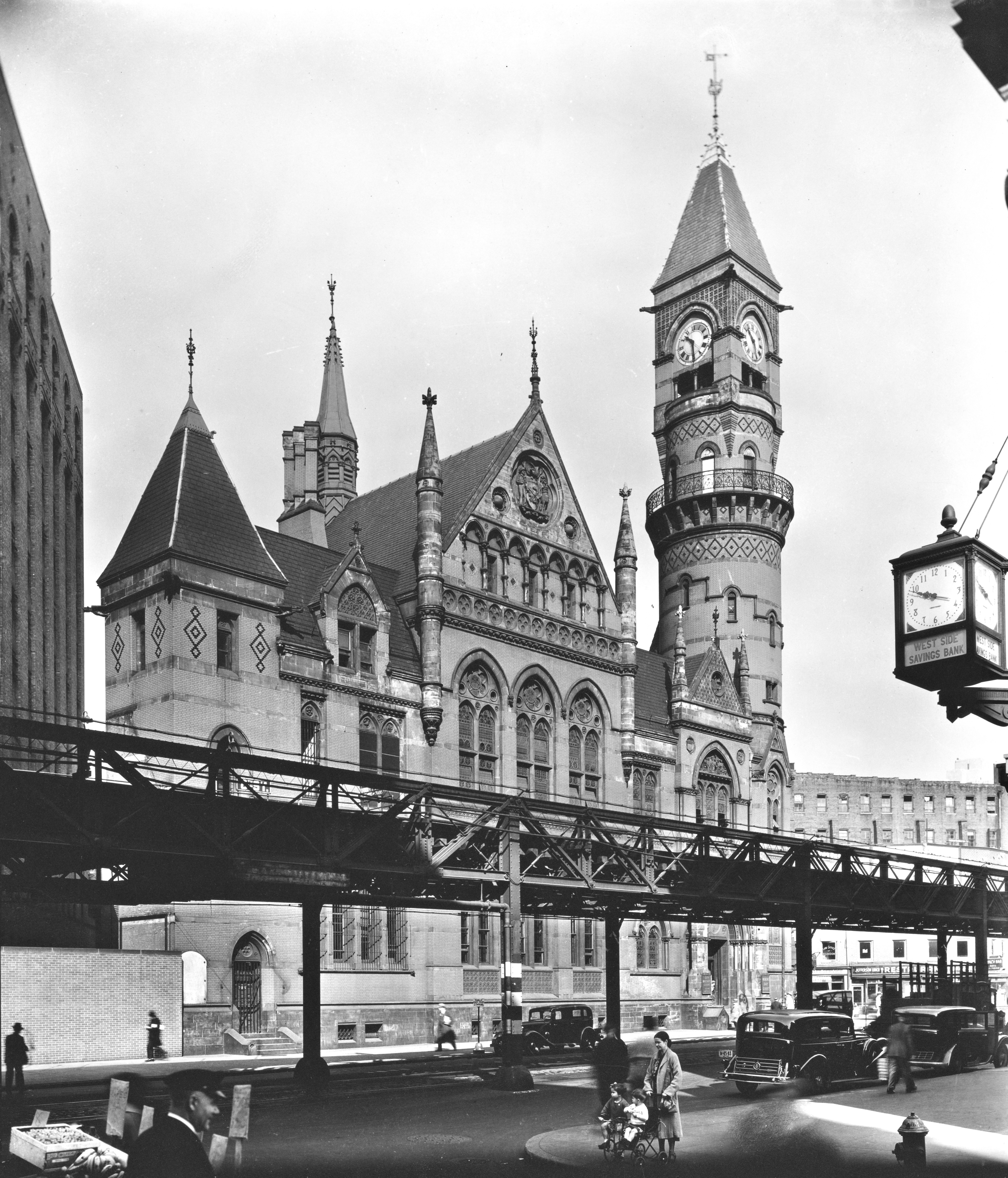
Jefferson Market Court in 1935, with the IRT Sixth Avenue Line in front of it. Photograph by Berenice Abbott (1935)

== Use and reuse ==
The building got substantial use as a courthouse, as the Third Judicial District covered the Madison Square area, where the city's entertainment district – The Tenderloin – was located. So heavy was the traffic, that the country's first night court began there. Among the more noted people arraigned in the courthouse was Harry K. Thaw, the murderer of celebrity architect Stanford White.

The building ceased to be used as a courthouse in 1945; its future was uncertain, and it was in danger of being torn down. A group of community preservationists led by Margot Gayle and Ruth Wittenberg formed the Committee of Neighbors to Get the Clock on Jefferson Market Courthouse Started and campaigned to have the building converted into a library. In 1961, the New York Public Library agreed to the plan and architect Giorgio Cavaglieri was brought in to restore the exterior and redesign the building's interior for its new use – one of the first adaptive reuse projects in the United States, and a signal event in the historic preservation movement. The restoration is estimated to have cost $1.4 million. The library opened in 1967, with the police court becoming the Children's Reading Room, the Civil Court the Adult Reading Room. Budget cutbacks in 1974 caused the Board of Trustees of the New York Public Library to vote to close the branch, as well as two others. After an outcry from residents, the decision was rescinded one month later.

The building was listed on the National Register of Historic Places in 1972 and was declared a National Historic Landmark in 1977, both under the name "Third Judicial District Courthouse".

The building received further restoration in 1994 by preservationist architect Joseph Pell Lombardi.

== Recent history ==
Video architectural tour of the Jefferson Market Library

In 1996 "Ol' Jeff", the fire bell, silent in the Tower for 135 years, regained its voice with Margot Gayle's help, thanks to Cynthia Crane and Marilyn Dorato. It strikes the hours from 9am to 10pm. On April 13, 1997, The New York Times wrote: "The bell has newly and unexpectedly connected the community surrounding the building on Avenue of the Americas at 10th Street, helping to put the concept of village back in Greenwich Village; it serves as a powerful, an hourly, reminder of the values of architectural preservation."

There are annual tours of the tower, typically during Open House New York weekend in October.

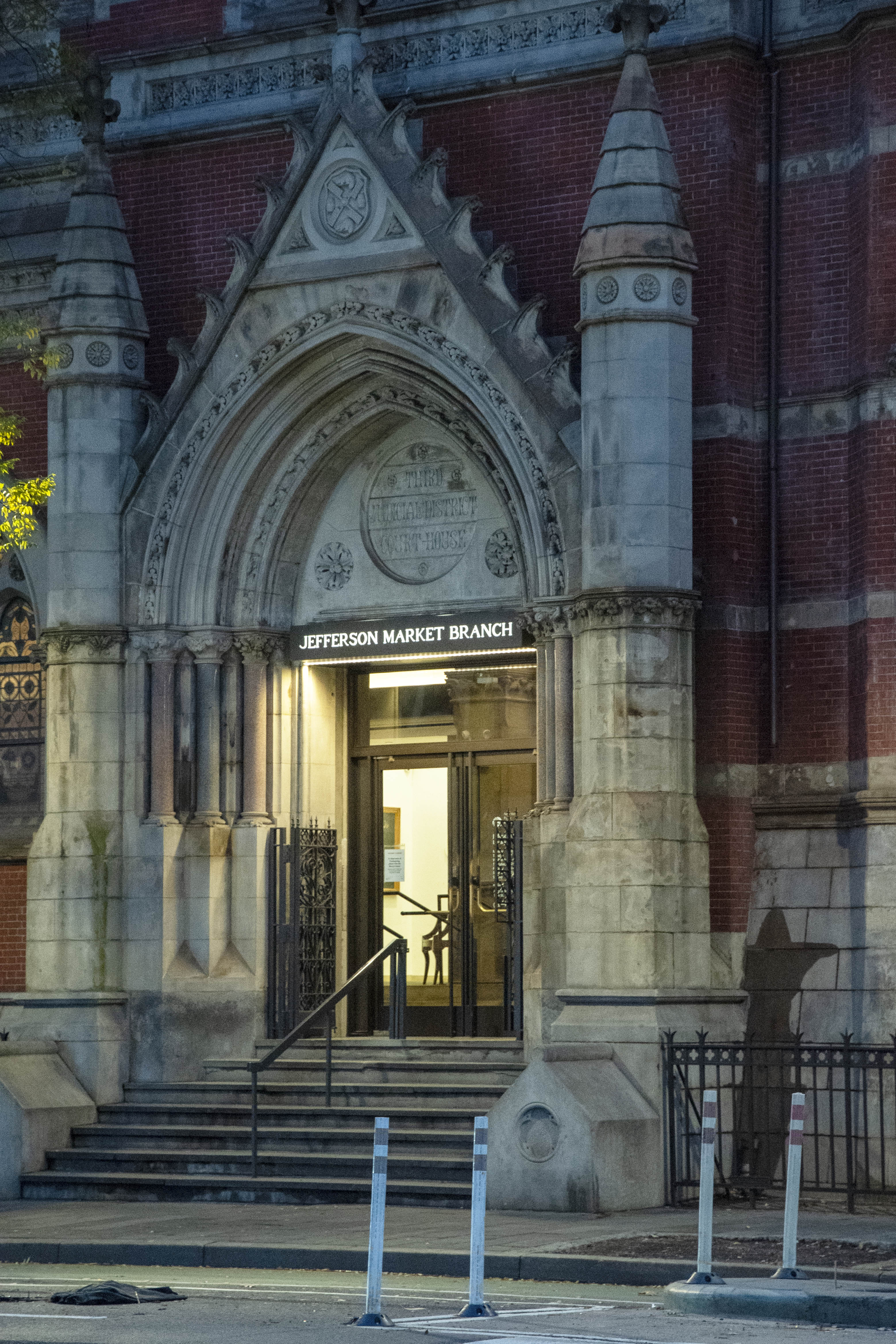
The main entrance to the Jefferson Market Library

By 2012 the building's exterior was once again in need of restoration, deteriorated ornaments were re-sculpted from the original Ohio sandstone. The tower's railings and finial were repaired and resecured. Missing and broken slates were replaced on the slate roof and a new copper drainage system installed. Brick and stone were re-pointed and cleaned. SUPERSTRUCTURES Engineers + Architects led the restoration. The owners and project team were honored by the New York Landmarks Conservancy with its Lucy G. Moses Preservation Award in 2014.

The building had further improvements in 2019 to bring it in compliance with the Americans with Disabilities Act of 1990. It reopened in July 2022.

The library manager is Frank Collerius who also presents the New York Public Library's podcast The Librarian Is In.

== See also ==
- List of National Historic Landmarks in New York City
- National Register of Historic Places listings in Manhattan below 14th Street
