= Irving H. Saypol =

American lawyer

Irving Howard Saypol
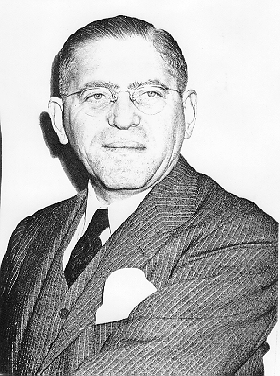

New York Supreme Court Justice
- In office 1952–1968

United States Attorney for the Southern District of New York
- In office 1949–1951
- Preceded by: John F. X. McGohey
- Succeeded by: Myles J. Lane

Personal details
- Born: September 3, 1905 Lower East Side; Manhattan, New York City
- Died: June 30, 1977 (aged 71) Manhattan, New York City
- Spouse: Adele D. Kaplan
- Education: St. Lawrence University; Brooklyn Law School

Irving Howard Saypol (September 3, 1905 – June 30, 1977) was a United States attorney for the Southern District of New York and a New York Supreme Court Justice. He directed several high-profile prosecutions of Communists, including the cases of Alger Hiss, William Remington, Abraham Brothman, and Julius and Ethel Rosenberg.

== Early life and education ==
He was born on September 3, 1905, one of four sons of Louis and Michakin Saypol, an American Jewish family, on the Lower East Side of Manhattan.

He attended night classes at Brooklyn Law School, where he met fellow student Adele B. Kaplan; they married in September 1925. She was a year ahead of him, and he graduated in 1927. They both became attorneys; he was admitted to the bar in 1928. They had three children together, a daughter and twin sons.

== Career ==
After working for a period for the City Corporation Counsel after law school, Irving Saypol established his own practice. In 1945 he was appointed as Chief Assistant United States Attorney, and four years later to the top position in the region as the United States Attorney for the Southern District of New York. Irving Saypol led the prosecution of several members of the Communist Party of the United States (CPUSA), including Eugene Dennis, William Z. Foster, John Gates, Robert G. Thompson, Gus Hall, William Remington, Abraham Brothman, and Miriam Moskowitz. As a result of these prosecutions, Time described Saypol as "the nation's number one legal hunter of top communists."

From 1950 to 1951 Saypol served as Chief Prosecutor for the federal government in the espionage case against Julius and Ethel Rosenberg and Morton Sobell.

Saypol was elected in 1951 to a 14-year term on the New York Supreme Court, serving from 1952 until 1968. Saypol was one of 14 judges indicted by a special prosecutor. Appointed to investigate police corruption, this prosecutor pursued the judiciary as well. None of the prosecutions were successful; in Saypol's case the court found that the allegation of $125 bribery, as stated in the indictment, was unsubstantiated. The opinion states: "Taken as a whole, the evidence not only does not establish a legal basis for a charge of bribery, but clearly confirms that there was no bribe."

In 1975 Saypol ruled against the landmark designation for Grand Central Terminal in New York City. This would have removed legal barriers to the construction of a 59-story office tower on top of the terminal. Following the demolition of historic Penn Station, this project helped catalyze the historic preservation movement in New York, and more historic buildings were protected from such intrusions. Saypol's decision was roundly and widely criticized by the legal community, and was overturned by three higher courts, including the Supreme Court of the United States in Penn Central Transportation Co. v. New York City.

== Death ==
Saypol died from cancer on June 30, 1977, at his home at 152 East 94th Street in Manhattan. At his funeral Judge Charles D. Breitel said, "He had an outstanding career and was happily married for 52 years. What more could a person ask for?"

== Legacy ==
One of his sons, Ronald Dietz Saypol, became an attorney and businessman. He married Cynthia Otis, a granddaughter of Joshua Lionel Cowen, co-founder of Lionel Corporation.

Grand Central Terminal has been renovated and expanded several times.

== Sources ==
- The Political Graveyard: Index to Politicians: Sawyers to Saywell
- Biographies of Participants in the Rosenbergs Trial
