= Ruth Wittenberg =

American activist and historic preservationist

Ruth Wittenberg (née Budinoff) (1899–1990) was an American activist and historic preservationist who advocated for the preservation of historic buildings in New York City's Greenwich Village. She was a leading figure in the successful movement to designate Greenwich Village a historic district.

== Early life and education ==
Ruth Budinoff was born in Brooklyn, New York. She attended Hunter College and Barnard College and worked as a demographer for the Bell Telephone Company. Wittenberg developed a strong connection to the Greenwich Village neighborhood as a college student who idolized Village literary and intellectual figures like Crystal Eastman, Edna St. Vincent Millay, Floyd Dell, and Mabel Dodge.

== Activism ==
Wittenberg began a lifelong commitment to activism when she became involved in suffragist and women's rights movements in the early 20th century. After moving to Greenwich Village, she became concerned about the rapid pace of change in the neighborhood, and joined community efforts to advocate for preservation of buildings and against what she saw as destructive real estate projects. She served as co-chairman of the Save our Square Committee, a coalition of 22 community organizations, which took on powerful real estate developers and institutions like St Vincent's Hospital and the New School in its efforts to preserve and rehabilitate the Washington Square Park area.

In the late 1960s, Wittenberg was involved in an unsuccessful protest against the construction of the Elmer Holmes Bobst Library at New York University, which she and other local residents considered too large for its site at Washington Square Park. The group of neighborhood activists, including Jane Jacobs and Verna Small, believed that the tall building would cast a large shadow across the park, obstructing sunlight from large portions of public space.

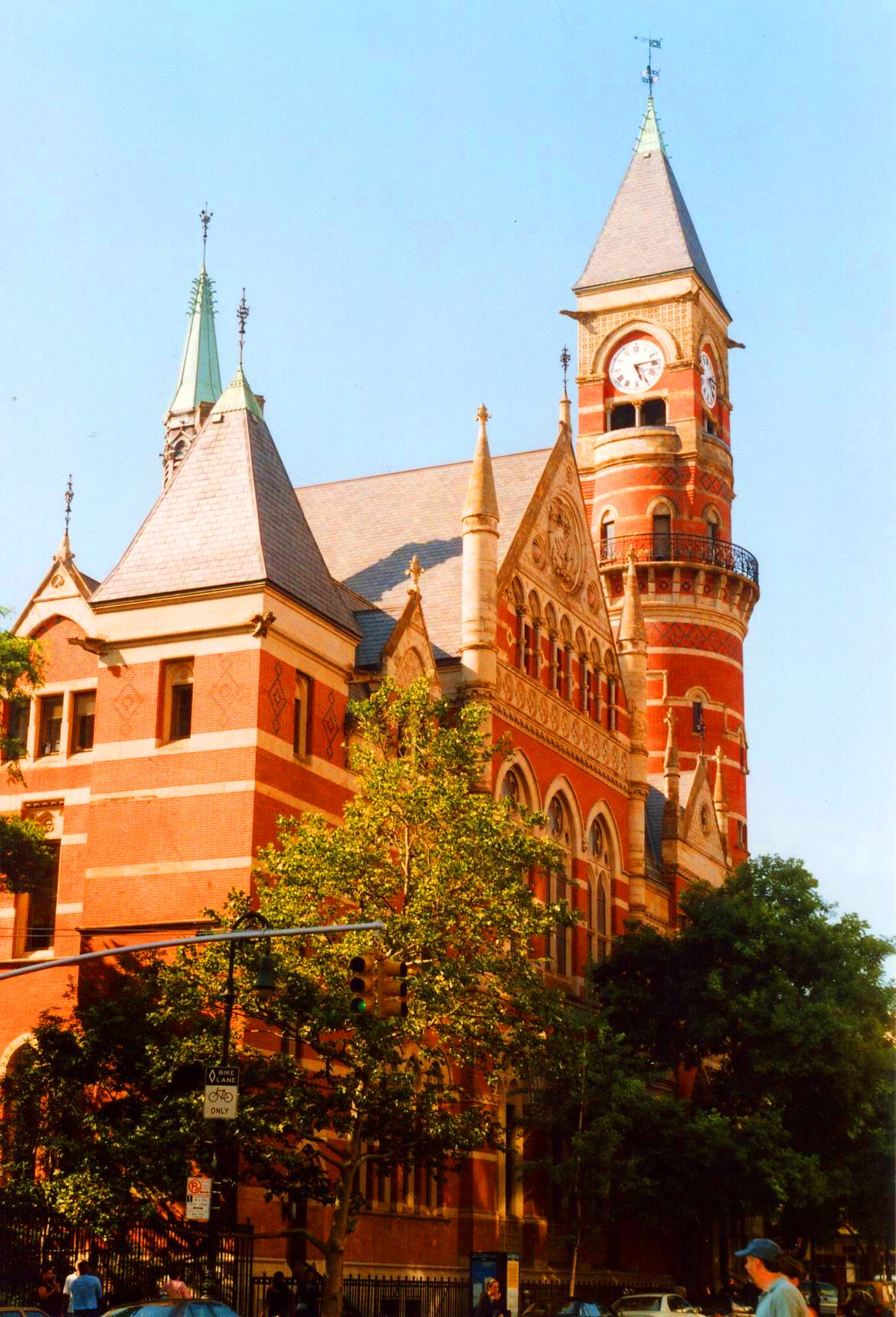
Jefferson Market Courthouse

She was part of an effort, led by Margot Gayle, to preserve the Jefferson Market Courthouse building on 10th Street, which now houses a branch of the New York Public Library. Wittenberg was the leader of an affiliated movement to have the adjacent Women's House of Detention demolished and converted into a community garden. The then-empty jail building, which Wittenberg described as "aesthetically grim", was torn down in 1971. She led a community effort against plans to build apartments or a community center in its place, advocating instead for the preservation of open space. Wittenberg was responsible for bringing many well-known Greenwich Village artists and residents on board with the effort, among them e.e. cummings, Morris Ernst, Maurice Evans, and Edward Hopper.

Wittenberg served on Community Board 2, representing Washington Square Park and Greenwich Village, from 1951 until her death in 1990. She served as chairwoman of its Landmarks Committee and played a major role in the successful movement to acquire a Landmark Historical District designation for much of Greenwich Village. When Wittenberg broke her hip in 1975 and again 1976, Community Board 2 held meetings in her hospital room until she recovered enough to attend board meetings on crutches or in her wheelchair.

During her tenure on Community Board 2, Wittenberg was vocal in challenging development plans that she thought would adversely affect the historic neighborhood. In the late 1970s, she protested architect Hugh Hardy's proposed replacement design for 18 West 11th Street, the town house destroyed in an accidental explosion caused the detonation of a bomb built by members of the Weather Underground. During the 1980s, Wittenberg opposed architect James Polshek's design for a residential building on Avenue of the Americas between Waverly and Washington Place, citing its lack of a cornice and projecting lintels and window sills. She also campaigned for tasteful street signage, working to reduce advertising with "flashing lights, open store fronts, shiny plastic materials and logos."

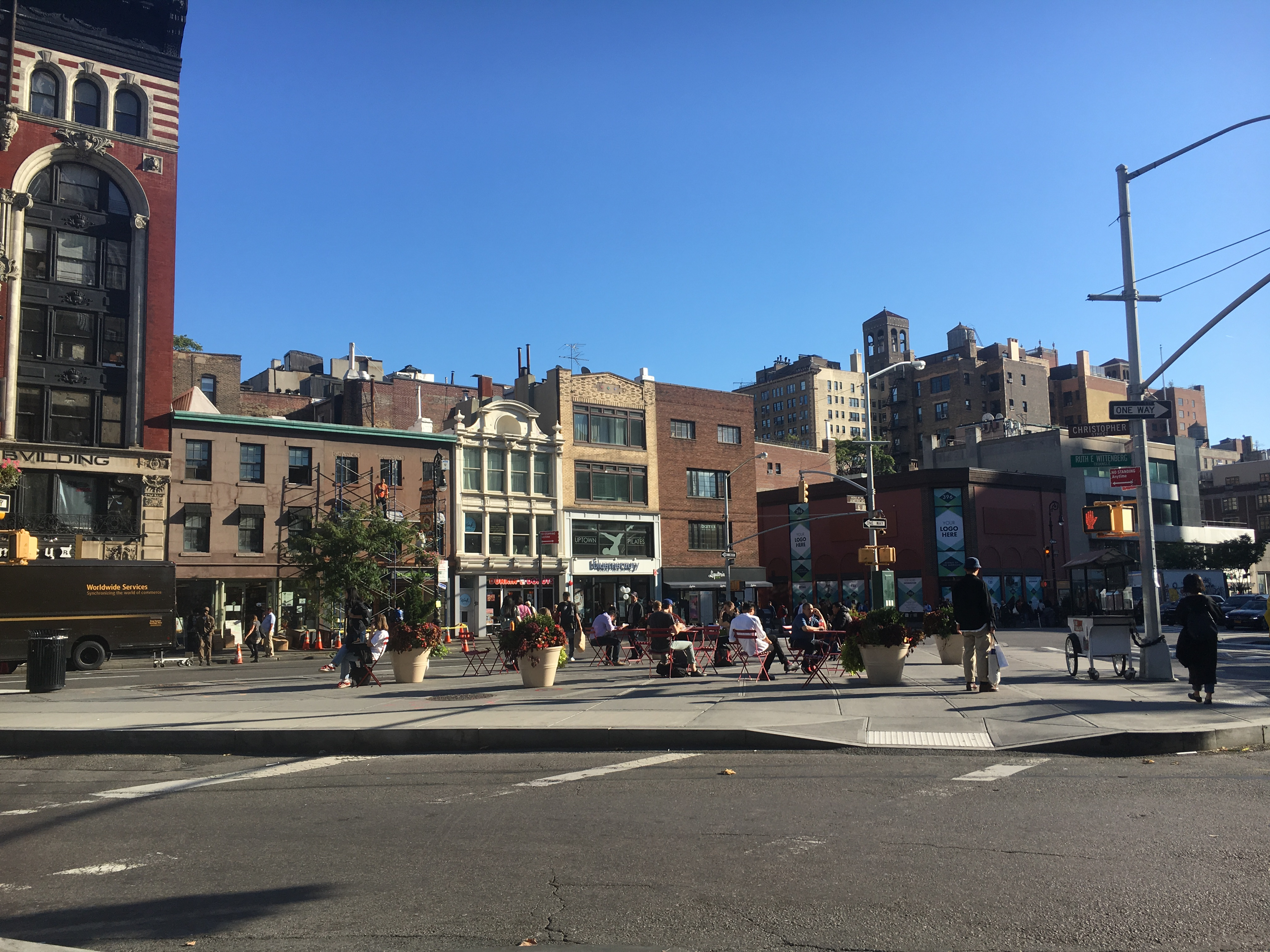
Ruth Wittenberg Triangle in Greenwich Village

== Personal life ==
Ruth married Philip Wittenberg, a copyright lawyer and civil liberties attorney, in 1919. In the 1920s, the couple bought a three-story brick house at 35 West 10th Street in Greenwich Village, where they raised two children, Jonathan and Susanna. Ruth lived there for 65 years before dying of natural causes at the age of 91.

== Honors and legacy ==
Ruth Wittenberg Triangle, named in 1990 in her honor, is located in Manhattan at the intersection of Greenwich Avenue, Avenue of the Americas, and Christopher Street, just south of the Jefferson Market Courthouse building that she fought to preserve. It is often the site of temporary public art installations.
