= St. Luke's Episcopal Church (Beacon, New York) =

Historic church in New York, United States

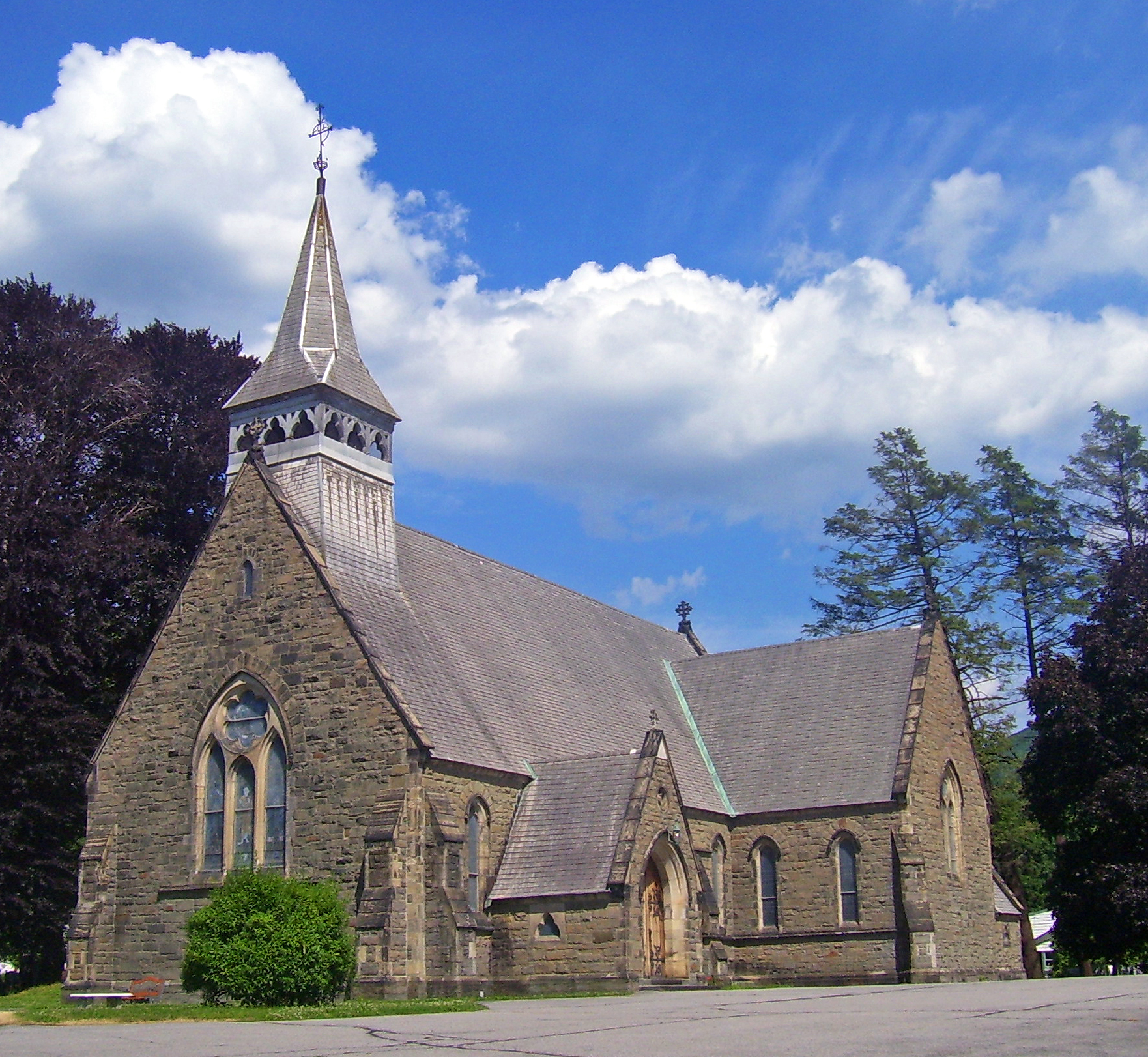
- West elevation and south profile of St. Luke's, 2008

Religion
- Affiliation: Episcopal Church in the United States of America
- Leadership: The Rev. Dr. Edwin H. Cromey (vicar)
- Year consecrated: 1879

Location
- Location: Beacon, NY, United States
- Interactive map of St. Luke's Episcopal Church
- Coordinates: 41°29′50″N 73°57′48″W

Architecture
- Architect: Frederick Clarke Withers
- Type: church
- Style: Gothic Revival
- General contractor: William Harloe
- Groundbreaking: 1868
- Completed: 1870
- Construction cost: $60,000

Specifications
- Direction of façade: west
- Width (nave): 29.5 feet (9.0 m)
- Materials: Bluestone, sandstone

U.S. National Register of Historic Places
- Added to NRHP: May 30, 2008
- NRHP Reference no.: 08000517

Website
- St. Luke's Episcopal Church - Beacon, NY

St. Luke's Episcopal Church is located in Beacon, New York, United States. The church complex of four buildings and a cemetery takes up a 12-acre (4.9 ha) parcel between Wolcott (NY 9D), Rector, Phillips and Union Streets. It was founded in 1832 as a religious school that soon became St. Anna's Church of Fishkill Landing.

The church and rectory were built from 1868 to 1870 from a design by Frederick Clarke Withers, who later on considered the former one of his best buildings. The Gothic Revival-styled building strongly reflects contemporary Ecclesiological theories of appropriate church architecture. Despite some modifications and restoration, the buildings and grounds have remained largely as they were when first built. The church was listed on the National Register of Historic Places in 2008 as "St. Luke's Episcopal Church Complex".

== Church complex ==
Withers' original design included the church and its rectory, on the corner of Wolcott and Rector. A Parish House was added near the end of the 19th century. It was added to, and a garage built, in the mid-20th. The church buildings and cemetery were laid out by Henry Winthrop Sargent.

=== Church ===
St. Luke's is a one-and-half-story asymmetrical cruciform building faced in Schenectady bluestone in an ashlar pattern with Ohio sandstone trim. It is over a hundred feet (30 m) in length and 60 feet (20 m) wide. Two porches extend from the south profile, a main entrance in the middle of the nave and a secondary one in the transept. There is another porch, pent-roofed, on the north transept. An organ and robing room is attached to the north side of the chancel.

The gabled roof is covered in a variety of materials, mostly cement-asbestos shingles, with some areas of slate and metal. A frame bell cote topped with cast iron cross rises from the west end. The roofline is further pierced by a stone chimney on the north transept and several English Decorated Gothic stone crosses at junctions on the east end. All windows are either lancet or round-arched, with some having additional trefoils. The stained glass was done by Louis Comfort Tiffany's firm and the British glaziers Bell & Almond. Above the main entrance is a bronze lamp with a stone medallion of a bull, the symbol of St. Luke.

The interior walls are plaster applied over an interior brick face, with vertical beadboard and molded chair rail complemented by a similar cornice at the joint between the walls and ceiling. The slip pews are made of oak with tre- and quatrefoil carvings at the ends. The floors in the center and side aisles are laid in a polychrome glass pattern, with carpet covering the area under the pews. There is a brass dedication plaque on the west wall.

Open stained pine trusses spring from corbels along the walls frame the ceiling. They are complemented by sandstone at the arches between the building sections and surrounding the windows and doors. The nave is lit by hanging lamps. In the chancel the bishop's throne, sedilia, prayer desk and stalls are all oak like the pews. The font is of Aubigny stone on a sandstone shaft.

Below the church is its basement. It remains largely unfinished, as it was when the church was built, and unused.

=== Rectory ===
The rectory was part of Withers' original design, and built along with the church. It is a likewise asymmetrical two-and-a-half-story structure of bluestone walls with brick trim, rebuilt to its original plan after a fire. The south-facing front features a gable and tower; the east elevation has a double gable. The west elevation has a single gabled dormer window with half-timbering. The roof is shingled in asphalt.

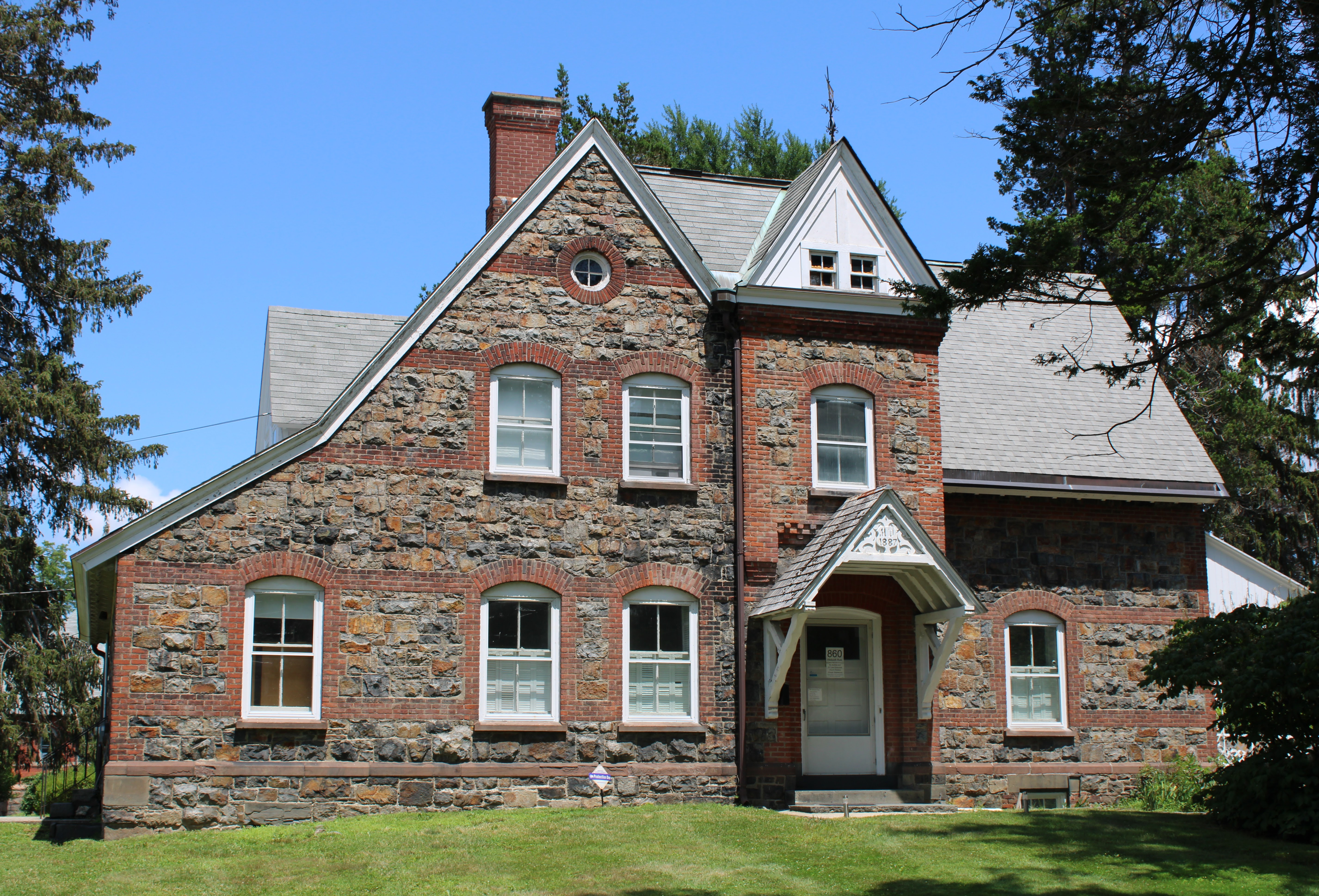
Front elevation, rectory

Inside, the house's decor reflects later Victorian stylings, due to the era in which it was rebuilt. The walls are plaster on lath; the floorboards are thin oak. The woodwork, particularly the mantels, use Eastlake decorative motifs. In the hallway next to the main staircase is the church's safe. The basement is, like the church's, unfinished.

=== Other outbuildings ===
The Parish House on Rector Street is a Romanesque Revival building with a large modern frame addition. A fireplace within it retains a cast-iron decorative plate from the rectory at the church's earlier location in downtown Beacon. Due to the additions, it is not considered a contributing property to the church's overall historic character.

The only other building on the property is the garage. It is a modern structure made of concrete blocks, and is also a non-contributing resource.

=== Cemetery and landscaping ===
While it is level at the southeast corner where the church buildings are, the grounds become gently undulating to the north. Sargent planted specimen trees along the edges, many of which survive. They mostly follow an irregular pattern, except for those that border a path to the church's north porch. The gravestones date from the mid-19th century to the present and include a variety of styles of funerary art. Two notable examples are a brownstone marker with a crocketed pinnacle whose date and decedent cannot be determined, and the Neoclassical monument of Isaac Van Nostrand, with a base, plinth and fluted Roman Doric column.

=== Aesthetics ===
Sargent and Withers were both devout Episcopalians, and followers of the contemporary Ecclesiological movement in church design that advocated the Gothic Revival style of rural English parish churches, similar to the work of A.W. Pugin, as the best form for an Anglican or Episcopal church. Withers, already having been exposed to this in his native England, had professed his allegiance to Ecclesiological principles in an 1858 essay, "A Few Hints on Church Building". His brief work with Andrew Jackson Downing and fellow English immigrant Calvert Vaux prior to the former's death had further strengthened his appreciation for the Picturesque mode of the Gothic Revival

Withers' design strongly reflects Downing's ideals of church design, of a building that harmonizes with the surrounding natural landscape. Several features, such as the broad nave, full transept, deep chancel, large south porch and frame bell cote, are exactly as prescribed by Ecclesiological writers. He involved himself in many of the church's minor details, even designing the altar cloth himself. In his 1873 book Church Architecture, he devoted a great deal of text and an illustration to St. Luke's, suggesting he was very proud of how it turned out.

The Rectory likewise reflects Withers' less conservative visions of domestic architecture on a smaller scale than his usual work, with its irregular and asymmetrical roofline and alternation of brick and stone. Its original tower, destroyed and not rebuilt after a later fire, enhanced its Gothic qualities with a steeply pitched roof.

Sargent's landscape was one of the rare times he and Withers worked together on a property. Its most notable Picturesque feature is the irregular placement of its trees apart from those that border the path from the church and the streets surrounding the plot.

== History ==
Since before the Revolution Fishkill's Trinity Church had been the only Episcopal house of worship in southeastern Dutchess County. It was not easily accessible to residents of the hamlets of Matteawan and Fishkill Landing, today's Beacon. So, in 1832, three local sisters began offering religious instruction to children at their house, today's Madam Brett Homestead. Their parents and other adults met in a dry goods store, and by the end of the year the group had reached the size where it could form a parish of its own. In 1833 it formally incorporated as St. Anna's, and the next year built a small brick church with columned portico at what is now the intersection of Main Street and Tioronda Avenue on donated land.

In the following decades, Tioronda became the railroad's right-of-way, making it a less desirable location. The church became neglected in turn. So the congregation decided in 1863 to build a new church elsewhere. One congregant, Charles Wolcott, gave six acres next to the church's then-cemetery. In 1866 he added the adjacent land of equal size then used as a cemetery by a local Presbyterian church.

The deed stipulated that a religious edifice of at least $20,000 in value ($439,773 inflation adjusted 1866 value) had to be built on the property within three years of its conveyance to the church. To raise the money, the church sold both its old church and rectory.

Withers, who had already built the Reformed Dutch Church of Fishkill Landing in the future city and the Eustatia home of John Monell, one of St. Anna's vestrymen, was easily recruited to design the new church and rectory due to his devout Episcopalianism and relationships with members of the church. Sargent was, at the time of St. Luke's construction, also a vestryman.

Ground was broken in 1868, and the church officially became St. Luke's Church of Matteawan and the first service was held the following year. The other buildings included the rectory and a small frame schoolhouse where the Parish House now stands. The total construction cost came to $60,000 ($1,450,000 in 2008 dollars). This debt took a while to retire, and as a result the church was not formally consecrated until 1879.

In 1887, fire severely damaged the rectory. The outside was salvaged, but the interior had to be rebuilt. The original floor plan was recreated, but some more contemporary decor was added.

Five years later, in 1892, the church decided to demolish the original schoolhouse and replace it with the Parish House. The building was supposed to be cross-shaped, but that design could not be completed as there was not enough money to complete its construction. The addition of the Great Hall in the 1950s finally completed the original design. During that period, the church building itself also got a new heating system, carpet for the floor under the pews, and the current roof tiles.

== The church today ==
In 2018 St. Luke's merged with St. Andrew's Church, Beacon and both churches became one Parish; St. Andrew and St. Luke Episcopal Church, Beacon NY. The parish continues its worship and ministries, including the food pantry program, and maintains both former church campuses.

== See also ==
- National Register of Historic Places listings in Dutchess County, New York
