= Eustatia =

Historic house in New York, United States

- U.S. National Register of Historic Places
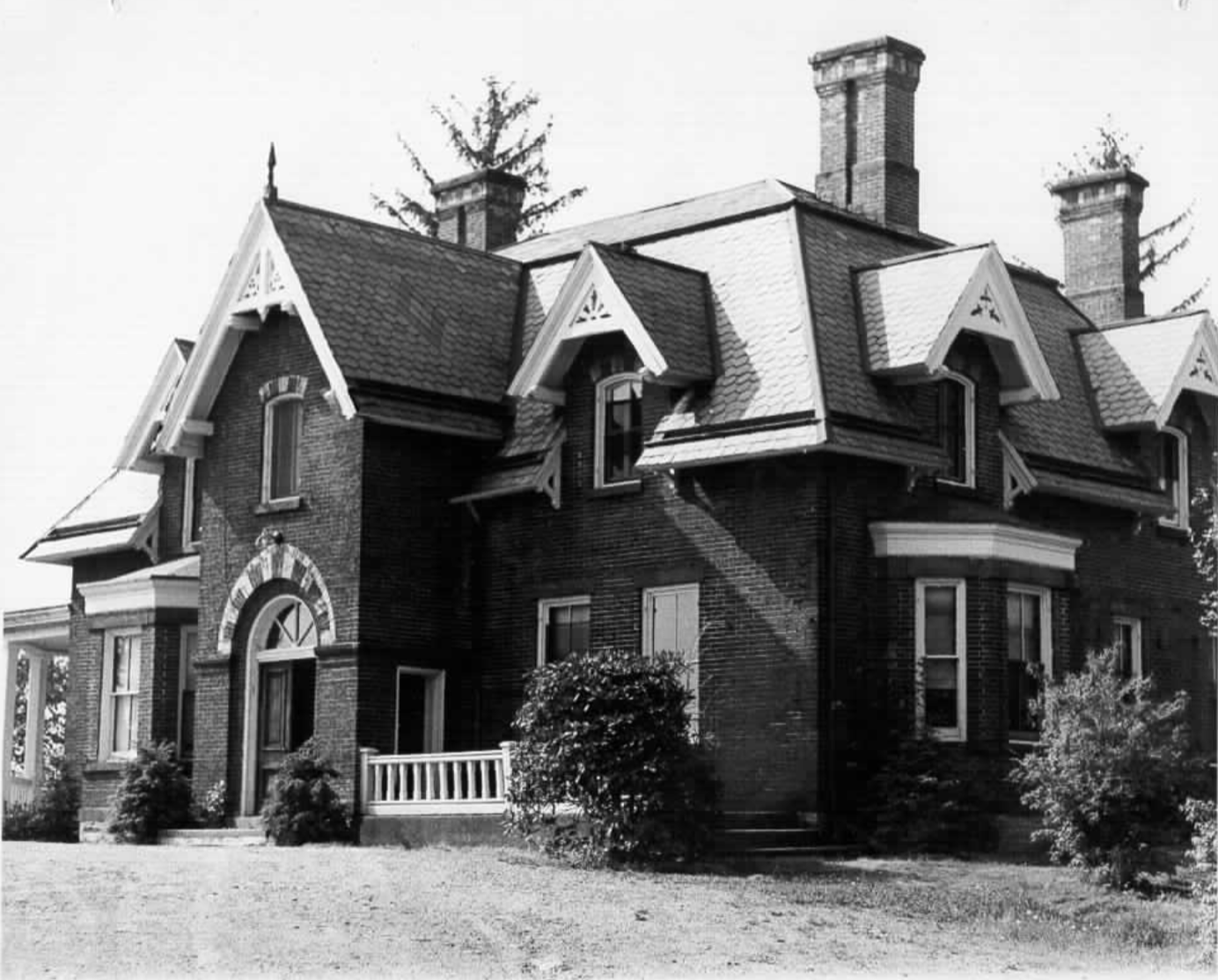
- House in the 1970s
- Location: Beacon, NY
- Coordinates: 41°30′48″N 73°58′58″W
- Built: 1867
- Architect: Frederick Clarke Withers
- Architectural style: High Victorian Gothic
- NRHP reference No.: 79001576
- Added to NRHP: 1979

Eustatia (Greek for "good place to stay") is a brick house overlooking the Hudson River in Beacon, New York, United States. Located on Monell Place in the northwestern corner of the city, it is a rare survival in Beacon of a cottage in the High Victorian Gothic style.

It was built in 1867 to designs by Frederick Clarke Withers for his friend John J. Monell (after whom today's street is named), a New York state judge. Monell had recently married Caroline DeWindt Downing, widow of his friend the influential Newburgh architect Andrew Jackson Downing, with whom Withers had worked. They built the house on property deeded to them by her father, John Peter DeWindt, near her family's own cottage.

As per Withers's specifications, the house is built of red Hudson River brick and light Milwaukee brick for the polychromy. This cream-colored brick he also called for in the construction of his Arcade Building (1871) for Riverside, Illinois, a suburb under development by his once partner Calvert Vaux and Frederick Law Olmsted. Eustatia was notably produced from the office of Vaux, Withers, & Co., the second architectural partnership Withers formed with Vaux; the latter's involvement is unclear.

Withers's design was heavily influenced by concepts from his mentor Downing, and the house appeared in the 1873 edition of Downing's popular Cottage Residences (1842), among many other plans added by George E. Harney. It retains the form and reserve of many of Downing's designs, but adds the "polychromatic enrichment" of the Ruskinian Gothic style Withers had explored in Beacon beginning in 1859 with its Reformed Church. A garden next to the house planned by Henry Winthrop Sargent has been destroyed, but the interior retains many period details such as a tiled marble entry floor and dark walnut moldings after a fire.

Its original form and exterior appearance have remained largely intact since its construction despite subsequent changes in ownership and the addition of modern utilities. In 1979 it was added to the National Register of Historic Places.

The house is named for Eustatia Island, a 30-acre island of the British Virgin Islands (BVI) in the Caribbean where DeWindt's family had once lived as Dutch immigrants.

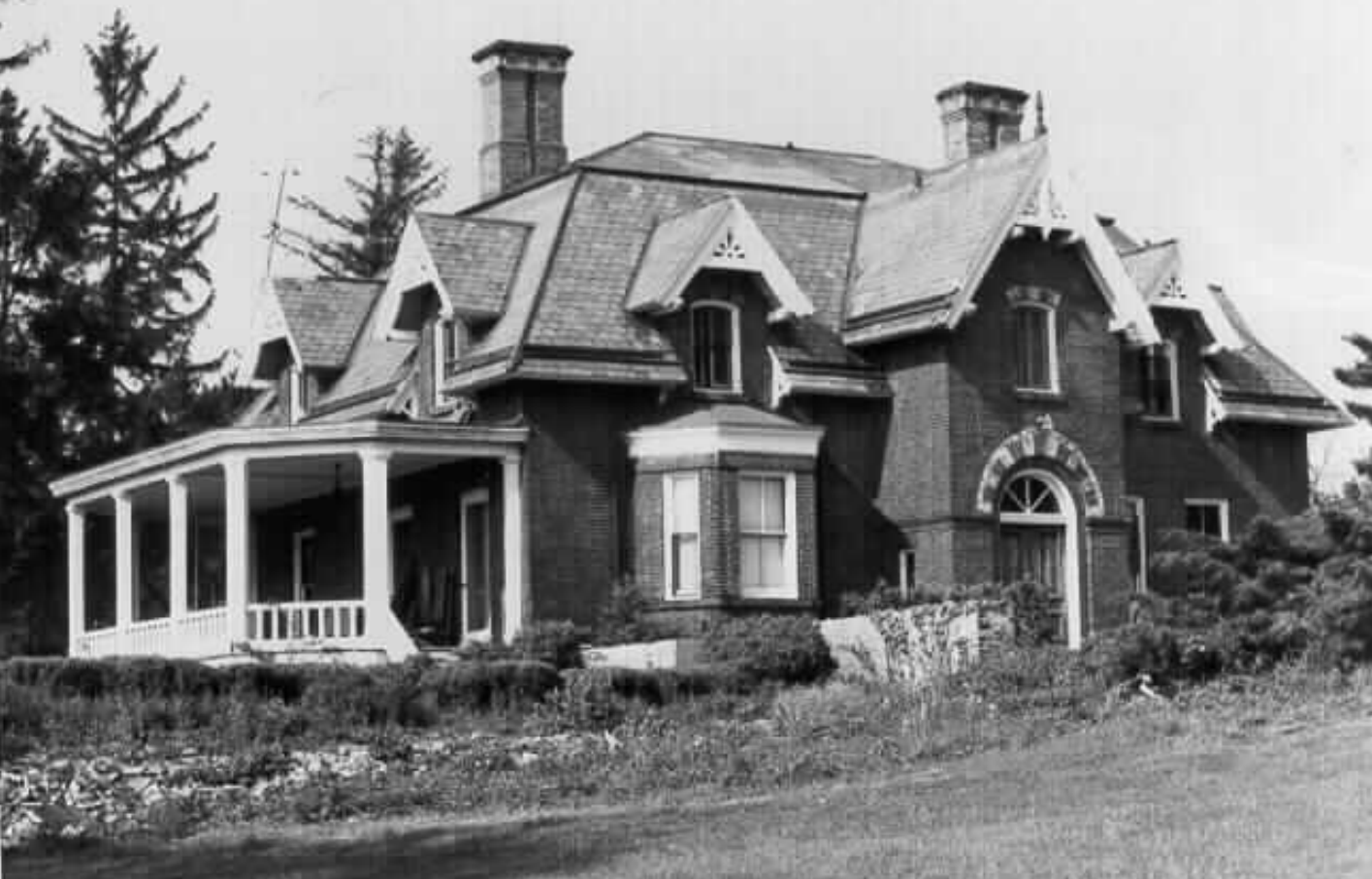
Original veranda and riverfront elevation

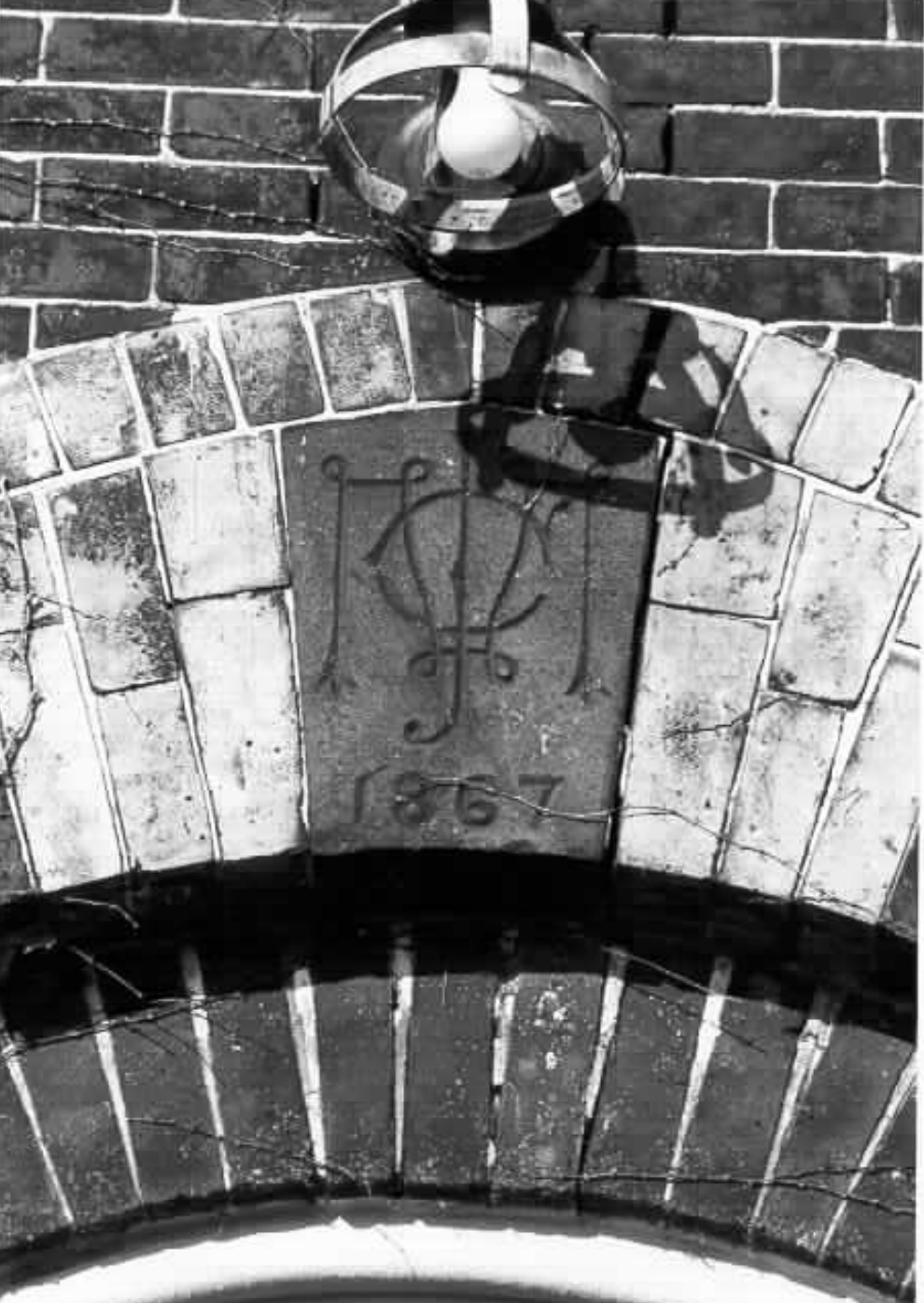
Keystone carved with intertwined initials of Caroline and John Monell

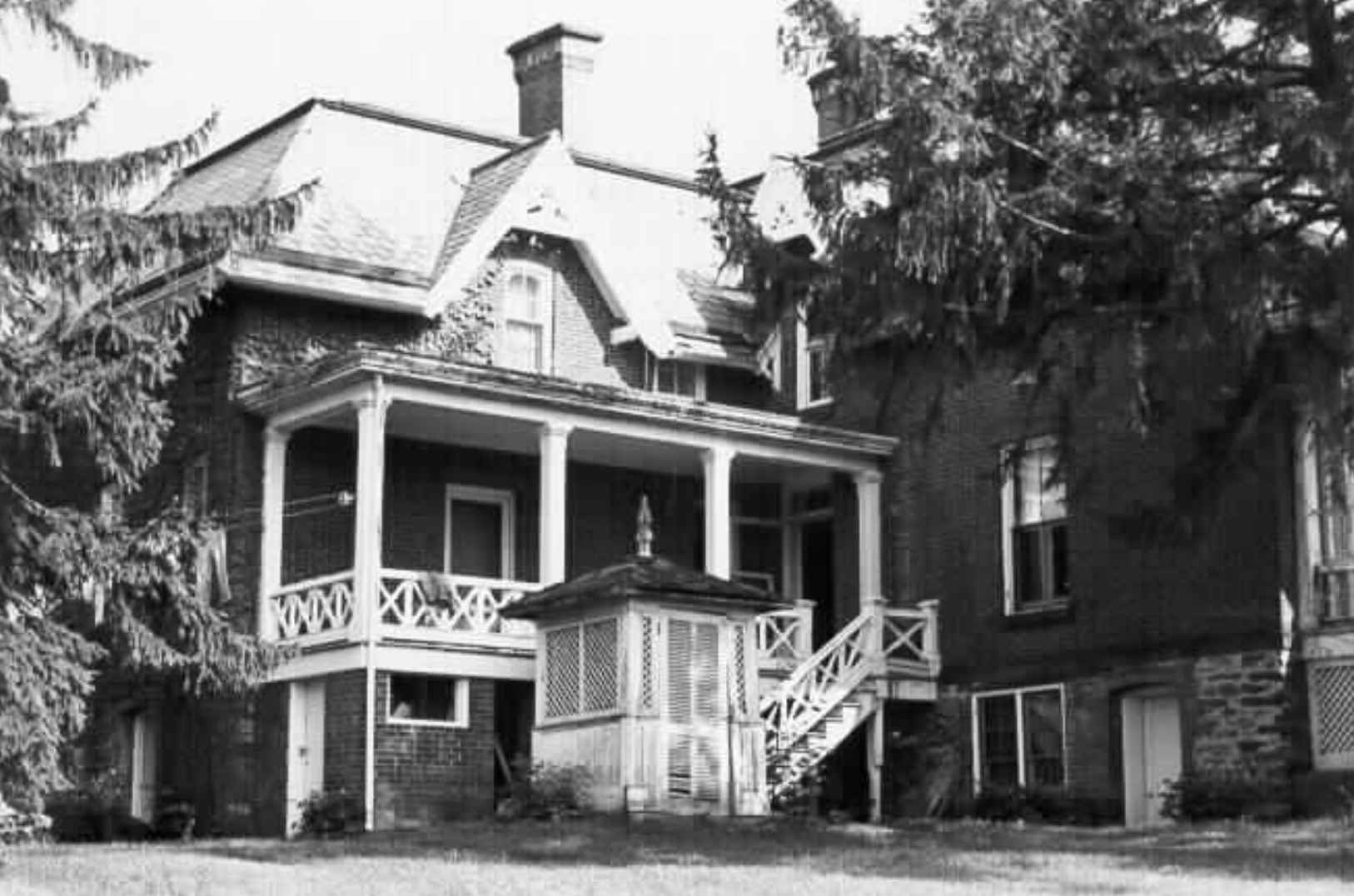
Rear of Monell house with balustrades
