= Frederick Clarke Withers =

British-American architect (1828–1901)

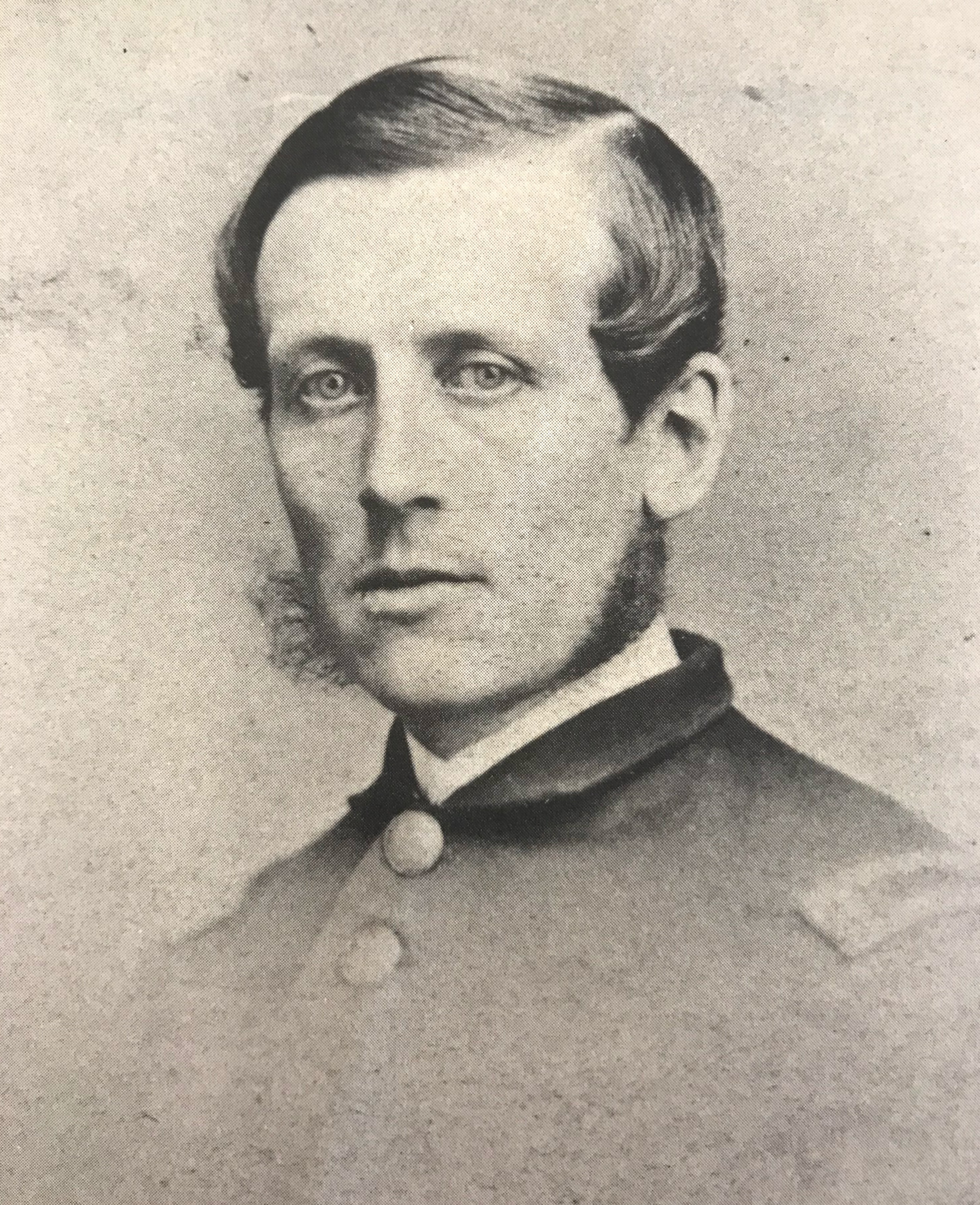
- Withers in Union Army uniform, 1861
- Born: 4 February 1828; Shepton Mallet, Somersetshire, England
- Died: 7 January 1901 (aged 72); Yonkers, New York, U.S.
- Occupation: Architect
- Practice: 1854–1901
- Buildings: Halsey Stevens House; Reformed Church of Beacon; Eustatia; Jefferson Market Courthouse; Chapel of the Good Shepherd
- Projects: Gallaudet University; Hudson River State Hospital; Astor Memorial Reredos

Frederick Clarke Withers (4 February 1828 – 7 January 1901) was an English architect in America, especially renowned for his Gothic Revival ecclesiastical designs. For portions of his professional career, he partnered with fellow immigrant Calvert Vaux; both worked in the office of Andrew Jackson Downing in Newburgh, New York, where they began their careers following Downing's accidental death. Withers greatly participated in the introduction of the High Victorian Gothic style to the United States.

== Biography ==
Frederick Clarke Withers was born in Shepton Mallet, Somersetshire. He had a brother, Robert Jewell Withers, who also became an architect. He studied architecture in England for eight years under Thomas Henry Wyatt. He came to the United States in February 1852 at the invitation of the prominent American horticulturist and burgeoning architect Andrew Jackson Downing. Withers and Downing later became family, as they married sisters: Emily Augusta and Caroline Elizabeth DeWindt, respectively. The sisters were great-grandchildren of President John Adams, and grandnieces of John Quincy Adams. Downing drowned a few months after Withers joined his office on July 28, 1852, attempting to save his mother-in-law in the explosion of the steamboat Henry Clay.

Calvert Vaux, Downing's partner, then took Withers in as an assistant and later partner by 1854. Vaux included a design for a bookcase credited to Withers among those in his Villas and Cottages (1857), which records both designs of the firms Downing & Vaux and Vaux & Withers. A year prior to publication, Vaux dissolved the practice and left for New York City. Withers began plans for his first independent commissions, a series of country houses for clients in adjacent Balmville. His library for the Frederick Deming House, "Morningside" (1859–60) was deemed architecturally significant by the Metropolitan Museum of Art in the late 1970s and removed for display. One of Withers's most radical and linear villas of these years was "Tioronda" (1859–60), built for Joseph Howland and his wife Eliza Newton Woolsey in present-day Beacon, New York. Set within a landscape by Henry Winthrop Sargent, Tioronda marked Withers's maturity as an architect and picturesque designer trained in Downing's vision.

At the outset of the American Civil War, Withers volunteered and received a commission as a lieutenant in the 1st New York Volunteer Engineer Regiment. This experience added invaluable engineering experience to his architectural expertise. After 1863, he moved his practice to New York City from Newburgh. As an independent architect in New York working largely in the Gothic Revival mode, Withers wrote about architecture and designed in the highly colored Ruskinian Gothic manner. His first commission in 1859 for a High Victorian Gothic building, the Reformed Church of Beacon (1860) was likely secured through the congregation's associations with John Peter DeWindt, his father-in-law. Others in this style, such as the nearby Tioronda School (1865), were recognized by the National Academy of Design in 1866.

When A. J. Bicknell published Withers's Church Architecture (1873), featuring the school, the architect's reputation was secured. Among his prestigious commissions in New York was the William Backhouse Astor, Sr. Memorial Altar and Reredos (1876–77) at Trinity Church. Withers's only cast-iron building stands at 448 Broome Street, Manhattan, but many of his urban designs went unrealized. By the 1880s he had separated from Vaux and worked in partnership with Walter Dickson (1835–1903), originally from Albany, New York.

A number of Withers's works are listed on the National Register of Historic Places (NRHP) and further honored as National Historic Landmarks.

== Jefferson Market Courthouse ==
Under the firm Vaux, Withers & Co., Withers designed his most famous building, the Jefferson Market Courthouse, built in 1874 on 10th St. in Greenwich Village, New York next to the Jefferson Market Prison. The Courthouse was made for the Third Judicial District and designed in the High Victorian Gothic style. The building was called "Jefferson Market" because the site chosen, in 1870 was at the time the Jefferson Market, the local produce market. The frieze on the outside of the building contains scenes from Shakespeare's Merchant of Venice.

== Selected architectural works ==
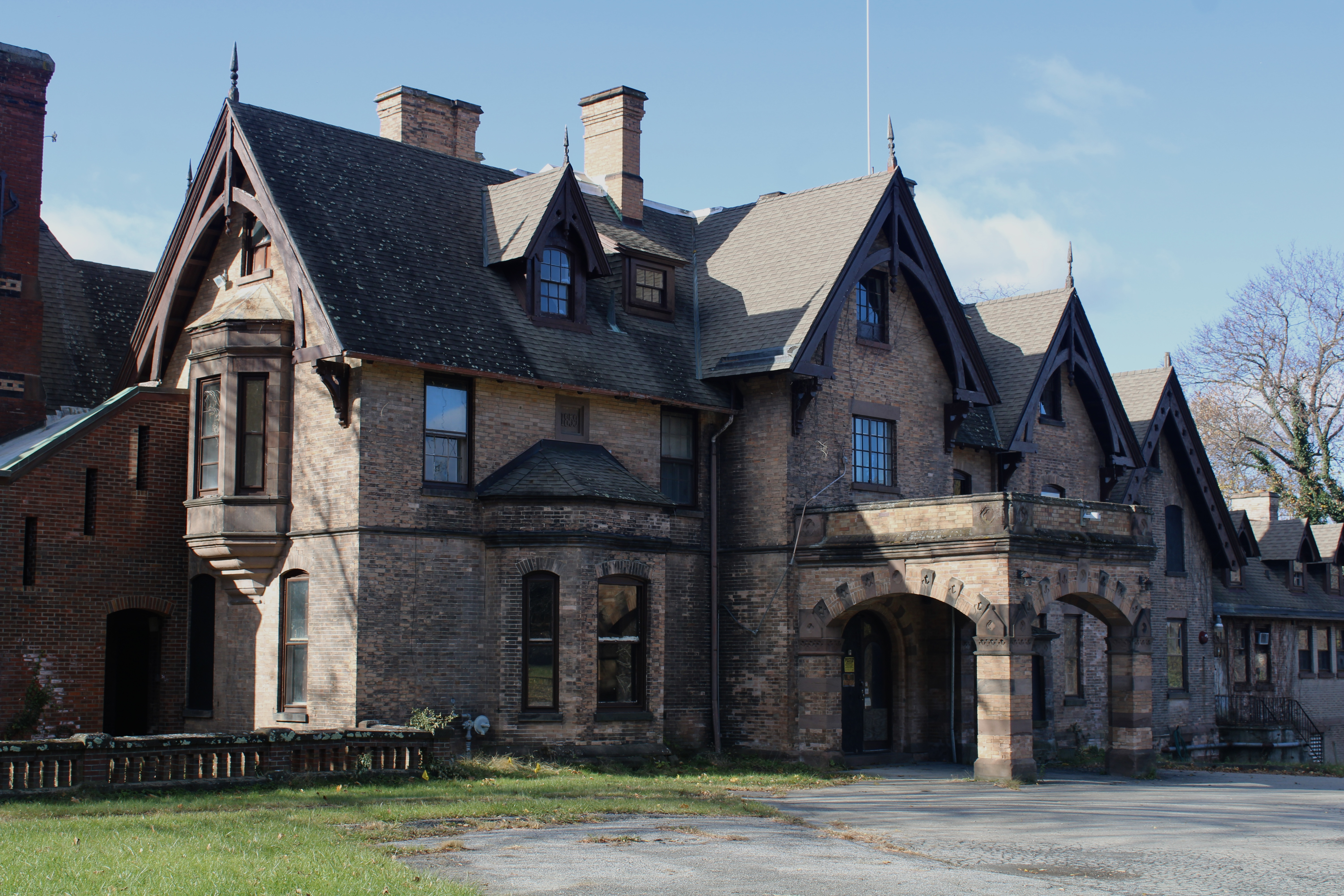
- Joseph Howland House, "Tioronda" (1859–60)
  Halsey Stevens House, Newburgh, NY (1855), with Vaux
- Daniel B. St. John House, "The Rest," Balmville, NY (1856)
- David M. Clarkson House, "Glenbrook," Balmville, NY (1857)
- Calvary Presbyterian Church, Newburgh, NY (1857–58)
- St. Michael's Episcopal Church, Germantown, PA (1858)
- Walter S. Vail House, "Maple Lawn," Balmville, NY (1859–60)
- Reformed Church of Beacon, Beacon, NY (planned 1859; 1860)
- Joseph Howland House, "Tioronda," Beacon, New York (1859–60)
- Frederick Deming House, "Morningside," Newburgh, NY (1859–60)
- St. Mark's Episcopal Church, Shreveport, LA (1860)
- St. Paul's Episcopal Church, Newburgh, NY (begun 1864; unfinished)
- College Hall, Gallaudet University (1875)
  Eugene A. Brewster House, Newburgh, NY (1865)
- Tioranda School, Beacon, NY (1865)
- Charles Kimball House, Brooklyn, NY (1865, demolished)
- Newburgh Savings Bank, Newburgh, NY (1866–68, demolished)
- John J. Monell House, "Eustatia," Beacon, New York (1867)
- Chapel Hall, Gallaudet University, Washington, DC (1868–69)
- First Presbyterian Church of Highland Falls, Highland Falls, NY (1868–69)
- Administration Building, Hudson River State Hospital, Poughkeepsie, NY (1868–71)
- President's House, Gallaudet College, Washington, DC (planned 1867; 1868)
- St. Luke's Episcopal Church and rectory, Beacon, NY (1868–70)
- Maj. James Goodwin House, Hartford, CT (1870, demolished)
- Arcade Building, Riverside, Illinois (1871)
- St. Thomas Episcopal Church, Hanover, NH (1872)
- Stephen L. Thurlow House, Wilkes-Barre, PA (1873–74)
- Jefferson Market Courthouse, New York, NY (1874–79)
- College Hall, Gallaudet University, Washington, DC (1875)
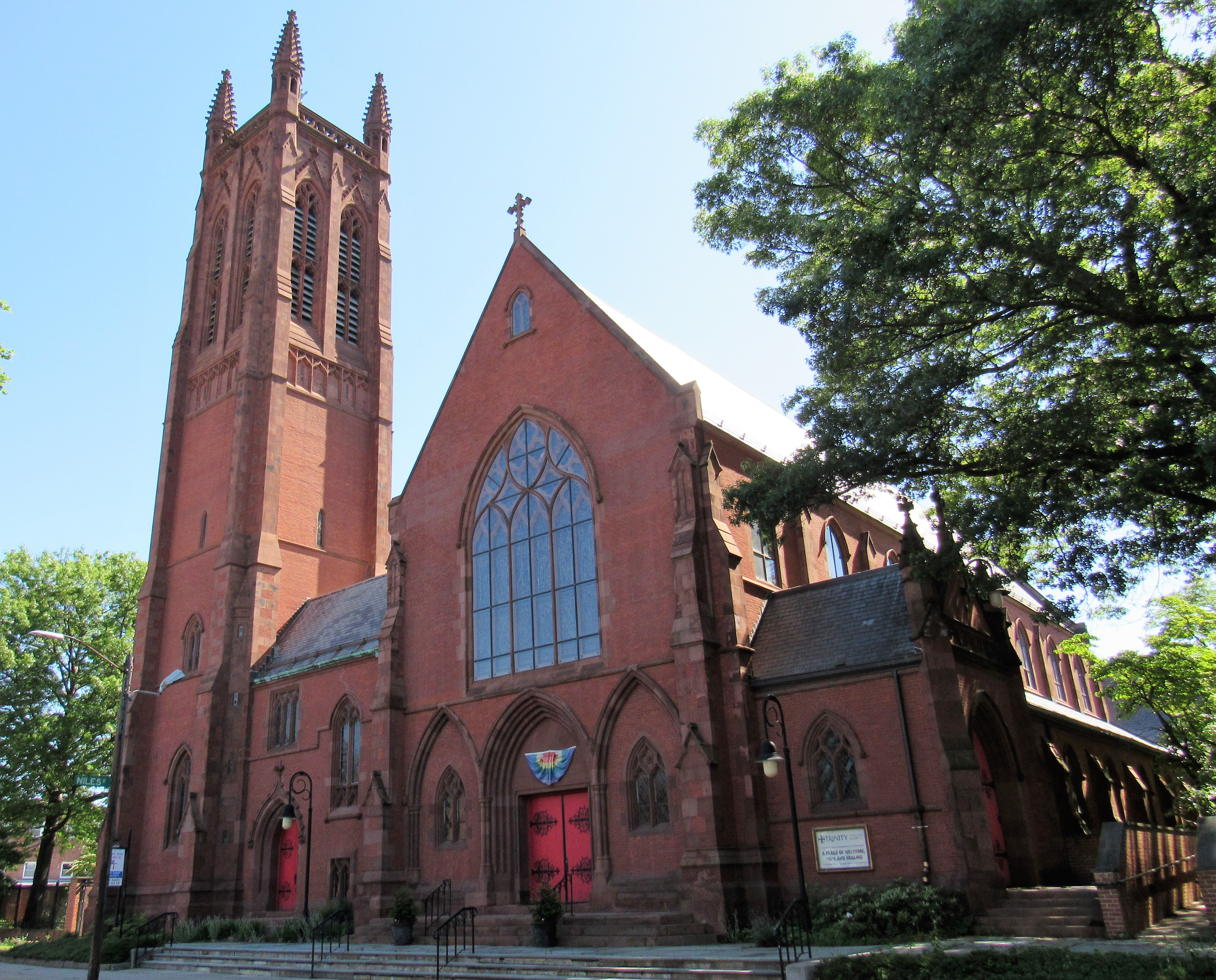
  Trinity Episcopal Church (1892–93)
- Addition, memorial reredos and altar, Trinity Church, New York, NY (1876–77)
- Gymnasium, Gallaudet University, Washington, DC (1880)
- Huntington Free Library and Reading Room, Westchester Square, Bronx, NY (1882–83)
- Weehawken Water Tower, Weehawken, NJ (1883)
- Heppenheimer Mansion, Van Vorst Park, Jersey City, NJ (1884)
- Admiral John Henry Upshur House, now United States Daughters of 1812, National Headquarters, Washington, DC (1884)
- Frank Hasbrouck House, Poughkeepsie, NY (1885)
- Stable, James Roosevelt Estate, "Springwood," Hyde Park, NY (1886)
- Episcopal Church of the Advent, Louisville, KY (1887)
- Chapel of the Good Shepherd, Roosevelt Island), New York, NY (1888–89)
- Trinity Episcopal Church, Hartford, CT (1892–93)
- Zabriskie Memorial Church of St. John the Evangelist, Newport, RI (1894)
- Lynchgate, Church of the Transfiguration and Rectory, New York, NY (1896)
- The Tombs (Manhattan House of Detention), New York, NY (1902, demolished)

== Writings ==
- "A Few Hints on Church Building" in The Horticulturist, 1858
- Church Architecture, New York: A. J. Bicknell & Co., 1873

== Gallery ==
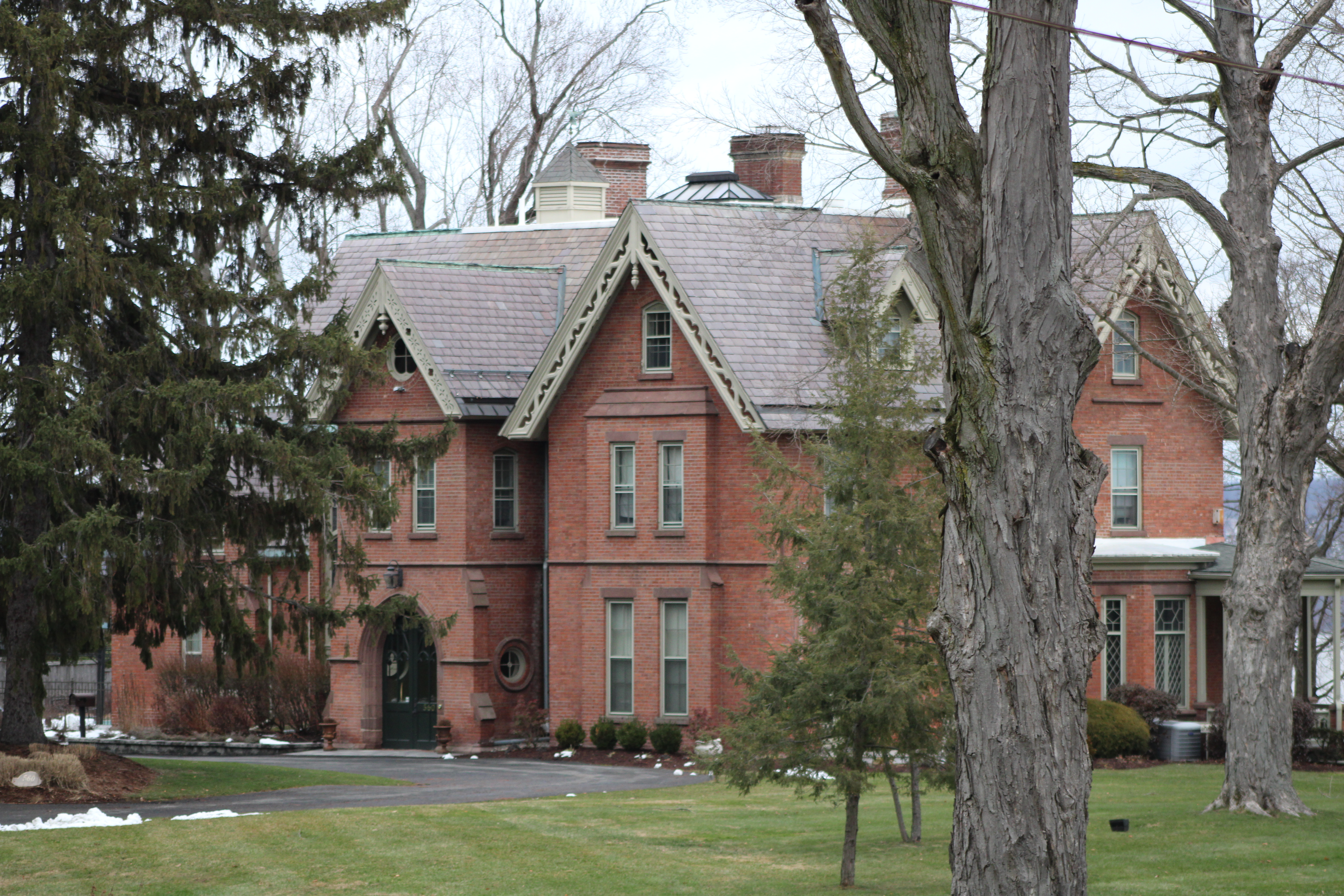
Daniel B. St. John House, "The Rest" (1856)

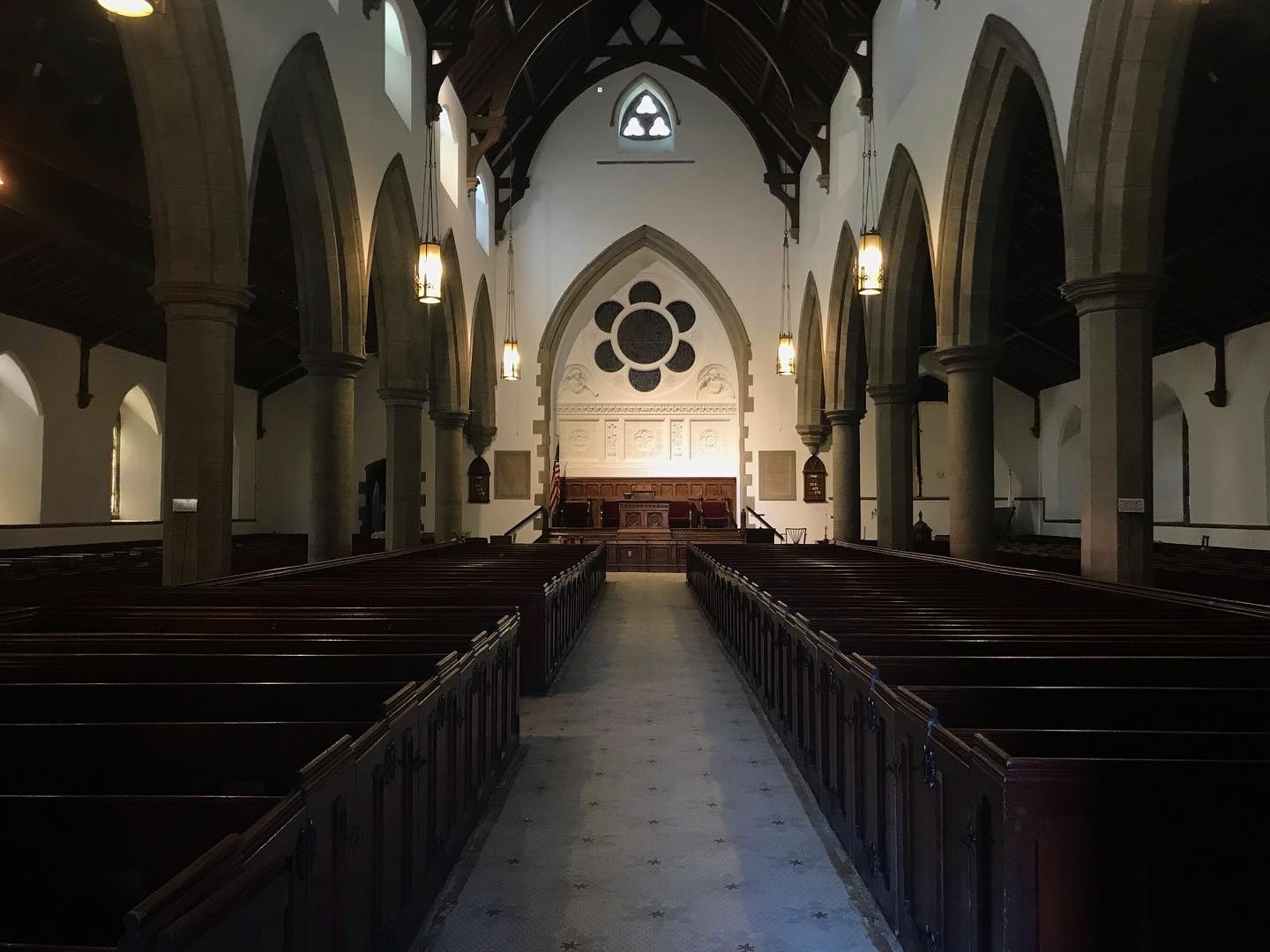
Nave, Calvary Presbyterian Church (1857–58)

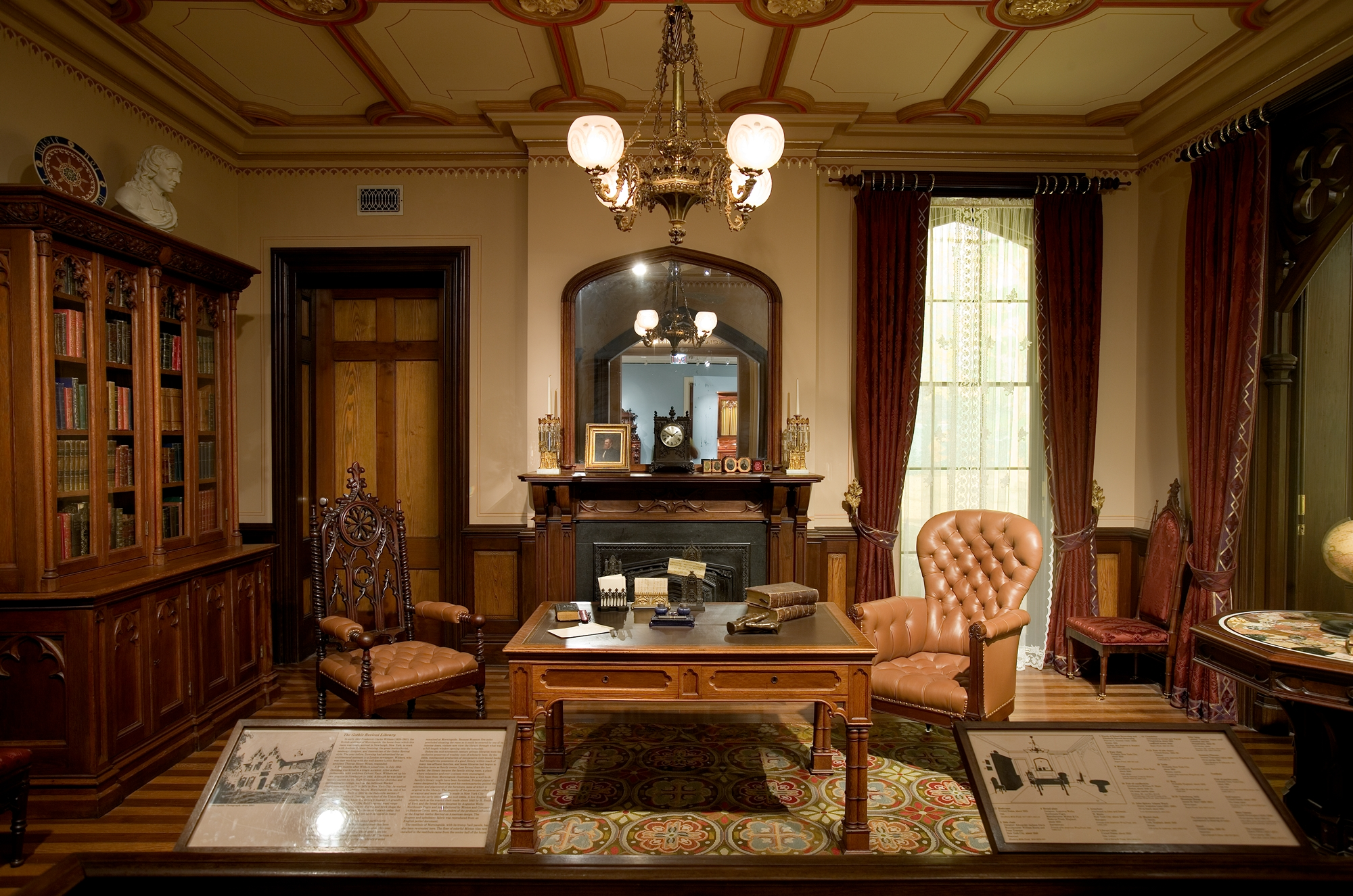
Library from Frederick Deming House, "Morningside" (1859–60)

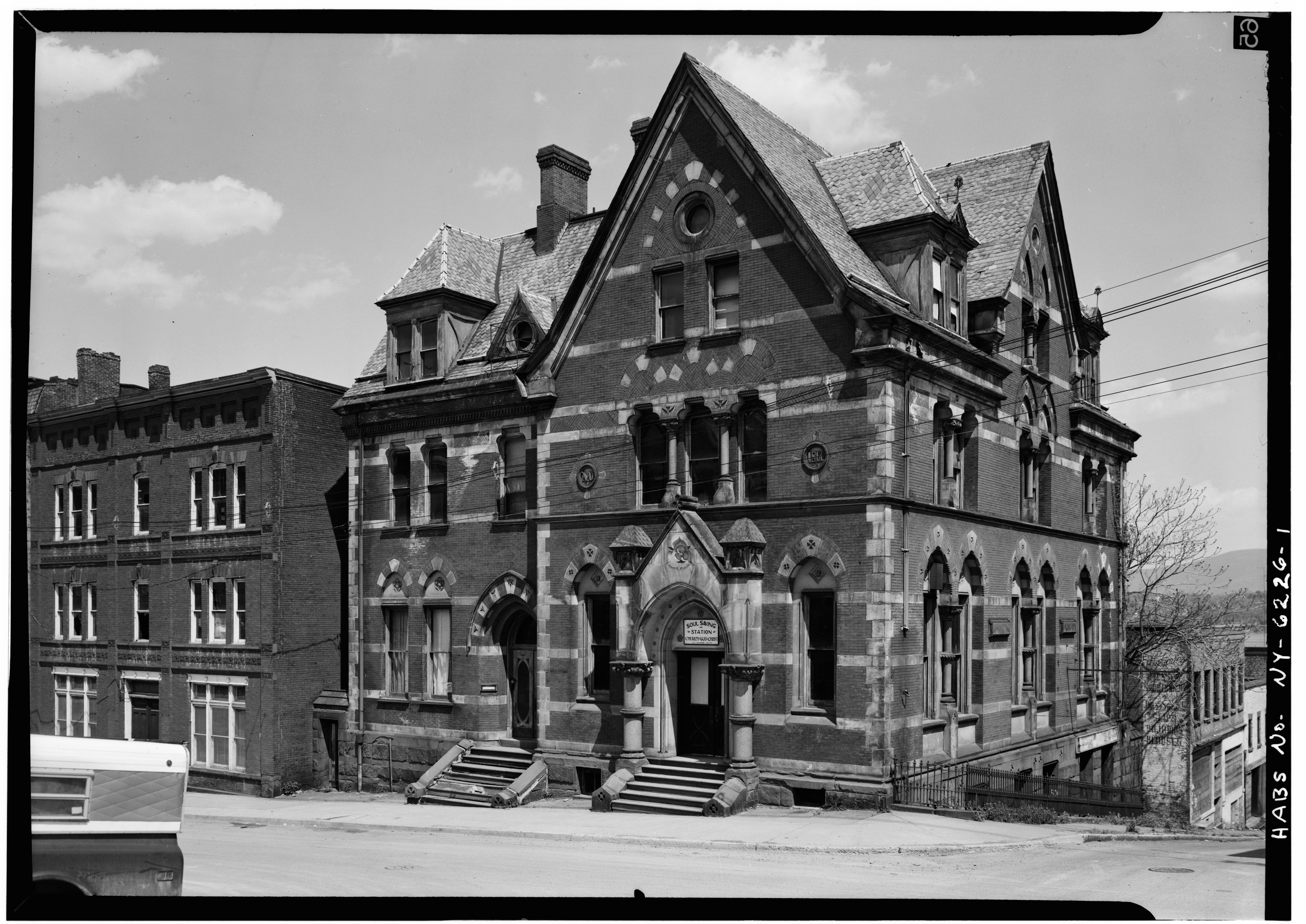
Newburgh Savings Bank (1866–68)

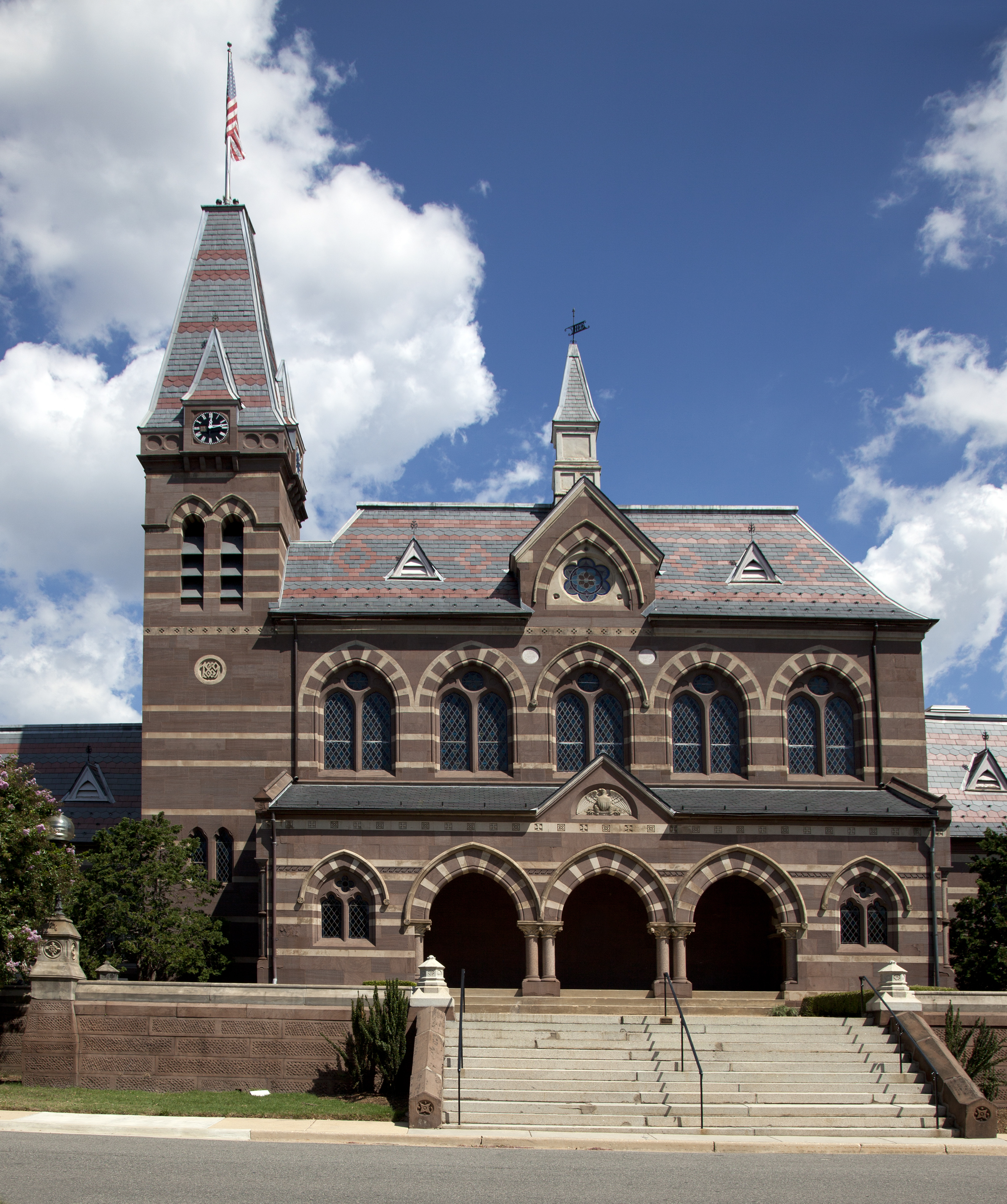
Chapel Hall, Gallaudet University (1868–69)

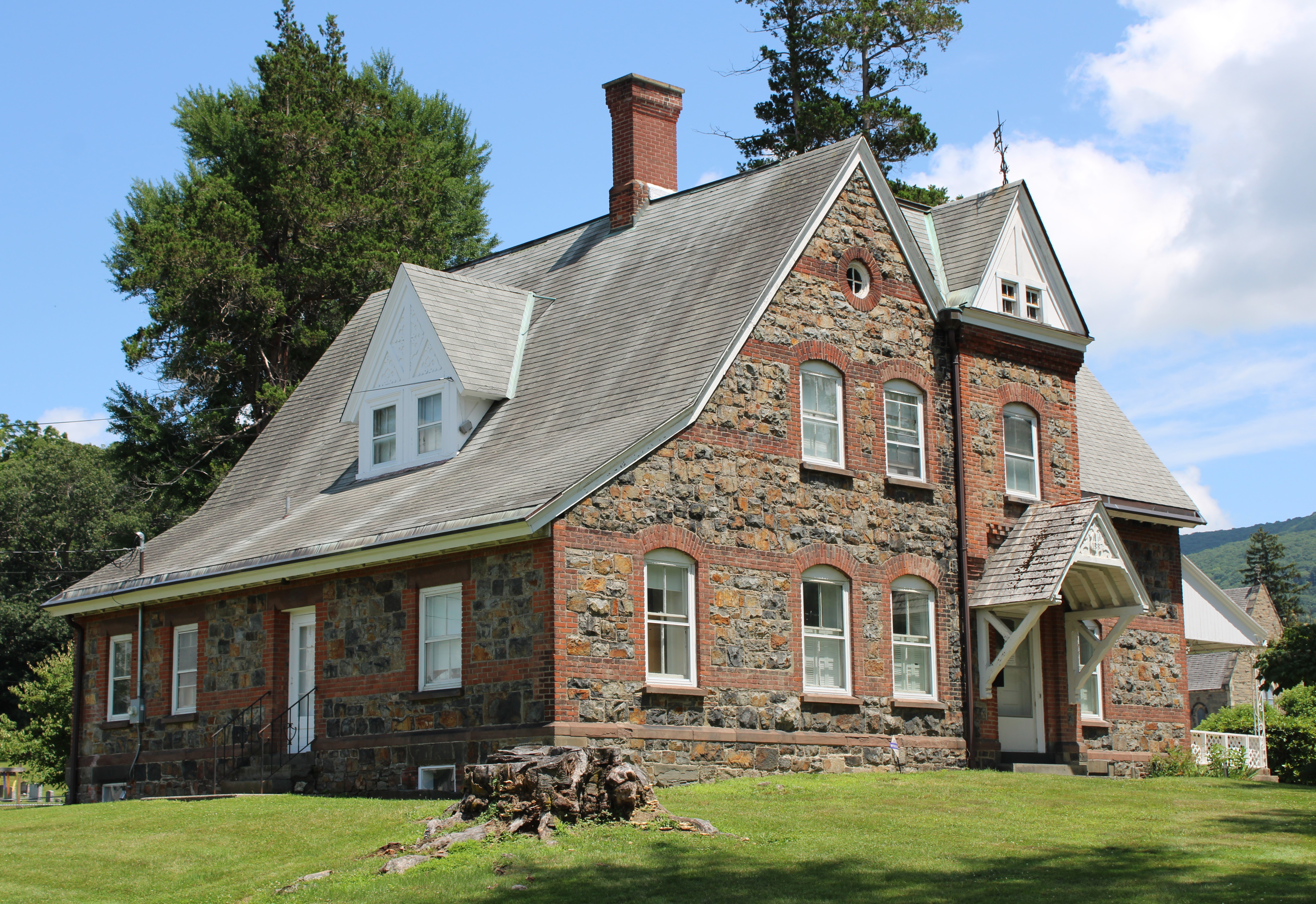
St. Luke's Episcopal Church Rectory (1869)

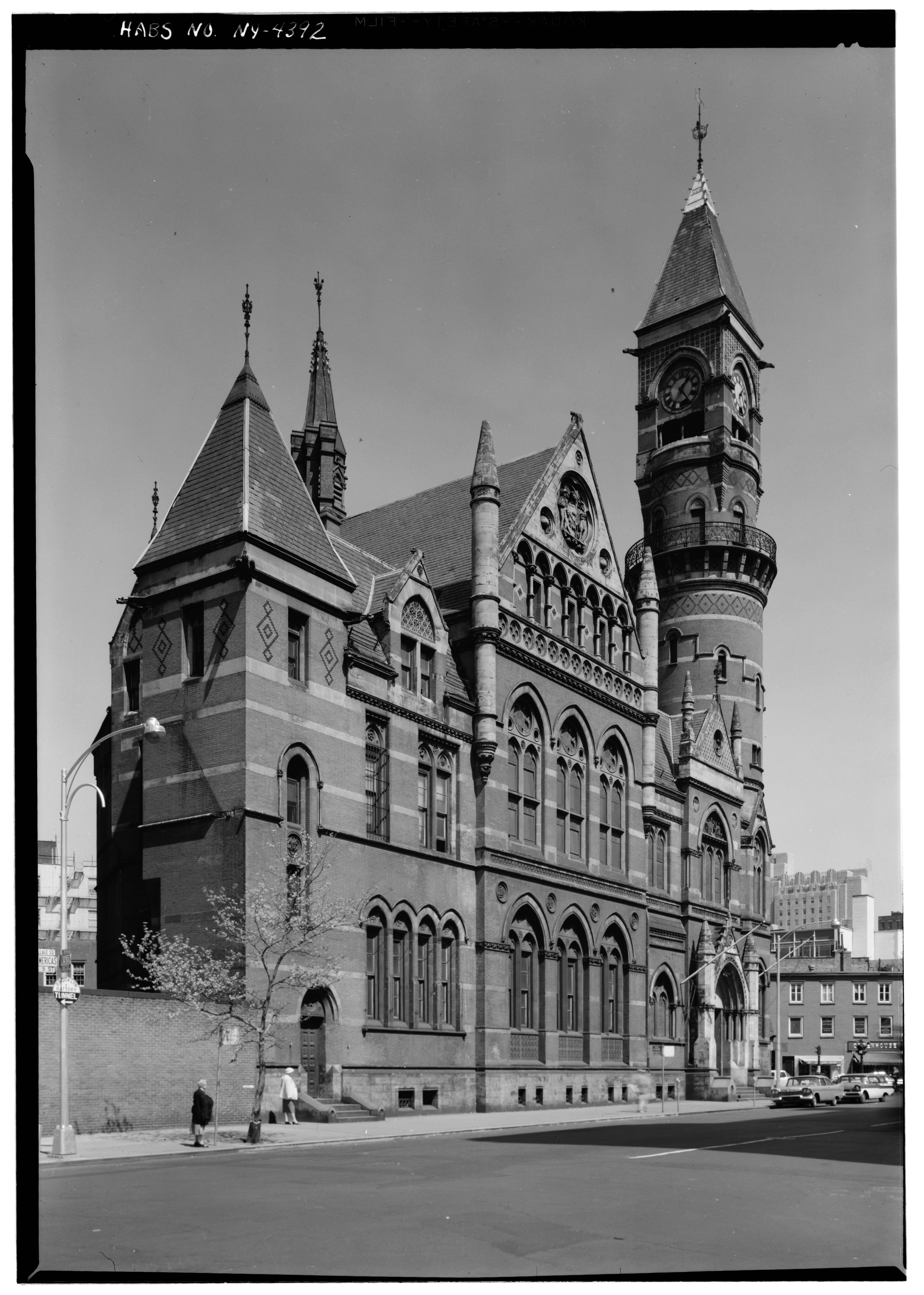
Jefferson Market Courthouse (1874–79)

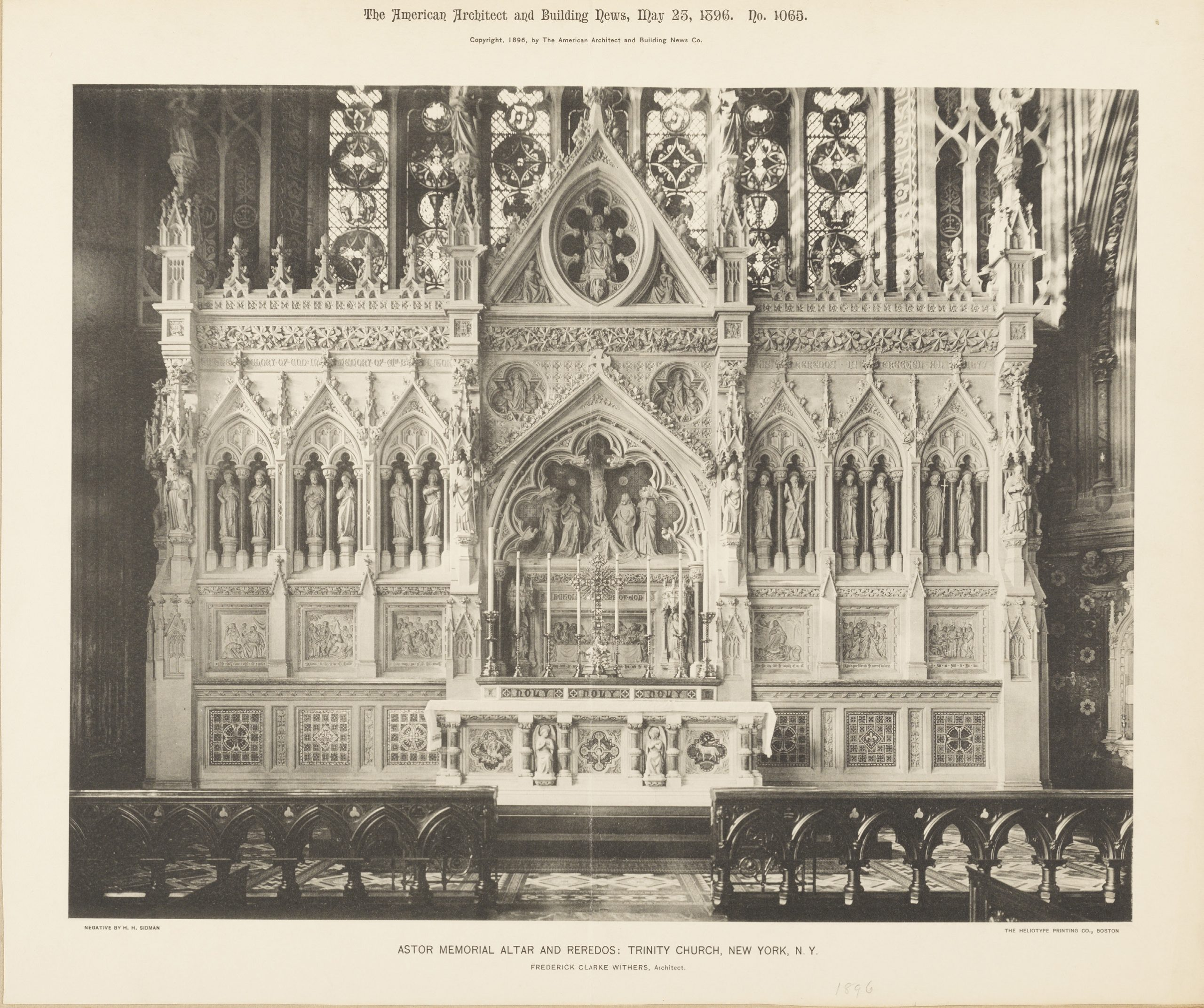
Astor Reredos, Trinity Church (1876–77)

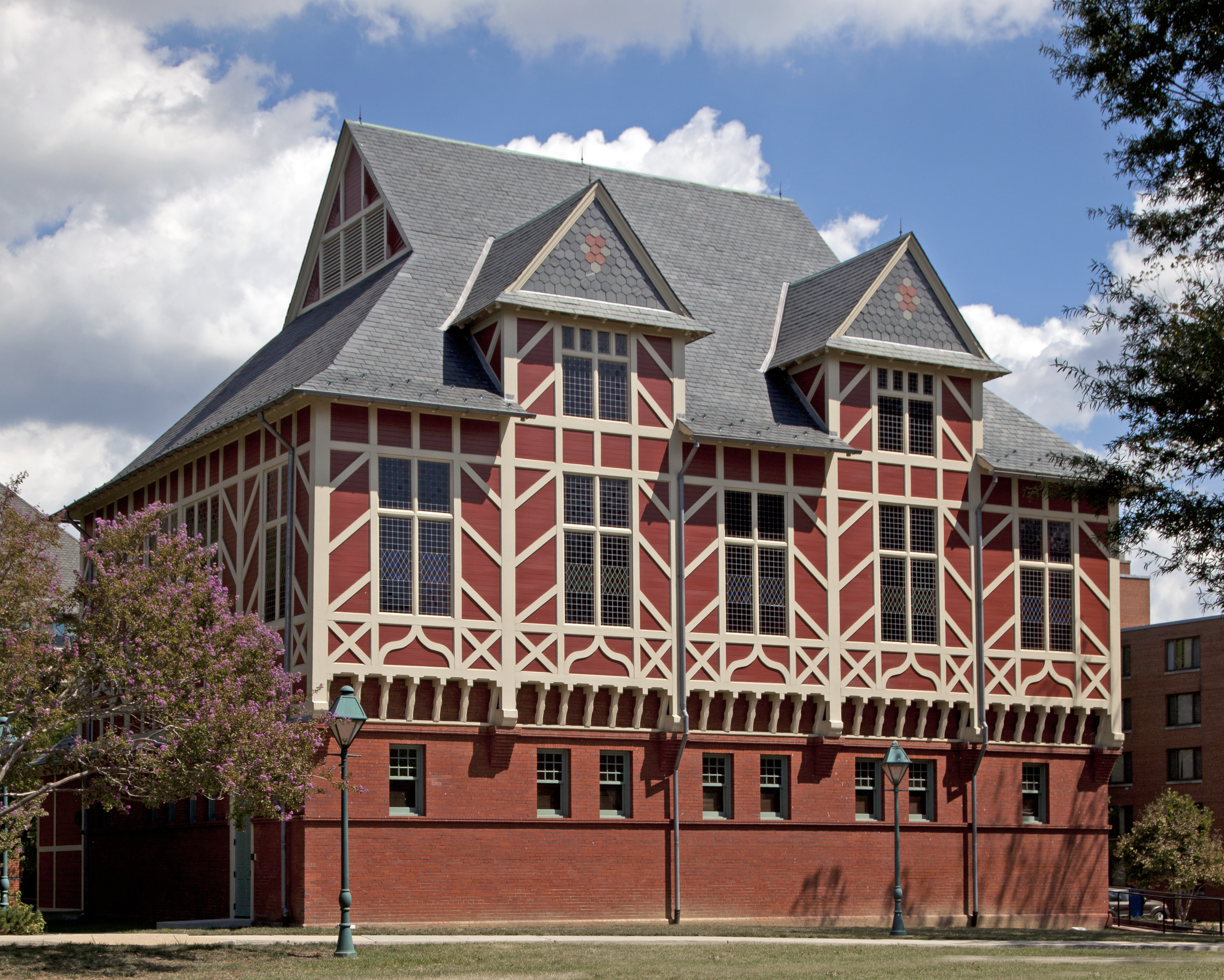
Gymnasium, Gallaudet University (1880)

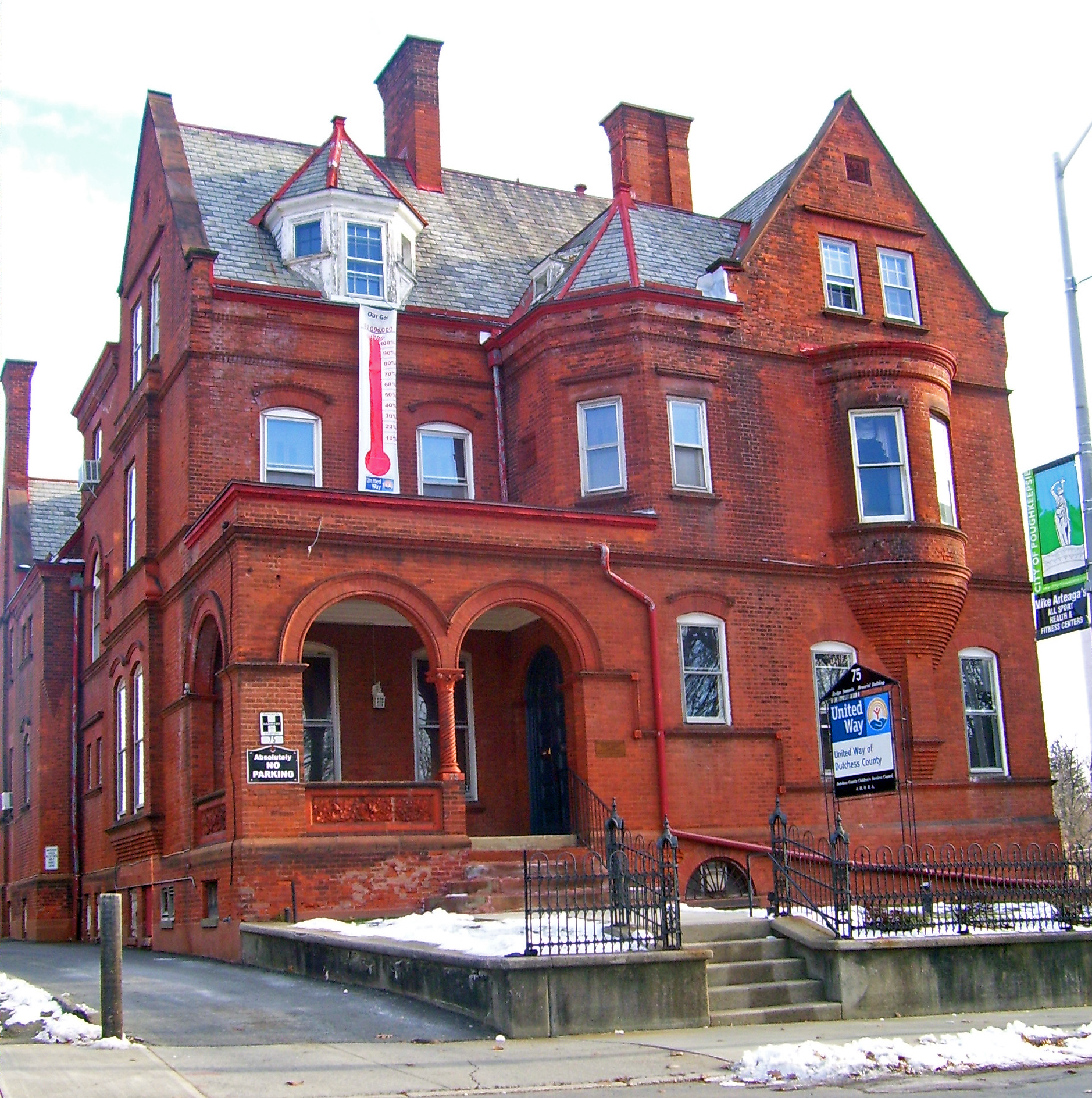
Frank Hasbrouck House (1885)

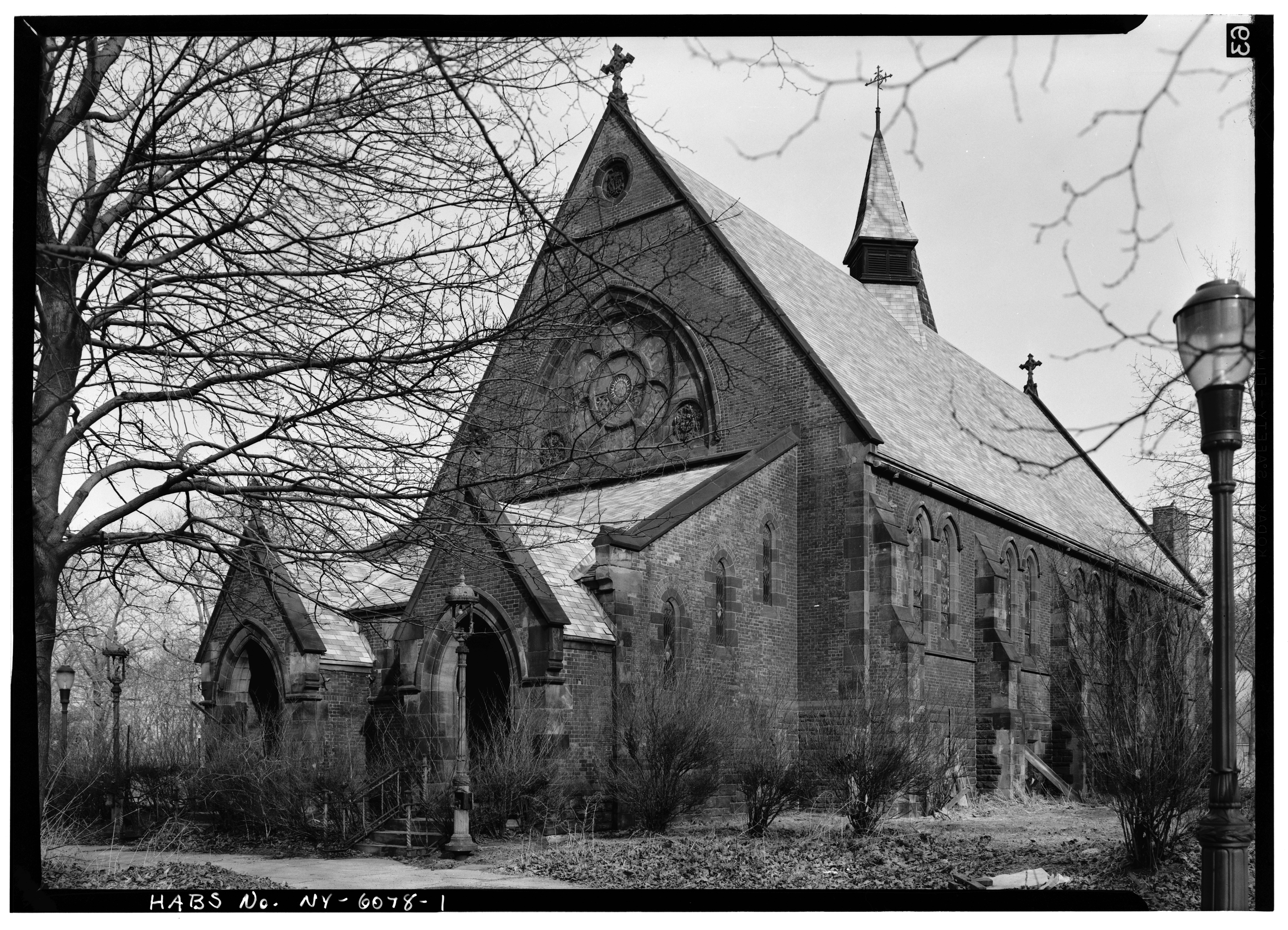
Chapel of the Good Shepherd (1888–89)

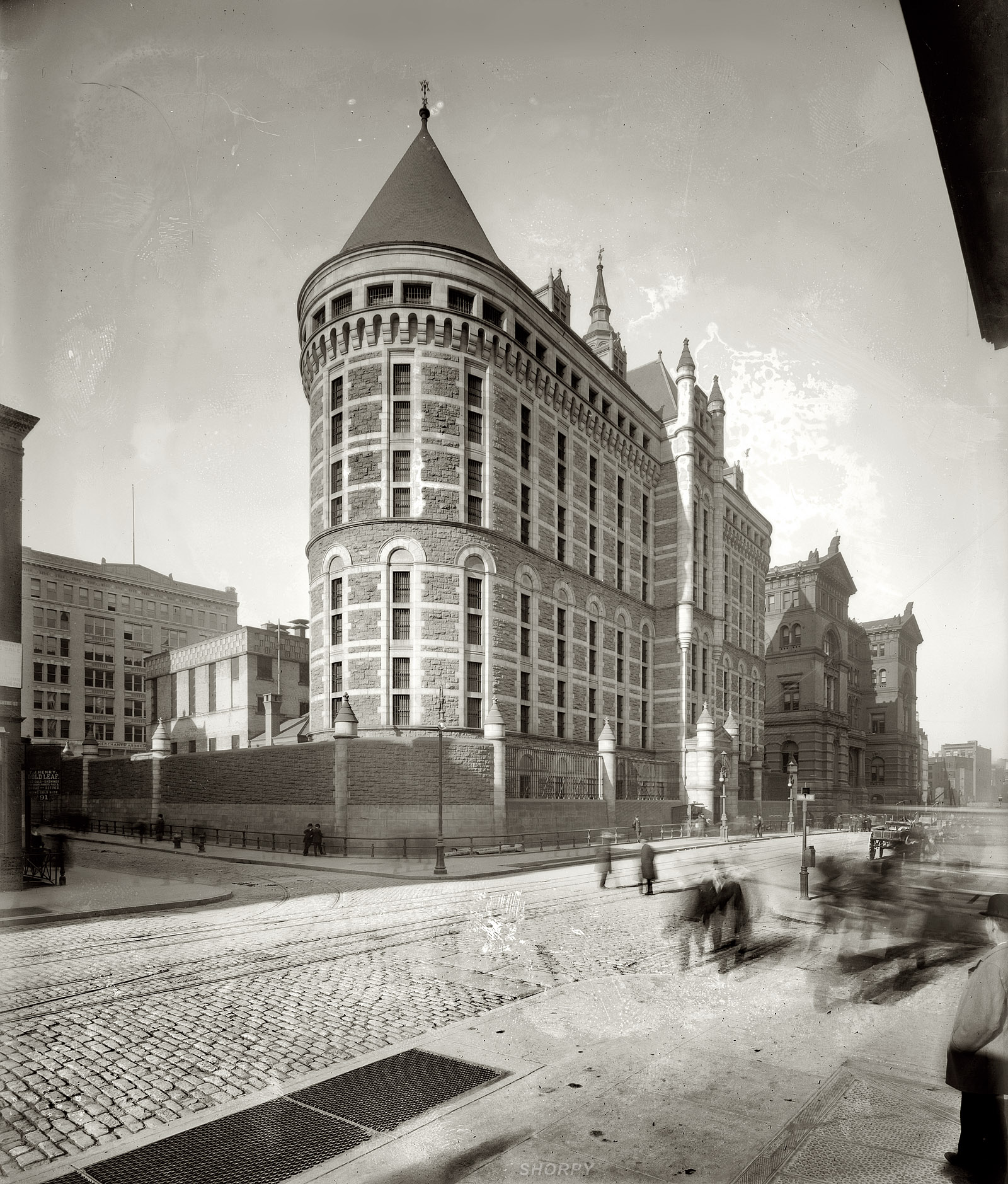
The Tombs (1902)

== Bibliography ==
- Francis R. Kowsky, The Architecture of Frederick Clarke Withers and the Progress of the Gothic Revival in America after 1850 (Middletown, CT: Wesleyan University Press, 1980)
- John Zukowsky and Robbe Pierce Stimson, Hudson River Villas (New York: Rizzoli International Publications, 1985)
