= Reformed Church of Beacon =

Historic church in New York, United States

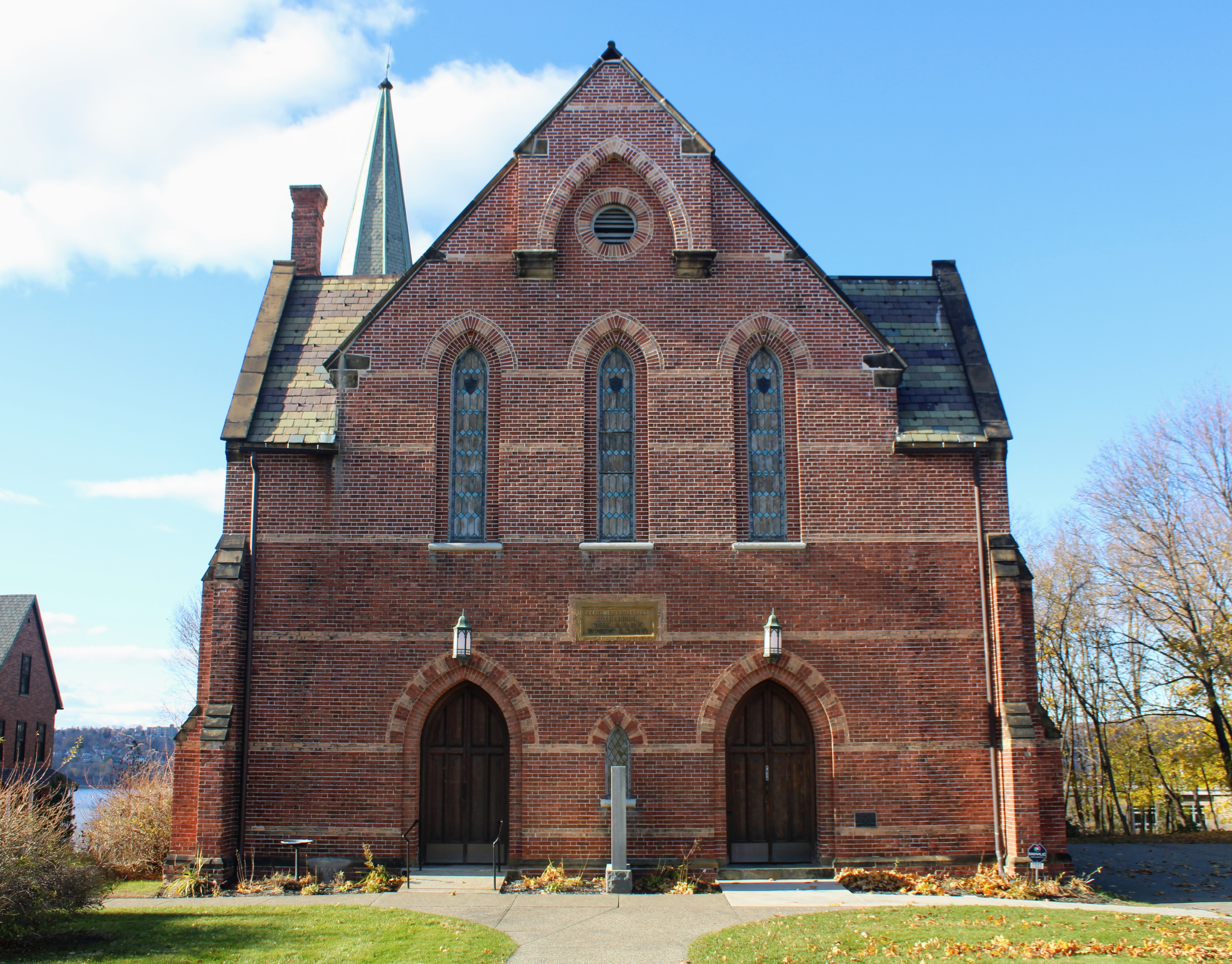
- East elevation, 2021

Religion
- Affiliation: Reformed Church in America

Location
- Location: Beacon, NY, United States
- Interactive map of Reformed Church of Beacon
- Coordinates: 41°30′23″N 73°58′49″W

Architecture
- Architect: Frederick Clarke Withers
- Type: Church
- Style: High Victorian Gothic
- General contractor: J.F. Gerow, Samuel Bogardus
- Completed: 1860

Specifications
- Direction of façade: East
- Materials: Brick

U.S. National Register of Historic Places
- Added to NRHP: 1988
- NRHP Reference no.: 88001438

Website
- Reformed Church of Beacon

The Reformed Church of Beacon, originally the Reformed Dutch Church of Fishkill Landing, is a historic and architecturally-significant church in Beacon, New York. The congregation, who no longer occupies the building, claims it is the oldest church in Beacon. It is located on NY 9D about 0.5 miles (1 km) south of Beacon's municipal complex and downtown area and overlooks the Hudson River from a bluff.

It was designed by Frederick Clarke Withers and built in 1860 using the High Victorian Gothic style, one of its earliest uses in the United States. The church and its cemetery were added to the National Register of Historic Places in 1988. It is one of three Withers buildings in the city on the Register and a rare example of his church architecture in this style.

== Property ==
=== Church ===
The church and cemetery are on a 2.2-acre (8,900 m^{2}) lot between Ferry (Route 9D) and Beekman streets. It is level and clear on the east, where the church is, but then wooded and sloped to the west, where the cemetery is. There is a parking lot to the north, and the church's former parsonage.

Two and a half stories in height and seven by four bays, the church is made from red brick laid in English bond. The main entrance, two large Gothic wooden paneled doors with a small Gothic window between them, is on the east. All but one of the side bays have a large Gothic window with a buttress between them. The west elevation is fully fenestrated, and a small wing projects to south. Near it, the church's spire, a later addition, rises.

Inside, a red carpet covers the wooden floor under the sanctuary's 98 oak pews. The walls are plaster, covered to a certain level with narrow vertical wainscoting. They rise to a vaulted wooden ceiling with large trusses. In the rear, behind the altar, are the pipes of the church's manual-tracker pipe organ, the only one in the Hudson Valley. A small gallery, presently the choir room, is off the main entrance. On the west end is a larger room, used as a Sunday school and lecture hall. It is decorated with similar materials as the sanctuary except the wood is painted white and the plaster blue. From the south side, a small kitchen and hallway offer stairs to both the basement and bell tower.

=== Cemetery and parsonage ===
The cemetery is on the section of land from just west of the church wall to near Beekman Street, downhill. Its graves date from 1813 to the early 20th century, representing the range of funerary art common from those eras. It is overgrown and in some disrepair. Notable burials include Abraham H. Schenck, James Mackin and William Few who has since been reinterred at Saint Paul's Church, Augusta, Georgia.

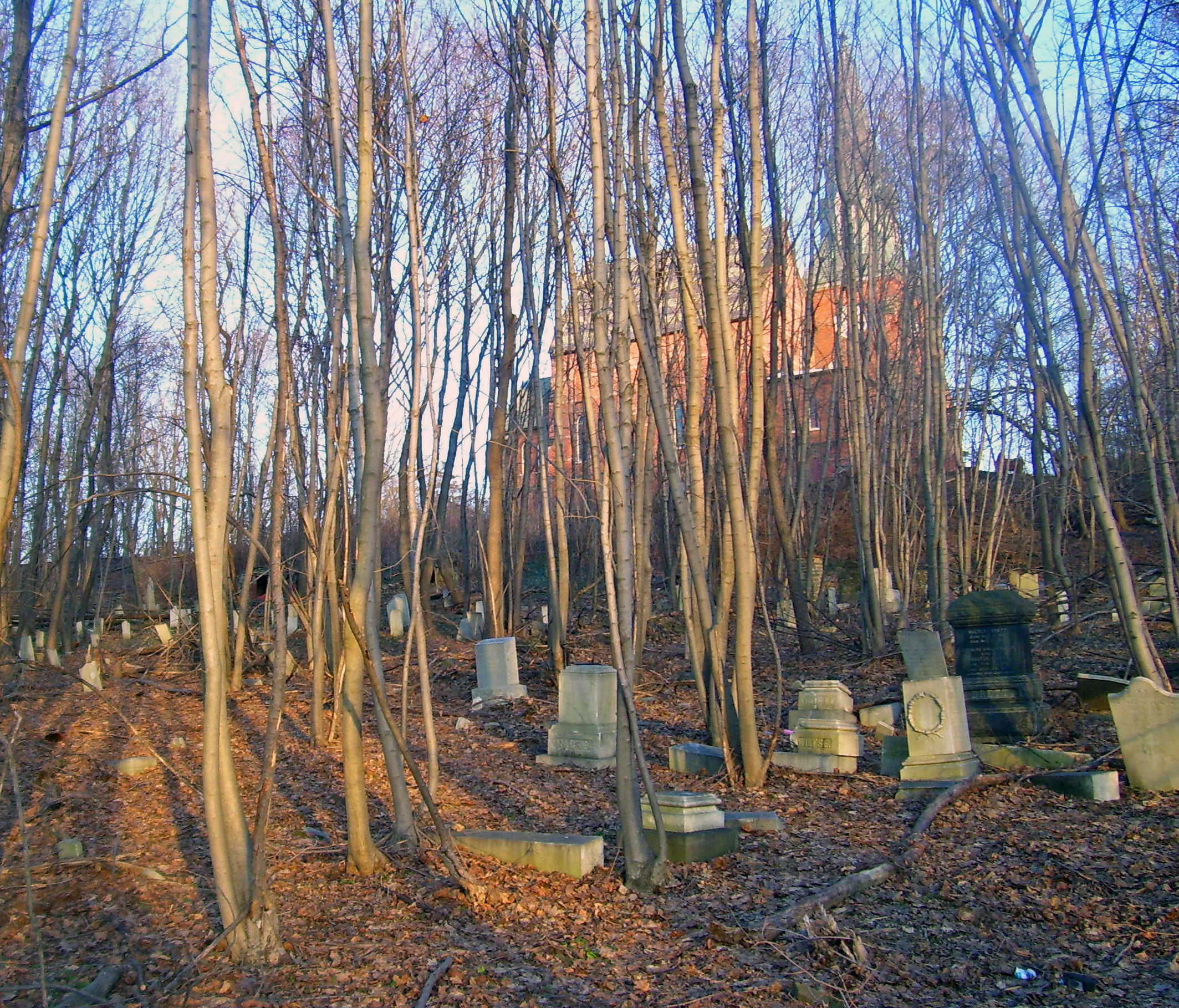
Cemetery, now overgown, in 2009

To the north of the church is the parsonage. It is a frame building two-story building with a large addition to its own north, probably built in the mid-19th century. Due to the extensive renovation and other work on it is, unlike the cemetery and church, not considered a contributing resource to the NRHP listing.

=== Aesthetics ===
A devout Episcopalian, Withers' churches for his own faith typically followed the conservative interpretation of the Gothic English rural parish church as advocated by the contemporary Ecclesiogical movement, a philosophy most visible in his nearby St. Luke's Episcopal Church, built ten years later. But when designing for other sects, he was willing to be more flexible. His design for the Reformed Church thus was his rare use for a church of the High Victorian Gothic style which characterized most of his secular buildings, such as Eustatia, a home for St. Luke's vestryman John Monell, also in Beacon. It features extensive use of polychromy on the courses of its outer walls and the slate tiling on its broad cross-gabled roof, all common features of the style. Withers' request for black brick to balance the courses could not be achieved because none had yet been locally produced.

The church is an early High Victorian Gothic work in America. It shows the influence of William Butterfield's contemporary All Saints Church in London's Fitzrovia neighborhood, and writings by John Ruskin such as The Seven Lamps of Architecture and The Stones of Venice. Influential textual sources also included G. E. Street's Brick and Marble (1855) and George Gilbert Scott's Remarks (1857), which defended the use of brick and Northern Italian Gothic features especially in church building. Since his arrival in New York, Withers had never faltered from his perusal of English periodicals and new architectural literature, some likely shared by his brother, Robert J. Withers.

== History ==
The congregation was established in 1813 in what was then a small riverside settlement known as Fishkill Landing. A small white frame church was built on the present site. The cemetery was also dedicated and received its first body at the same time. Among its earlier notable burials was William Few, Jr., a Founding Father of the United States, who was living in Fishkill at the time of his death. His body was later reinterred at St. Paul's Church in his native Augusta, Georgia.

By the late 1850s the church had grown enough that a new building was necessary, and Withers was commissioned. Local carpenter Samuel Bogardus did the framing with J.F Gerow handling the masonry and bricklaying. Shortly after it opened, the Civil War began. In 1861, the church thus entertained a visiting preacher, noted abolitionist Henry Ward Beecher, who told the congregation that liberty should be for all.

After the war, in the 1870s, the village and church had both grown enough that some additions and changes to the building were necessary. Wither's original rear wing was reduced from two stories to one to accommodate a new steeple, and in 1873 the entire structure was repaired and decorated. The original stone belfry was taken down in 1887 when it became unstable, and the organ, built by George Ryder, was installed in 1895.

In 1907 one congregant donated the lot north of the church and the house on it for use as a new parsonage. The former parsonage was sold and moved to Beacon Street in 1911.
