= Maple Lawn =

Historic house in New York, United States

- U.S. National Register of Historic Places
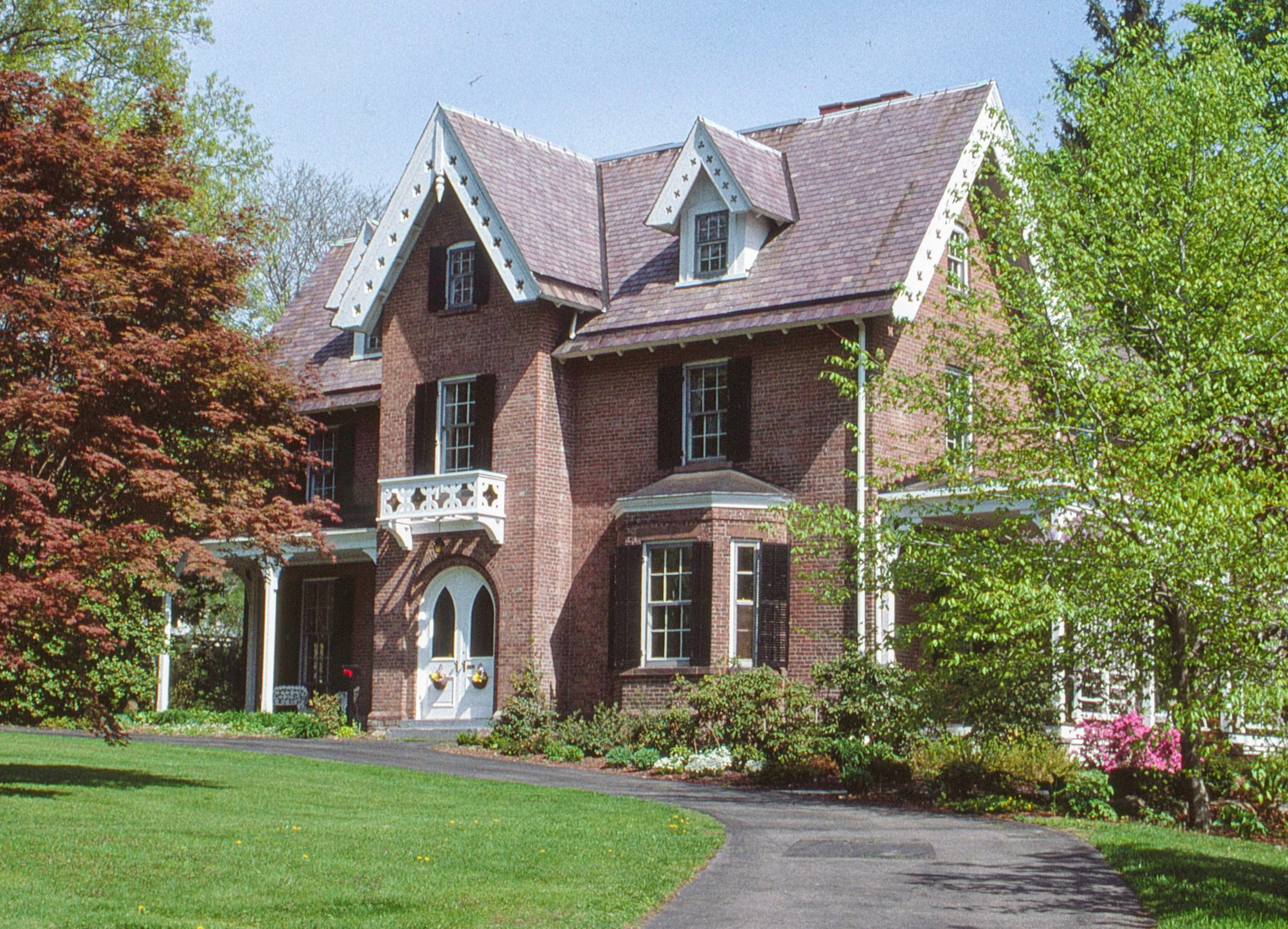
- Front (south) elevation, 1970s

- Location within New York
- Interactive map showing the location of Maple Lawn
- Location: Balmville, NY
- Nearest city: Newburgh
- Coordinates: 41°31′25″N 74°0′41″W
- Area: 1.19 acres (4,800 m^{2})
- Built: 1859–60
- Architect: Frederick Clarke Withers
- Architectural style: Gothic Revival
- NRHP reference No.: 84002879
- Added to NRHP: 1984

Maple Lawn, also known as the Walter Vail House, is a residence in Balmville, New York, United States built in the Gothic Revival architectural style's Picturesque mode. It was designed by Frederick Clarke Withers, following principles of his late mentor, Andrew Jackson Downing, and commissioned by a wealthy local family in 1859.

Since then it has undergone very few revisions, making it a well-preserved exemplar of the style, Withers' houses and Downing's aesthetics. It was added to the National Register of Historic Places in 1984.

== Description ==
The house sits on a 1-acre (4,000 m^{2}) lot on Downing Avenue in Balmville, an affluent unincorporated residential enclave in the Town of Newburgh just north of the city of Newburgh. The Hudson River is a short distance to the east down a steady slope. It is surrounded by mature trees of species including beech, black walnut and catalpa.

It is a two-and-a-half-story red brick building on a sandstone foundation with steeply-pitched gabled roof pierced by three brick chimneys. The south-facing front facade features a projecting central pavilion with white quatrefoil-pireced vergeboards at the overhanging eave. Dormer windows on either side are similarly appointed, as is the curving balustrade on an upper balcony. To the west of the doubled-doored entrance is a porch supported by chamfered posts and curved braces; to the east is a bay window.

The east side has a similar porch but with a latticework frieze and arrows pointing to the entrance. Another vergeboard decorates the rear (north) gable and a two-story kitchen wing on the north. A garage wing has also been added there. Two more of the signature vergeboards decorate the rooflines of projecting gables on the west face.

Inside, the floor plan is asymmetrical. Many of the original moldings and other wood trim remain, especially the Gothic fluted surrounds on the bay windows, which emerge from nearby pilasters. The fireplaces have their original marble mantels.

A mansard roofed privy of brick and brownstone is located behind the house. It is included in the listing as a contributing resource. A carriage house to the northwest originally built with the main house has been extensively modified and converted into a residence. It is non-contributing.

== History ==
Maple Lawn was commissioned by a resident named Walter Vail in the late 1850s. Little is known about him, but it was a time when those who had become wealthy from river trade and growing industrialization in Newburgh were building grand houses with Hudson River views for themselves either in the northeastern portion of the city or in relatively undeveloped Balmville just to the north. The house took its name from the abundant maples planted around it, which were later destroyed in a hurricane.

It has seen almost no alterations since. The growth of Balmville in the later 19th century led to the carriage house being split off onto its own lot and separately developed as a residence in 1903. In the 1950s, the corbelling on the chimneys was removed and the garage wing added. At the time of its listing on the Register, the front balcony was described as having also been removed around the same time, but it has been restored since then.

== Aesthetics ==
Downing had advocated the Picturesque as the ideal mode for his favored type of house, which integrated more seamlessly with its natural surroundings than houses built in the Greek Revival and Federal styles popular earlier in the century. After his death, Withers, who had worked for him following his emigration from his native England, was seen along with occasional collaborator Calvert Vaux as Downing's heir and successor.

Maple Lawn, designed in the "villa" form Downing thought best as a country home for a man of "means", expresses his theories with its careful placement amidst the trees and view of the river. The bay windows and porches on the house further connect the house to the landscape. Most notably, the dining room faces east so that the evening meal could be taken in the shade, while the parlor is across the house for diners to take advantage of the light afterwards, as per Downing's guidelines.

The house also demonstrative of Withers' early, pre-Civil War work, when he was more conservative than Vaux. It uses more severe massing than he would later on, uses monochromatic materials and keeps its ornamentation to the minimum of the quatrefoiled vergeboard motif. He balances regular fenestration with the asymmetry of the house plan and the steep pitch of the gables to provide the overall Picturesque effect.
