= Arcade Building (Riverside, Illinois) =

- U.S. National Register of Historic Places
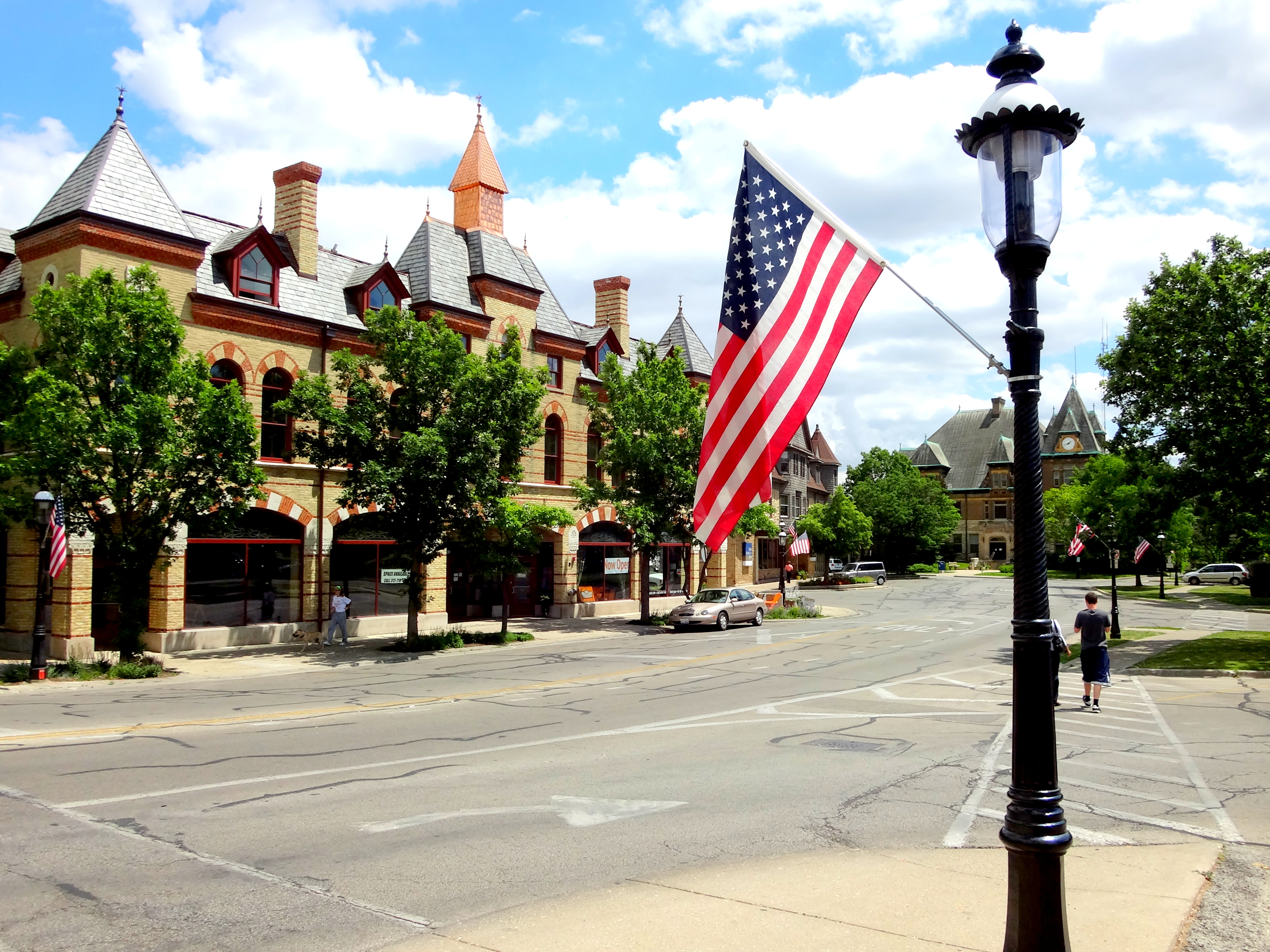
- The Arcade Building in 2012

- Location within Chicago metropolitan area Location within Illinois Location within the United States
- Location: 1 Riverside Rd., Riverside, Illinois
- Coordinates: 41°49′38″N 87°49′10″W
- Built: 1871
- Architect: Frederick C. Withers
- Architectural style: Victorian Gothic
- NRHP reference No.: 16000055
- Added to NRHP: March 8, 2016

The Arcade Building is a historic building at 1 Riverside Road in Riverside, Illinois. The building was built in 1871 as Riverside's first commercial building; its first floor housed storefronts, while its upper floors were used as residential and office space. Riverside was developed as a planned community in the late 1860s, and the Arcade Building was part of its original plan; it both provided basic services to the village's early residents and served as a focal point of its downtown. Architect Frederick C. Withers designed the Victorian Gothic building, which features brick arches over its windows, four dormers projecting from the roof, and towers atop the entrance and at each corner. By grouping the village's shops in a single planned building, the Arcade Building was one of the earliest precursors to the concept of a shopping center.

The building was added to the National Register of Historic Places on March 8, 2016.
